= List of railway stations in Abruzzo =

This is the list of the railway stations in Abruzzo owned by Rete Ferroviaria Italiana, a branch of the Italian state company Ferrovie dello Stato.

== List ==
Station	Locality	Province	Category
Acciano	Acciano	L'Aquila	Bronze
Aielli	Aielli	L'Aquila	Bronze
Alanno	Alanno	Pescara	Bronze
Alba Adriatica-Nereto-Controguerra	Alba Adriatica	Teramo	Bronze
Alfedena-Scontrone	Alfedena	L'Aquila	Bronze
Anversa-Villalago-Scanno	Anversa degli Abruzzi	L'Aquila	Bronze
Avezzano	Avezzano	L'Aquila	Silver
Balsorano	Balsorano	L'Aquila	Bronze
Beffi	Beffi	L'Aquila	Bronze
Bellante-Ripattone	Bellante	Teramo	Bronze
Bugnara	Bugnara	L'Aquila	Bronze
Bussi	Bussi sul Tirino	Pescara	Bronze
Campo di Giove	Campo di Giove	L'Aquila	Bronze
Campo di Giove-Monte Maiella	Campo di Giove	L'Aquila	Bronze
Canistro	Canistro	L'Aquila	Bronze
Capistrello	Capistrello	L'Aquila	Silver
Cappelle-Magliano	Cappelle dei Marsi	L'Aquila	Bronze
Carrito-Ortona	Ortona dei Marsi	L'Aquila	Bronze
Carsoli	Carsoli	L'Aquila	Silver
Casalbordino-Pollutri	Casalbordino	Chieti	Bronze
Castel di Sangro	Castel di Sangro	L'Aquila	Bronze
Castellalto-Canzano	Castellalto	Teramo	Bronze
Celano-Ovindoli	Celano	L'Aquila	Bronze
Cerchio	Cerchio	L'Aquila	Bronze
Chieti-Madonna delle Piane	Chieti	Chieti	Bronze
Chieti	Chieti	Chieti	Silver
Civita d'Antino-Morino	Civita d'Antino	L'Aquila	Bronze
Civitella Roveto	Civitella Roveto	L'Aquila	Silver
Cocullo	Cocullo	L'Aquila	Bronze
Collarmele	Collarmele	L'Aquila	Bronze
Colli di Monte Bove	Carsoli	L'Aquila	Bronze
Cupone	Capistrello	L'Aquila	Bronze
Fagnano-Campana	Fagnano Alto	L'Aquila	Bronze
Fontecchio	Fontecchio	L'Aquila	Bronze
Fossacesia-Torino di Sangro	Fossacesia	Chieti	Bronze
Francavilla al Mare	Francavilla al Mare	Chieti	Bronze
Giulianova	Giulianova	Teramo	Silver
Goriano Sicoli	Goriano Sicoli	L'Aquila	Bronze
L'Aquila	L'Aquila	L'Aquila	Silver
Manoppello	Manoppello	Pescara	Bronze
Molina-Castelvecchio Subequo	Molina Aterno	L'Aquila	Bronze
Montesilvano	Montesilvano	Pescara	Silver
Morrea-Castronovo-Rendinara	Morrea	L'Aquila	Bronze
Mosciano Sant'Angelo	Mosciano Sant'Angelo	Teramo	Bronze
Notaresco	Teramo	Teramo	Bronze
Oricola-Pereto	Oricola	L'Aquila	Bronze
Ortona	Ortona	Chieti	Bronze
Paganica	Paganica	L'Aquila	Bronze
Palena	Palena	Chieti	Bronze
Pescara (or Pescara Centrale)	Pescara	Pescara	Gold
Pescara Porta Nuova	Pescara	Pescara	Silver
Pescara San Marco	Pescara	Pescara	Bronze
Pescara Tribunale	Pescara	Pescara	Bronze
Pescina	Pescina	L'Aquila	Bronze
Pescocanale	Pescocanale	L'Aquila	Bronze
Piano d'Orta-Bolognano	Bolognano	Pescara	Bronze
Pineto-Atri	Pineto	Teramo	Silver
Popoli-Vittorito	Popoli	Pescara	Bronze
Porto di Vasto	Porto di Vasto	Chieti	Bronze
Pratola Peligna	Pratola Peligna	L'Aquila	Bronze
Pratola Peligna Superiore	Pratola Peligna	L'Aquila	Bronze
Prezza	Prezza	L'Aquila	Bronze
Raiano	Raiano	L'Aquila	Bronze
Ridotti-Collepiano	Ridotti	L'Aquila	Bronze
Rivisondoli-Pescocostanzo	Rivisondoli	L'Aquila	Bronze
Roccaraso	Roccaraso	L'Aquila	Bronze
Roccavivi	San Vincenzo Valle Roveto	L'Aquila	Bronze
Roseto degli Abruzzi	Roseto degli Abruzzi	Teramo	Silver
San Demetrio De' Vestini	San Demetrio ne' Vestini	L'Aquila	Bronze
San Vincenzo Valle Roveto	San Vincenzo Valle Roveto	L'Aquila	Bronze
San Vito-Lanciano	San Vito Chietino	Chieti	Bronze
Sante Marie	Sante Marie	L'Aquila	Bronze
Sassa-Tornimparte	Sassa	L'Aquila	Bronze
Scafa-San Valentino-Caramanico Terme	Scafa	Pescara	Silver
Scerne di Pineto	Scerne	Teramo	Bronze
Scurcola Marsicana	Scurcola Marsicana	L'Aquila	Bronze
Sella di Corno	Sella di Corno	L'Aquila	Bronze
Silvi	Silvi	Teramo	Silver
Sulmona	Sulmona	L'Aquila	Silver
Tagliacozzo	Tagliacozzo	L'Aquila	Silver
Teramo	Teramo	Teramo	Silver
Tione degli Abruzzi	Tione degli Abruzzi	L'Aquila	Bronze
Tocco-Castiglione	Tocco da Casauria	Pescara	Bronze
Tollo-Canosa Sannita	Tollo	Chieti	Bronze
Torre dei Passeri	Torre dei Passeri	Pescara	Silver
Tortoreto Lido	Tortoreto	Teramo	Bronze
Vasto-San Salvo	Vasto	Chieti	Silver
Villa San Sebastiano	Villa San Sebastiano	L'Aquila	Bronze

== See also ==
- Railway stations in Italy
- Ferrovie dello Stato
- Rail transport in Italy
- High-speed rail in Italy
- Transport in Italy
