= Cocullo =

Comune in Abruzzo, Italy

- Comune
- Comune di Cocullo
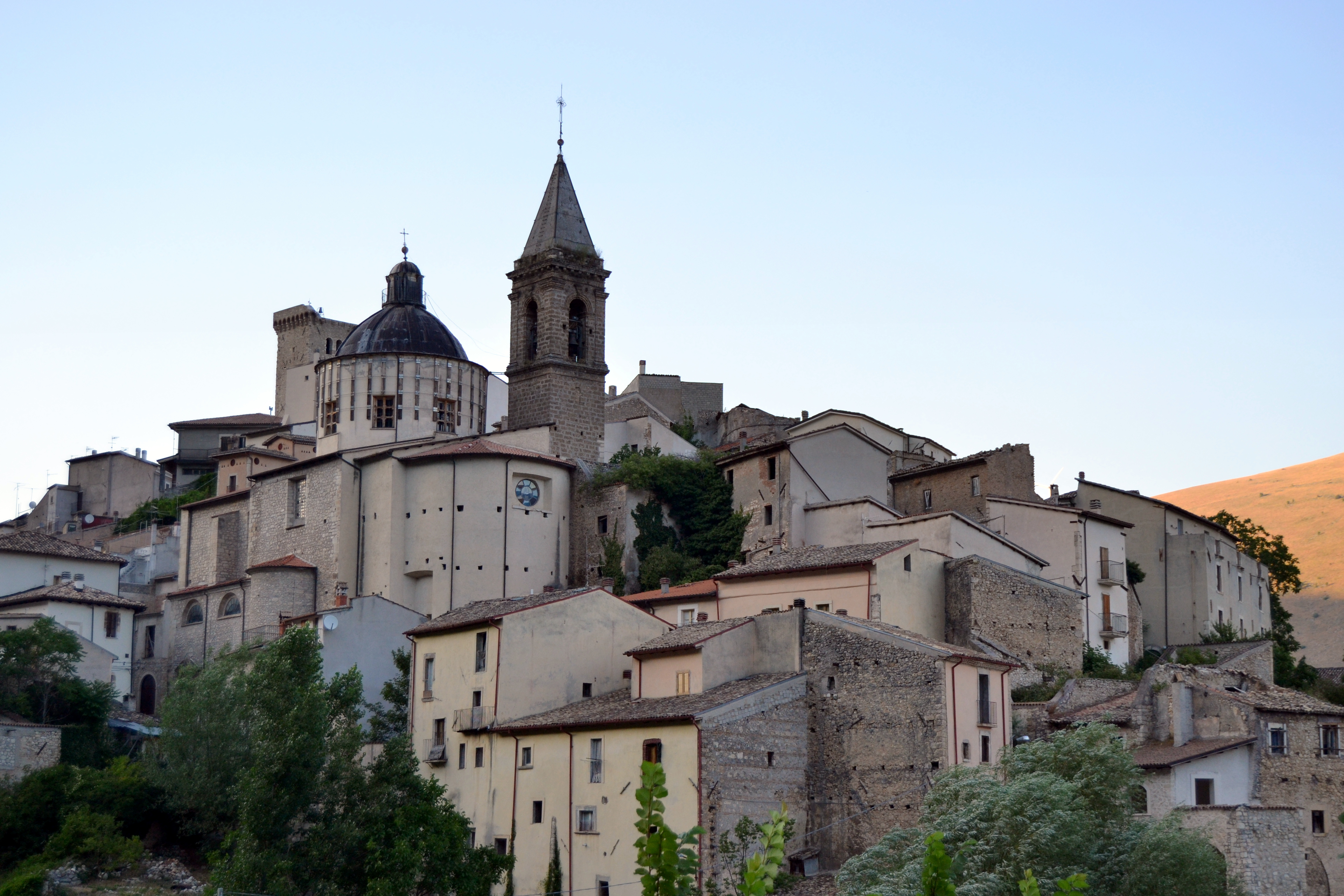

- Map of Cocullo within the Province of L'Aquila

- Location within Italy Location within Abruzzo
- Coordinates: 42°2′2″N 13°46′33″E
- Country: Italy
- Region: Abruzzo
- Province: L'Aquila (AQ)
- Frazioni: Casale

Government
  - Mayor: Sandro Chiocchio (Civic list Insieme per il progresso)

Area
  - Total: 31 km^{2} (12 sq mi)
- Elevation: 897 m (2,943 ft)

Population (2013)
  - Total: 246
  - Density: 7.9/km^{2} (21/sq mi)
- Demonym: Cocullesi
- Time zone: UTC+1 (CET)
  - Summer (DST): UTC+2 (CEST)
- Postal code: 67030
- Dialing code: 0864
- ISTAT code: 066037
- Patron saint: San Domenico di Sora
- Saint day: First Thursday in May
- Website: Official website

Cocullo is a comune and town in the Province of L'Aquila, located in the Abruzzo region of Italy. As of 2013 its population was 246.

== Geography ==
The village is situated in the Peligna Valley, between the towns of Avezzano and Sulmona. It is linked with them by the A25 motorway and the Rome-Pescara railway line.

It is a single civil parish (frazione), named Casale and borders with the municipalities of Anversa degli Abruzzi, Bugnara, Castel di Ieri, Castelvecchio Subequo, Goriano Sicoli, Ortona dei Marsi and Prezza.

== History ==
The origins of Cocullo are closely related to the Ancient Roman town of Koukoulon, situated between Cocullo village and Casale.

== Snake Festival (Feast of San Domenico) ==
Cocullo is known for its singular patron saint's holiday, named Festa dei Serpari, in which the patron saint's statue (Domenico di Sora) is transported in a procession covered with many snakes (mainly four-lined, aesculapian, grass and green whip snakes). The reptiles are draped onto the statue before the procession by local serpari, villagers trained and authorized to capture wild snakes, who then release them in the same location where they have been found after the holiday. The festival, set every first of May since 2012 (in the past it took place every first Thursday in May), is a receptive event for thousands of Italian and foreign visitors. In 2009 it was cancelled due to some structural damages occurred into the village after the L'Aquila earthquake. This tradition, present also in coat of arms symbolism, substituted the ancient Roman mythologic ritual of Angitia, a snake goddess worshipped by the Marsi.

== Gallery ==
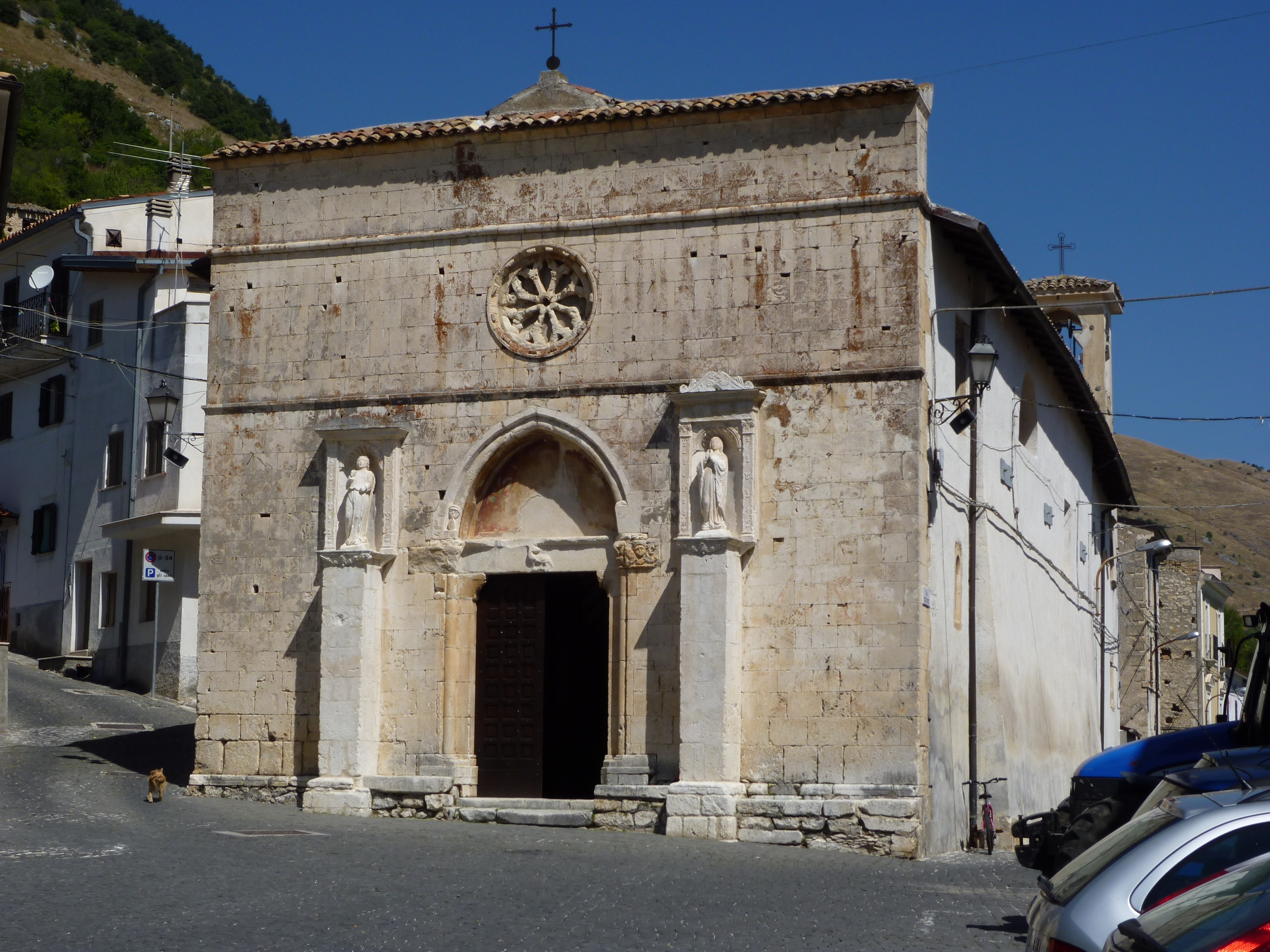
The main church of Our Lady of Graces (Santa Maria delle Grazie) in central Cocullo
