= Chieti railway station =

Railway station in Chieti, Italy

Chieti
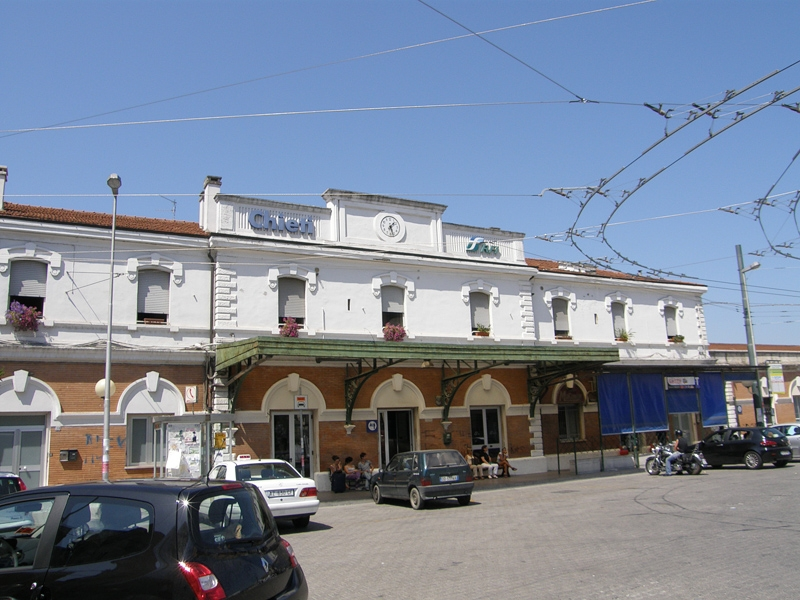
- View of the passenger building.

General information
- Location: Piazzale Guglielmo Marconi; 66100 Chieti CH; Chieti, Chieti, Abruzzo; Italy
- Coordinates: 42°21′25″N 14°08′18″E
- Operator: Rete Ferroviaria Italiana; Centostazioni
- Line: Roma–Sulmona–Pescara
- Distance: 14.469 km (8.991 mi) from Pescara
- Train operators: Trenitalia
- Connections: Urban, Suburban buses and trolleybus service

Other information
- Classification: Silver

History
- Opened: 1 March 1873; 153 years ago
Location
- Location within Abruzzo Location within Italy

Chieti railway station (Italian: Stazione di Chieti) serves the city and comune of Chieti, in the region of Abruzzo, southern Italy. Opened in 1873, it forms part of the Rome–Sulmona–Pescara railway.

The station is currently managed by Rete Ferroviaria Italiana (RFI). However, the commercial area of the passenger building is managed by Centostazioni. Train services to and from the station are operated by Trenitalia. Each of these companies is a subsidiary of Ferrovie dello Stato Italiane (FS), Italy's state-owned rail company.

== Location ==
Chieti railway station is situated in Piazza Guglielmo Marconi in the Chieti Scalo district, about 4–5 kilometres (2–3 mi) west of the city centre.

== History ==
The station was opened on 1 March 1873, upon the inauguration of the Pescara–Popoli section of the Rome–Sulmona–Pescara railway.

== Features ==
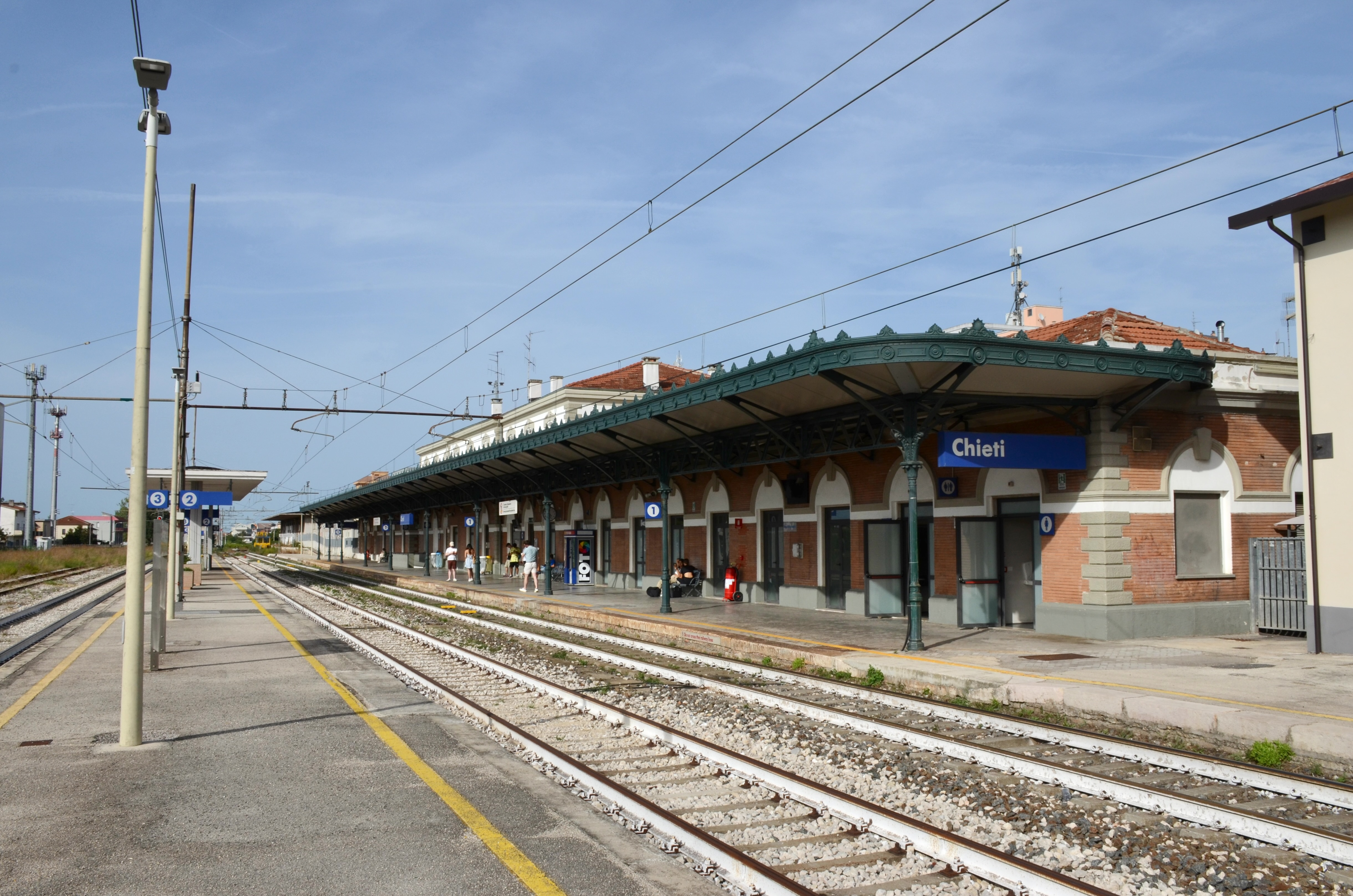
Track side of station, showing the platforms

The passenger building consists of three sections, each with two levels. The entire passenger building is made of brick, and the upper level is painted white.

At ground floor level, all three sections have three arches. Upstairs, there are three single-light windows accompanied by a cornice. The walls of the central section extend somewhat higher than those of the two lateral sections.

Adjacent to the passenger building is a single-storey brick building, built at a later date than the main building. It houses the station bar.

The station yard consists of three passenger tracks: the first is the main track, and the other two are used for overtaking, or for trains terminating in Chieti. Each of these tracks has a platform, and the platforms are connected by an underpass. There are other tracks used for the storage of goods trains.

In 2010, thanks to a joint investment of RFI and Centostazioni amounting to €400,000, the station underwent a restructuring process involving the following: cleaning and finishing of the front of the passenger building, replacement of fixtures, compliance of the structures with legal standards, removal of architectural barriers and the resurfacing of the roof.

== Train services ==
The station is served by the following service(s):

- Regional services (Treno regionale) Pescara- Chieti - Sulmona - Avezzano - Tivoli - Rome
- Regional services (Treno regionale) Teramo - Giulianova - Pescara - Chieti - Sulmona - Avezzano

== Interchange ==
Left the passenger building are taxis and a parking lot.

As regards public transport, in the square in front of the passenger building is some bus stops for trolleybuses to the city centre and other suburban and national buses.

== See also ==
- History of rail transport in Italy
- List of railway stations in Abruzzo
- Rail transport in Italy
- Railway stations in Italy
