= Sicoli =

Sicoli may refer to:

- Piero Sicoli, Italian astronomer
- Goriano Sicoli, town in Abruzzo, Italy
