= Festival of the snake-catchers =

Annual festival held in Cocullo, Italy

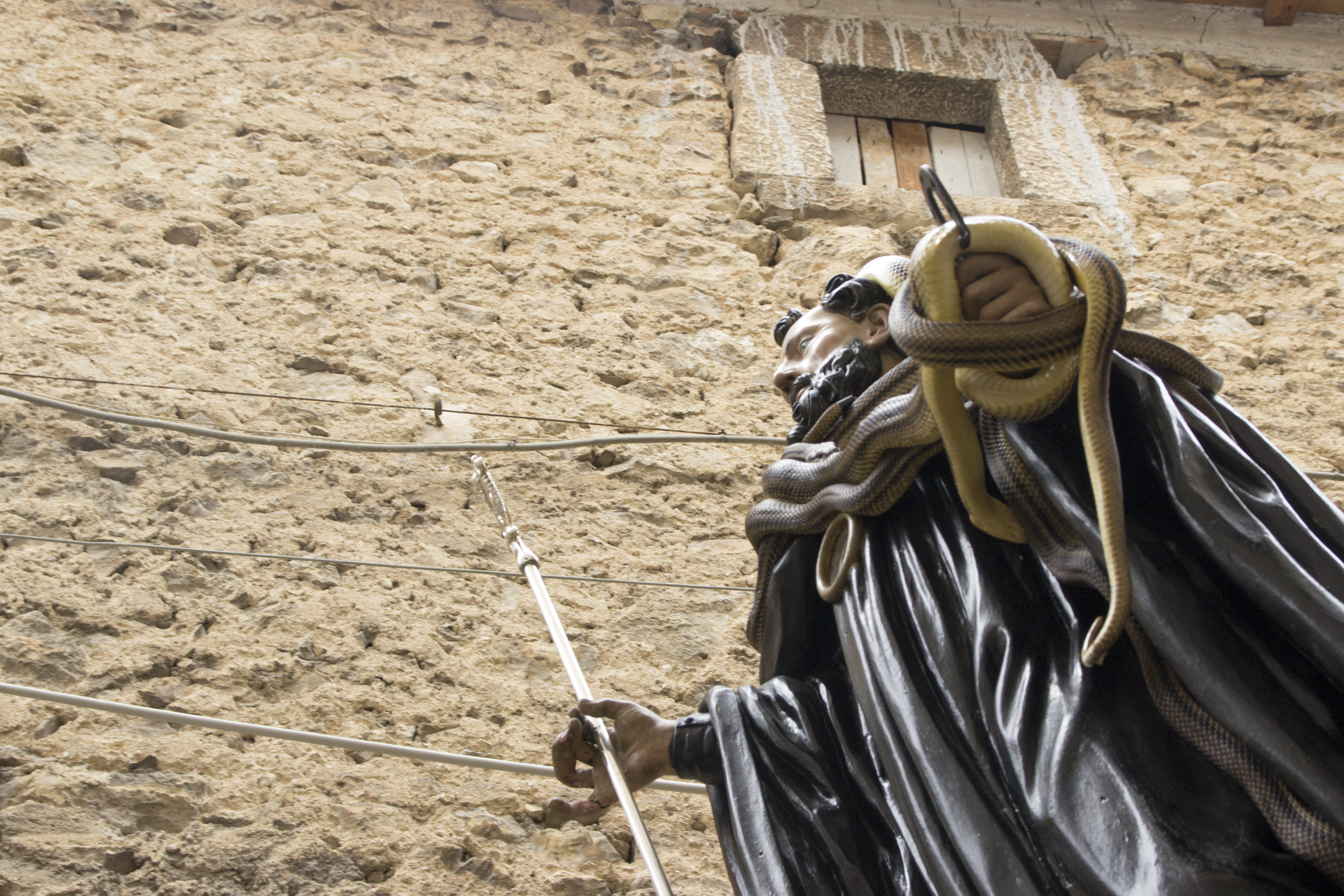
- Statue of St Domenico being carried in procession at Cocullo
- Status: Active
- Genre: Religious
- Frequency: Annually
- Location: Cocullo
- Country: Italy

The Festival of the snake catchers (or snake-charmers) (Festa dei Serpari di Cocullo) is an annual festival held on May 1 in Cocullo, Italy in honour of St. Dominic di Sora, patron saint protecting against snakebite and toothache. Its origins date back to paganism and have roots in an ancient celebration in honour of the Roman goddess Angitia. The festival involves a procession carrying the statue of St. Dominic, draped with live snakes, through the streets of the village.

== Overview ==
After Mass, the statue of St. Dominic di Sora is brought out and paraded through the streets, completely covered in snakes, followed by the Serpari (a hereditary brotherhood of local snake-charmers) who are also draped with snakes.

This festival has pre-Christian roots and is related to a much older rite, that of the snake deity, Angitia. In pagan times, the snake-charmers were the priests at the sanctuary of Angitia and the snakes were associated with healing. Cocullo was the territory of the Marsi, known for their magic arts and power over serpents.

The festival was nominated as a cultural ceremony to be protected by UNESCO.
