= Castel di Ieri =

- Comune
- Comune di Castel di Ieri
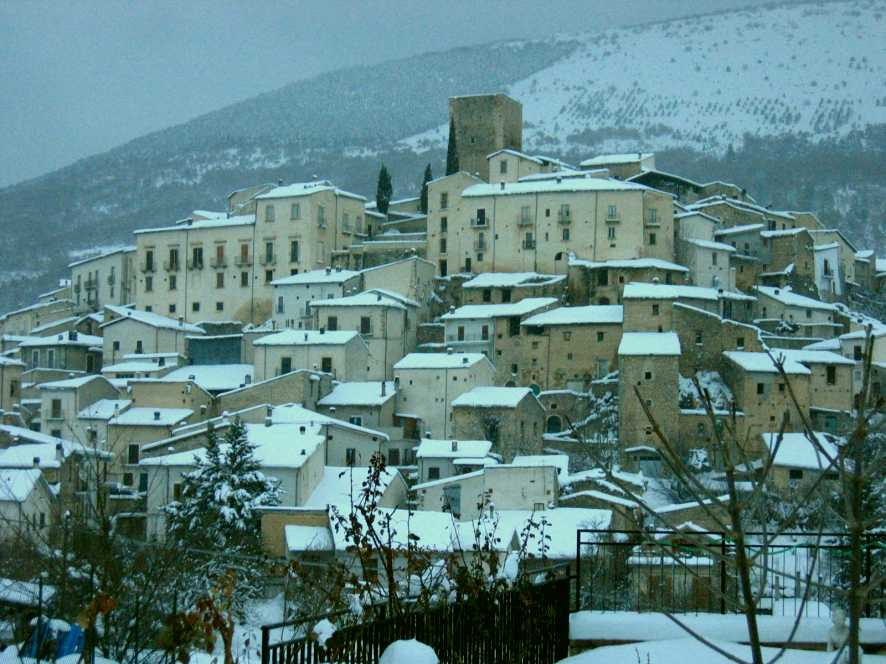

- Location within Italy Location within Abruzzo
- Coordinates: 42°6′58″N 13°44′37″E
- Country: Italy
- Region: Abruzzo
- Province: L'Aquila (AQ)
- Frazioni: Castelvecchio Subequo, Cocullo, Goriano Sicoli, Raiano

Area
  - Total: 18.75 km^{2} (7.24 sq mi)
- Elevation: 519 m (1,703 ft)

Population (31 December 2013)
  - Total: 326
  - Density: 17.4/km^{2} (45.0/sq mi)
- Demonym: Casteldieresi
- Time zone: UTC+1 (CET)
  - Summer (DST): UTC+2 (CEST)
- Postal code: 67020
- Dialing code: 0864
- ISTAT code: 066027
- Patron saint: San Donato
- Saint day: 3 September

Castel di Ieri is a comune and town in the Province of L'Aquila in the Abruzzo region of Italy.
