= Prezza =

Prezza may refer to:

- Prezza, Abruzzo, a town in the province of L'Aquila, Italy
- John Prescott (1938–2024), British politician, nicknamed Prezza
