= Avezzano railway station =

Railway station in Italy

Avezzano
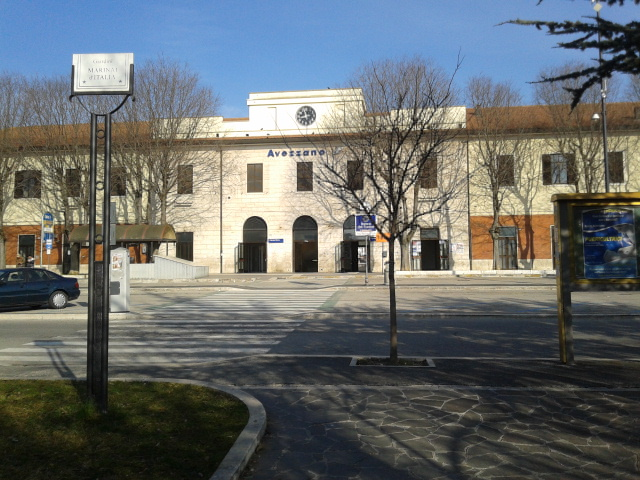
- Avezzano railway station

General information
- Location: Piazza Matteotti, Avezzano, Province of L'Aquila, Abruzzo; Italy
- Coordinates: 42°02′22″N 13°25′34″E
- Owner: Rete Ferroviaria Italiana
- Operator: Trenitalia
- Lines: Rome–Sulmona–Pescara railway Avezzano-Roccasecca railway
- Platforms: 5

Other information
- Classification: Silver

History
- Opened: 28 July 1888; 138 years ago
Location
- Location within Italy

Avezzano is a railway station in Avezzano, Italy. It opened in 1888 and is located on the Rome–Sulmona–Pescara railway and Avezzano-Roccasecca railway. The train services are operated by Trenitalia.

Exposed as a monument at the station is the Monte Velino (number 8) locomotive. This was one of the ten used by Alessandro Torlonia to transport beet from Fucino to the sugarbeet factory. The engine was placed on a specially-made track in front of Villa Torlonia on the occasion of the celebrations related to the centenary of the 1915 earthquake. This locomotive is considered one of the symbols of post-earthquake Avezzano.

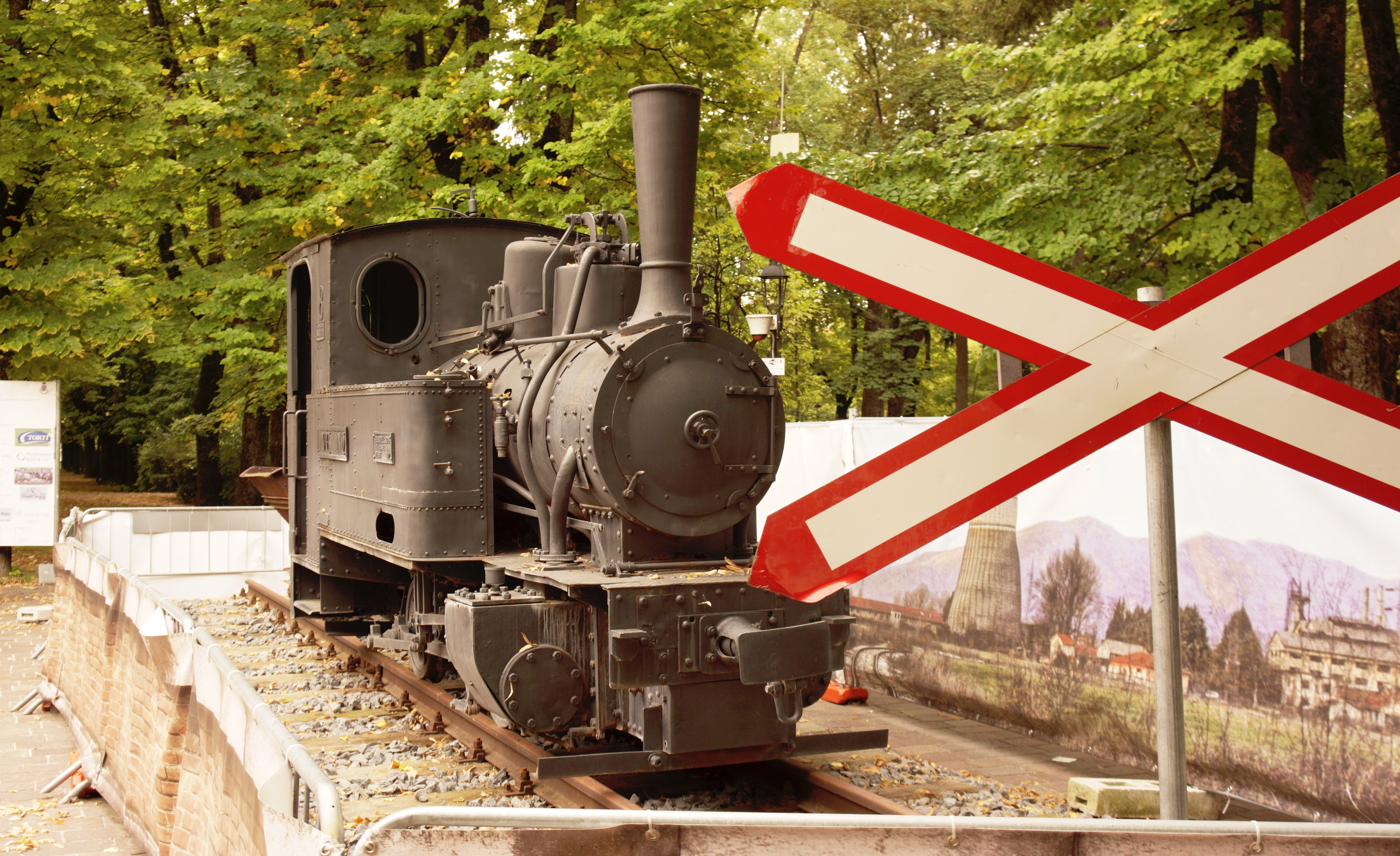
The locomotive Mone Velino on display

== History ==
The original buildings, inside and outside the station, were destroyed by the 1915 earthquake. The new building was restored after World War II.

== Train services ==
The station is served by the following service(s):

- Regional services (Treno regionale) Pescara - Chieti - Sulmona - Avezzano - Tivoli - Rome
- Regional services (Treno regionale) Teramo - Giulianova - Pescara - Chieti - Sulmona - Avezzano
- Regional services (Treno regionale) Avezzano - Sora - Roccasecca - Cassino
