= Chieti–Madonna delle Piane railway station =

Railway station in Chieti, Italy

Chieti Madonna delle Piane
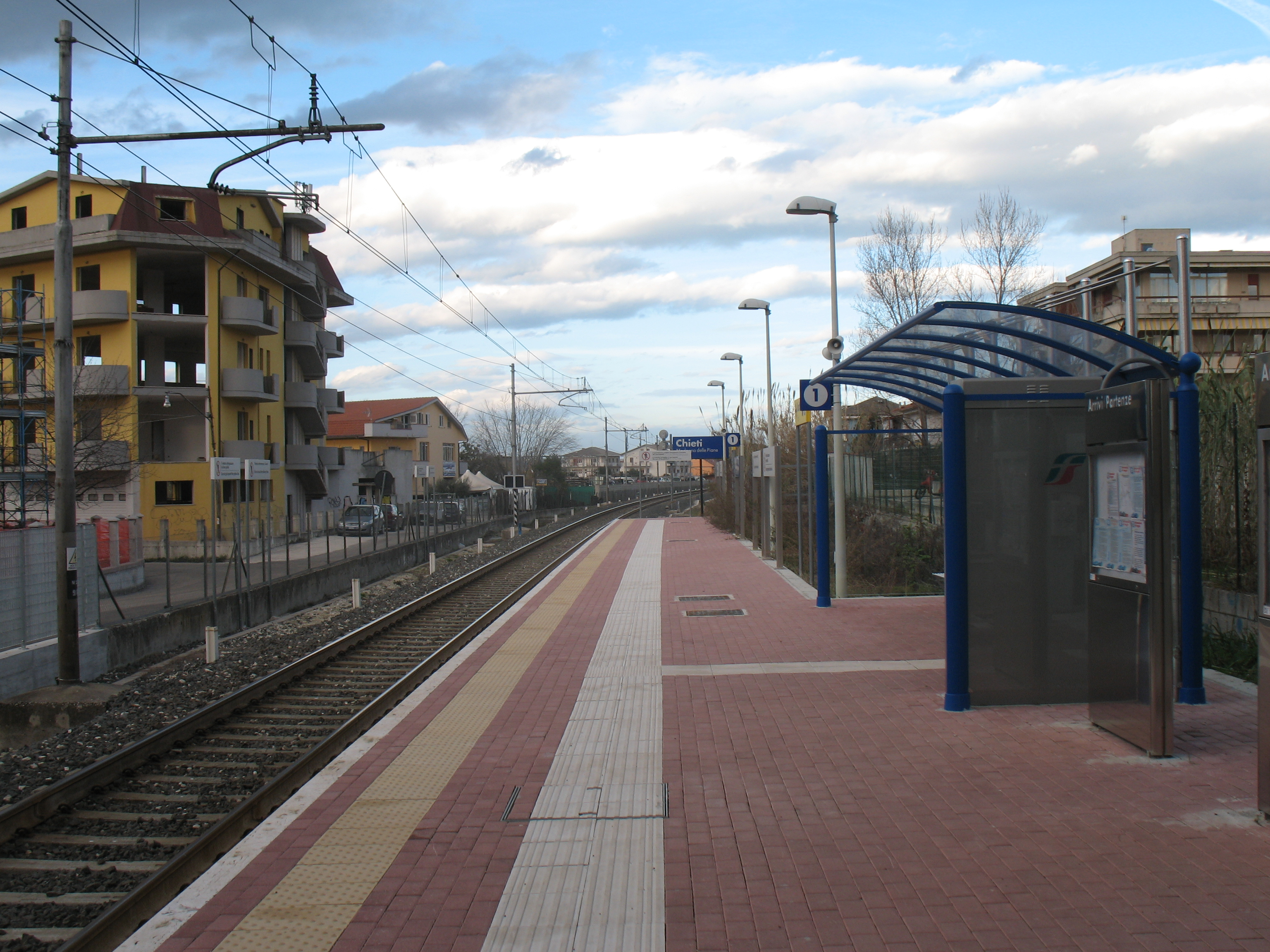
- Chieti–Madonna delle Piane

General information
- Location: Chieti Scalo, Chieti, Abruzzo; Italy
- Coordinates: 42°22′22.4″N 14°8′34.79″E
- Owner: Rete Ferroviaria Italiana
- Operator: Trenitalia
- Line: Rome–Sulmona–Pescara railway
- Platforms: 1

Other information
- Classification: Bronze

History
- Opened: 30 March 2016; 10 years ago
Location
- Location within Italy

Chieti–Madonna delle Piane is a railway station in Chieti, Italy. The station opened on 30 March 2016 and is located on the Rome–Sulmona–Pescara railway. The train services are operated by Trenitalia.

== Train services ==
The station is served by the following service(s):

- Regional services (Treno regionale) Pescara- Chieti - Sulmona - Avezzano - Tivoli - Rome
- Regional services (Treno regionale) Teramo - Giulianova - Pescara - Chieti - Sulmona - Avezzano
