= Luco dei Marsi =

- Comune
- Comune di Luco dei Marsi
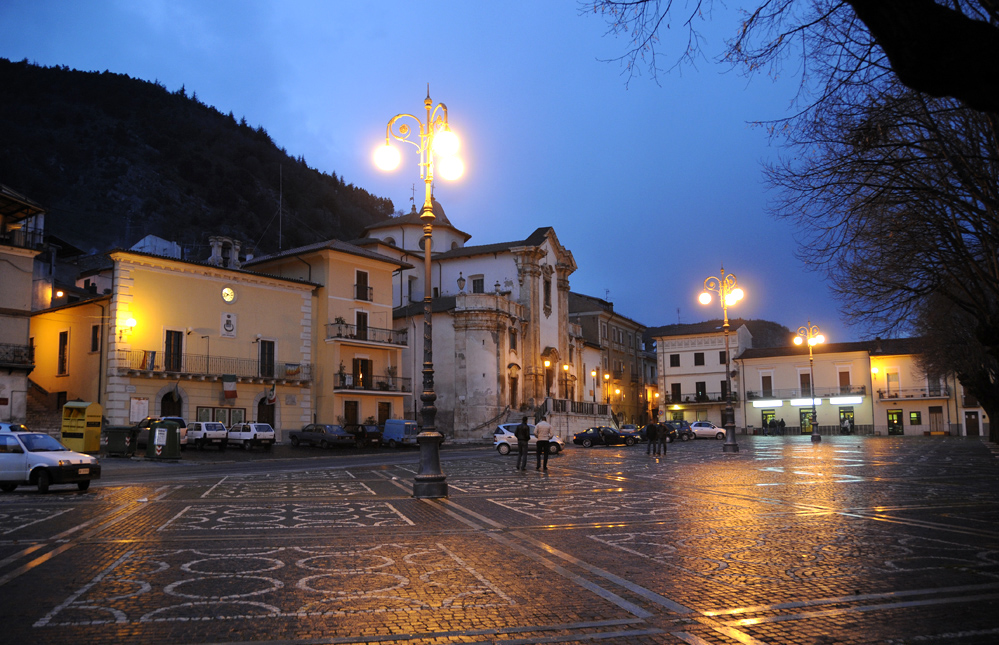

- Location within Italy Location within Abruzzo
- Coordinates: 41°58′N 13°28′E
- Country: Italy
- Region: Abruzzo
- Province: L'Aquila (AQ)
- Frazioni: Petogna

Government
  - Mayor: Marivera De Rosa (Luco nel cuore per il bene comune)

Area
  - Total: 44.87 km^{2} (17.32 sq mi)
- Elevation: 680 m (2,230 ft)

Population (30 September 2017)
  - Total: 6,047
  - Density: 134.8/km^{2} (349.0/sq mi)
- Demonym: Luchesi
- Time zone: UTC+1 (CET)
  - Summer (DST): UTC+2 (CEST)
- Postal code: 67056
- Dialing code: 0863
- Patron saint: Madonna dell'Ospedale
- Saint day: Last Sunday in August
- Website: Official website

Luco dei Marsi is a comune and town in the province of L'Aquila in the Abruzzo region of central-eastern Italy. It is part of the Marsica.

The town was probably founded by the Roman Emperor Claudius to house workers in the drying of the Lacus Fucinus (Lake Fucino). The name derives from a nearby wood, Lucus Angitiae, "Sacred Grove of Angitia", referring to a divine sorceress of the Marsi Italic tribe.

During the Middle Ages it was a fief of the D'Aquino and then of the Colonna family.
