= Roccavivi =

Coordinates: 41°48′43″N 13°32′12″E

- Frazione
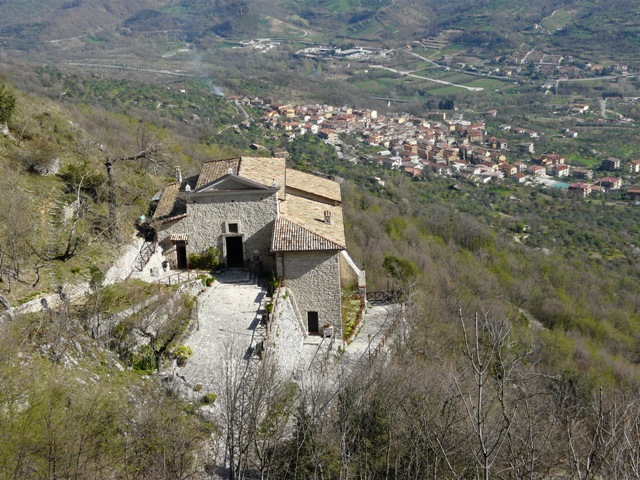
- Interactive map of Roccavivi
- Country: Italy
- Region: Abruzzo
- Province: L'Aquila
- Commune: San Vincenzo Valle Roveto

Population (2024)
  - Total: 1,046
- Time zone: UTC+1 (CET)
  - Summer (DST): UTC+2 (CEST)

Roccavivi is a frazione of San Vincenzo Valle Roveto, in the Province of L'Aquila in the Abruzzo, region of Italy.
