= Lucus Angitiae =

Archaeological site in Abruzzo, Italy

Coordinates: 41.9708°N 13.4607°E

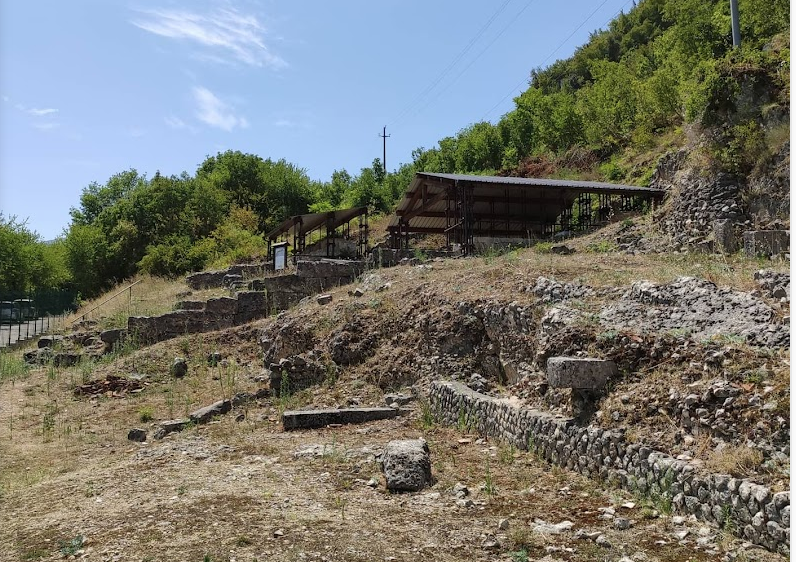

- Location within Abruzzo
- Periods: Roman Republic
- Location: Luco dei Marsi

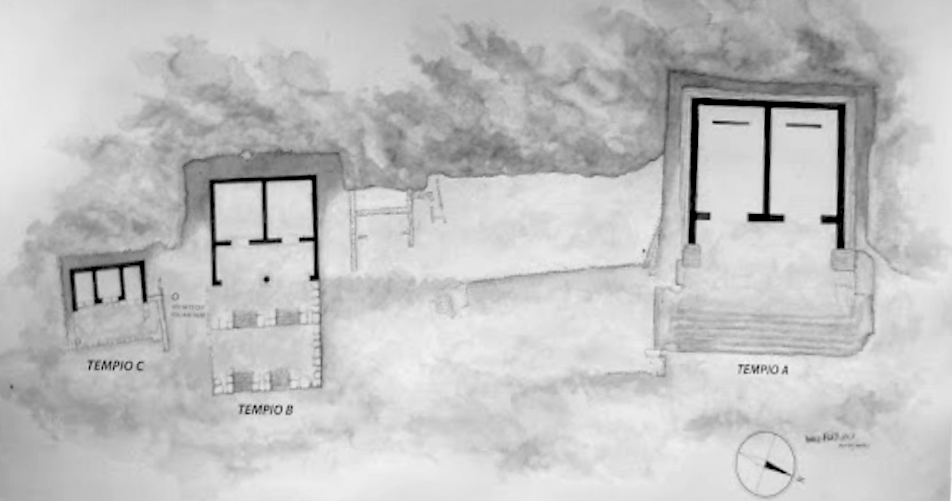
Plan of Lucus Angitiae

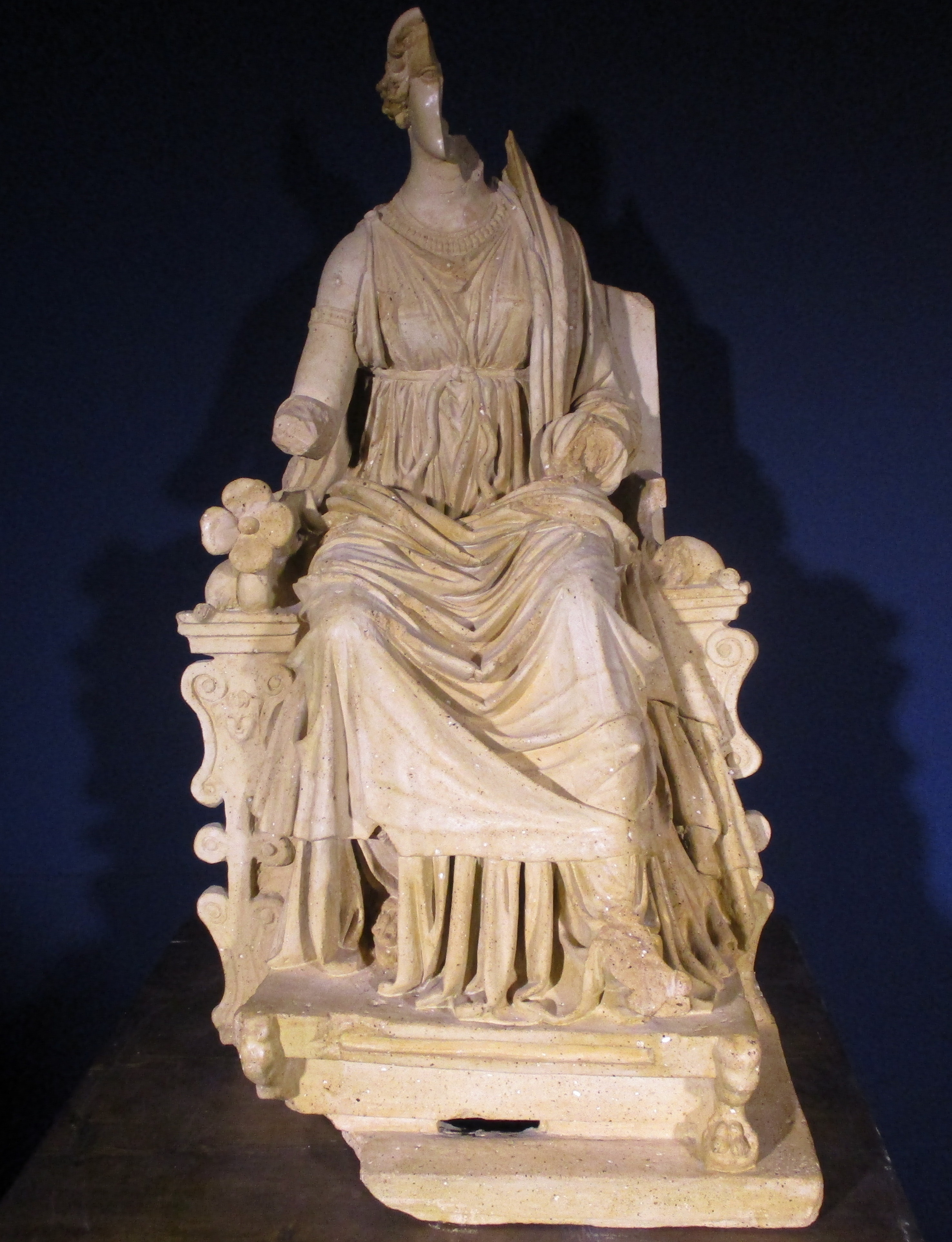
Terracotta statue of Angitia

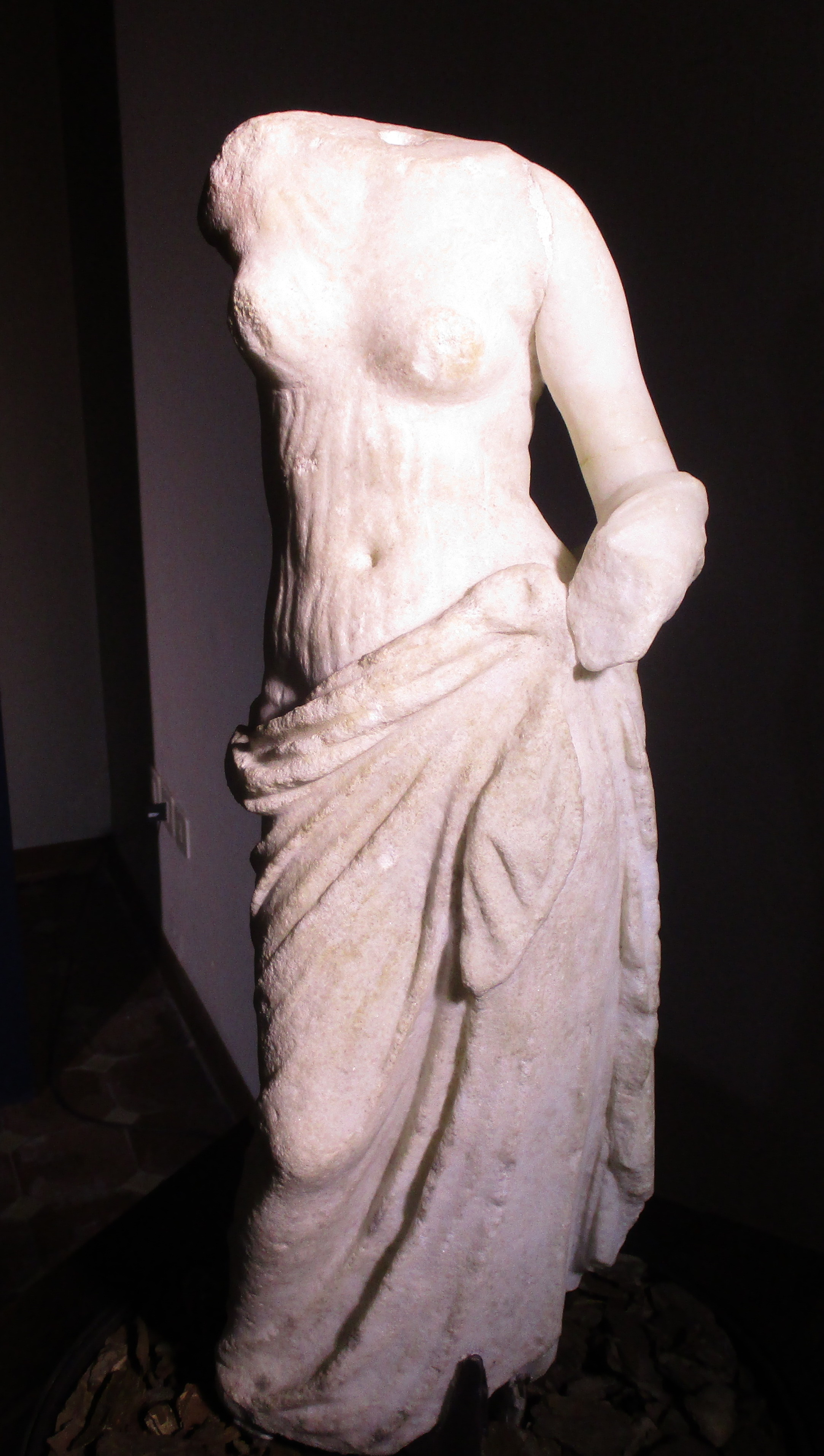
statue of Venus

Lucus Angitiae was an Italic and Roman town and sanctuary with temple of the goddess Angitia, the ruins of which are located in the comune of Luco dei Marsi in the Abruzzo region of Italy.

The original name of the site was linked to the word lux (light), from which lucus, or the clearing in the woods, is derived as a traditional name for an ancient sanctuary. Angitia was venerated by the Marsi who lived on the shores of Lake Fucino.

== History ==
According to legend, the inhabitants were skilled preparers of antidotes against snake poisons and connoisseurs of the herbs of the surrounding mountains, starting with Umbro who was killed by Aeneas in the war between the Italians and the Trojans, as narrated in the Aeneid.

Archaeology has shown that the site can be traced to the Bronze Age. During the Iron Age the fortified area developed over 14 hectares, walled with polygonal masonry and with two gates. The acropolis on the overhanging Mount Penna was incorporated in the underlying city-sanctuary during the Samnite wars through city walls which covered an area of about 30 hectares and which were equipped with five gates.

The sanctuary dates to the 3rd century BC and is visible today, together with the terracing wall of the sanctuary and the traces of the large Iron Age wall enclosure, the ruins of the three access doors to the temples, the traces of the forum and the artisan quarter. The sanctuary-city is dominated by the acropolis of Monte Penna.

== Excavations ==
The site came to light by chance through public works.

Excavations conducted since the early seventies and from 1998 brought to light the two temples, the Italic one consisting of two cellas and the Roman era one which has three rooms. Doric columns, furnaces and burials have also been discovered. In 2003 research revealed other important finds, in particular in the area called the Sacristy the three fine statues came to light: one, which according to some scholars could be connected to the figure of the goddess Angitia, is in terracotta and from the 3rd century BC; the other two marble statues (one of Venus) are from the 2nd century BC and attributed to Rhodian workshops.

Other statues, bas-relief sculptures, small bronzes etc. are exhibited in the Marsica museum of sacred art and kept in the Paludi museum in Celano.

Since 2014 the site has been open to visitors.
