= Goriano Sicoli =

- Comune
- Comune di Goriano Sicoli
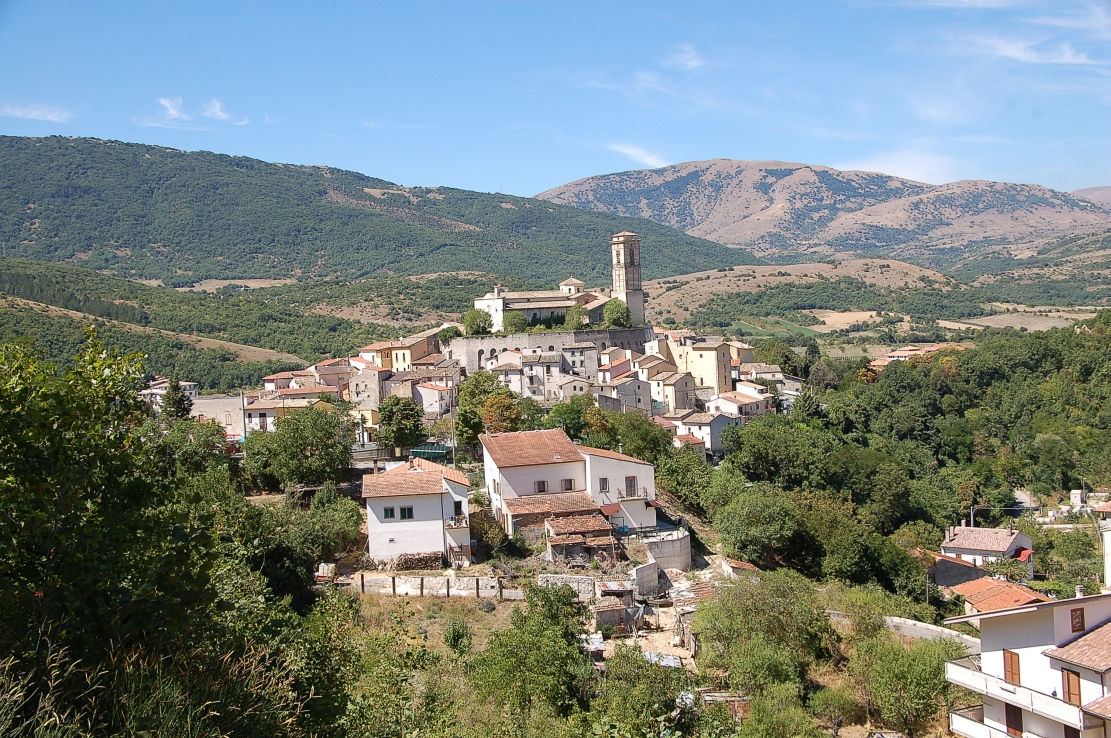

- Location within Italy Location within Abruzzo
- Coordinates: 42°4′54″N 13°46′33″E
- Country: Italy
- Region: Abruzzo
- Province: L'Aquila (AQ)
- Frazioni: Castel di Ieri, Cocullo, Prezza, Raiano

Government
  - Mayor: Rodolfo Marganelli

Area
  - Total: 21.75 km^{2} (8.40 sq mi)
- Elevation: 720 m (2,360 ft)

Population (31 December 2013)
  - Total: 571
  - Density: 26.3/km^{2} (68.0/sq mi)
- Demonym: Gorianesi
- Time zone: UTC+1 (CET)
  - Summer (DST): UTC+2 (CEST)
- Postal code: 67030
- Dialing code: 0864
- ISTAT code: 066047
- Patron saint: Santa Gemma Vergine
- Saint day: 11, 12 and 13 May

Goriano Sicoli is a comune and town in the Province of L'Aquila in the Abruzzo region of Italy.

Goriano is a medieval town of about 600 people (2013). The town, which sits on top of a mountain in southeast Abruzzo (about an hour and a half east of Rome and near the Adriatic coast town of Pescara), was made somewhat famous by M. C. Escher in his print of the town which hangs in the National Gallery of Art in Washington.

Italian historical documents reference Goriano beginning around 816, but local residents claim the town is early Roman and existed in some form over 2000 years ago.

Goriano Sicoli (literally, the Goriano of Sicily) lies at the south east end of the Comunità Montana Sirentina region of Abruzzo. This group of mountain towns includes ski resorts, castles, a Roman bridge, water wheels and rural churches. The region runs along both sides of the river Aterno, which flows from the regional capital L'Aquila to the Adriatic Sea.

== Climate ==
Climate data for Goriano Sicoli, elevation 785 m (2,575 ft), (1951–2000)
| Month | Jan | Feb | Mar | Apr | May | Jun | Jul | Aug | Sep | Oct | Nov | Dec | Year |
|---|---|---|---|---|---|---|---|---|---|---|---|---|---|
| Record high °C (°F) | 23.8 (74.8) | 21.8 (71.2) | 26.9 (80.4) | 32.4 (90.3) | 33.1 (91.6) | 37.5 (99.5) | 41.9 (107.4) | 39.5 (103.1) | 36.3 (97.3) | 32.5 (90.5) | 27.9 (82.2) | 18.9 (66.0) | 41.9 (107.4) |
| Mean daily maximum °C (°F) | 6.6 (43.9) | 8.3 (46.9) | 11.9 (53.4) | 15.5 (59.9) | 20.8 (69.4) | 25.0 (77.0) | 28.6 (83.5) | 28.5 (83.3) | 23.9 (75.0) | 17.7 (63.9) | 11.7 (53.1) | 7.6 (45.7) | 17.2 (62.9) |
| Daily mean °C (°F) | 2.7 (36.9) | 4.0 (39.2) | 7.0 (44.6) | 10.2 (50.4) | 14.9 (58.8) | 18.5 (65.3) | 21.4 (70.5) | 21.3 (70.3) | 17.7 (63.9) | 12.7 (54.9) | 7.7 (45.9) | 4.1 (39.4) | 11.8 (53.3) |
| Mean daily minimum °C (°F) | −1.1 (30.0) | −0.3 (31.5) | 2.1 (35.8) | 4.9 (40.8) | 8.9 (48.0) | 12.1 (53.8) | 14.3 (57.7) | 14.2 (57.6) | 11.6 (52.9) | 7.7 (45.9) | 3.6 (38.5) | 0.5 (32.9) | 6.5 (43.8) |
| Record low °C (°F) | −16.0 (3.2) | −19.2 (−2.6) | −13.5 (7.7) | −8.0 (17.6) | −4.0 (24.8) | 1.5 (34.7) | 2.1 (35.8) | 3.0 (37.4) | −1.0 (30.2) | −5.0 (23.0) | −11.4 (11.5) | −14.0 (6.8) | −19.2 (−2.6) |
| Average precipitation mm (inches) | 78.5 (3.09) | 78.5 (3.09) | 67.6 (2.66) | 75.7 (2.98) | 54.6 (2.15) | 45.9 (1.81) | 26.5 (1.04) | 40.2 (1.58) | 58.4 (2.30) | 81.4 (3.20) | 119.5 (4.70) | 105.8 (4.17) | 832.6 (32.77) |
| Average precipitation days | 8.4 | 8.5 | 8.6 | 9.7 | 8.1 | 6.2 | 4.2 | 4.4 | 6.0 | 7.8 | 10.0 | 9.8 | 91.7 |
Source: Regione Abruzzo
