= Pescara Porta Nuova railway station =

Railway station in Italy

Pescara Porta Nuova
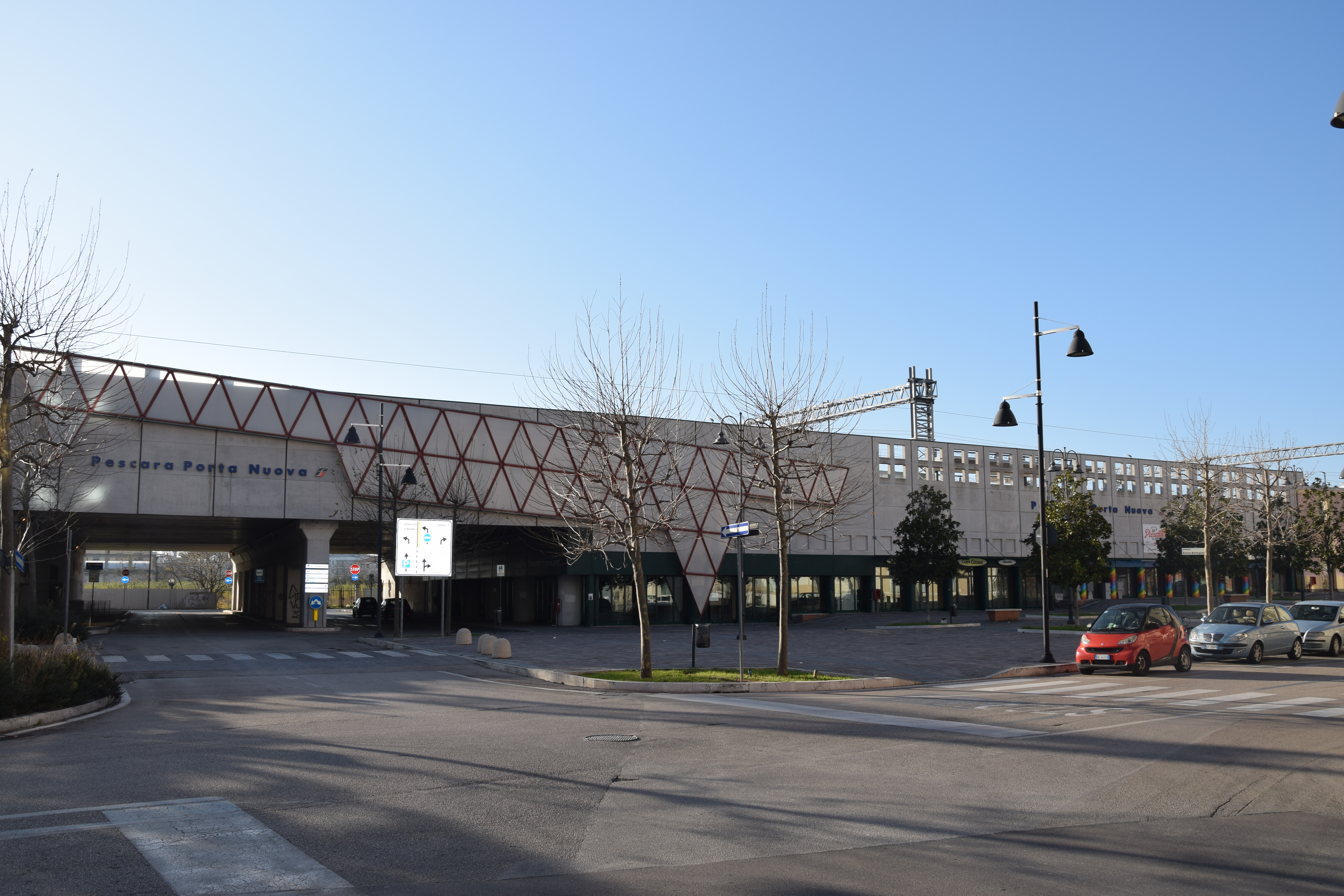
- Pescara Porta Nuova railway station

General information
- Location: Piazza Vittorio Colonna 1, Pescara, Province of Pescara, Abruzzo; Italy
- Coordinates: 42°27′26″N 14°12′43″E
- Owner: Rete Ferroviaria Italiana
- Operator: Trenitalia
- Lines: Adriatic railway Rome–Sulmona–Pescara railway
- Platforms: 3

Other information
- Classification: Silver

History
- Opened: 1883; 143 years ago
Location
- Location within Abruzzo Location within Italy

Pescara Porta Nuova is a railway station in Pescara, Italy. The station opened in 1883 and is located on the Adriatic railway and Rome–Sulmona–Pescara railway. The train services are operated by Trenitalia.

== History ==
Until 1927 the station was named simply Pescara since it is located in the old town of Pescara, located south of the river.

== Modernisation ==
On 15 January 2009 the new passenger building was completed, designed by the Spanish architect Oriol Bohigas and cost tens of millions of euros. The original building was in a state of decay, and therefore was demolished, however leaving the old front of the building as an element of the new building. The work was carried out as part of the redevelopment of the area "The Mill" (Italian: Il Molino).

The station has three tracks, two of which loops to the Adriatic line. The third is the start of the Rome-Pescara railway. Work is under way to upgrade the station, increasing the number of tracks to 4 and building three platforms to modern European standards, with shelters, subways and various furnishings. The works are carried out by RFI, costing about 10 million. These interventions will help increasing the line speed on the Adriatic. the work will be completed in the first half of 2016.

== Train services ==
The station is served by the following service(s):

- Regional services (Treno regionale) Rimini - Ancona - Pescara - Termoli
- Regional services (Treno regionale) Pescara - Chieti - Sulmona - Avezzano - Tivoli - Rome
- Regional services (Treno regionale) Teramo - Giulianova - Pescara - Chieti - Sulmona - Avezzano
