= Pescara San Marco railway station =

Railway station in Pescara, Italy

Pescara San Marco
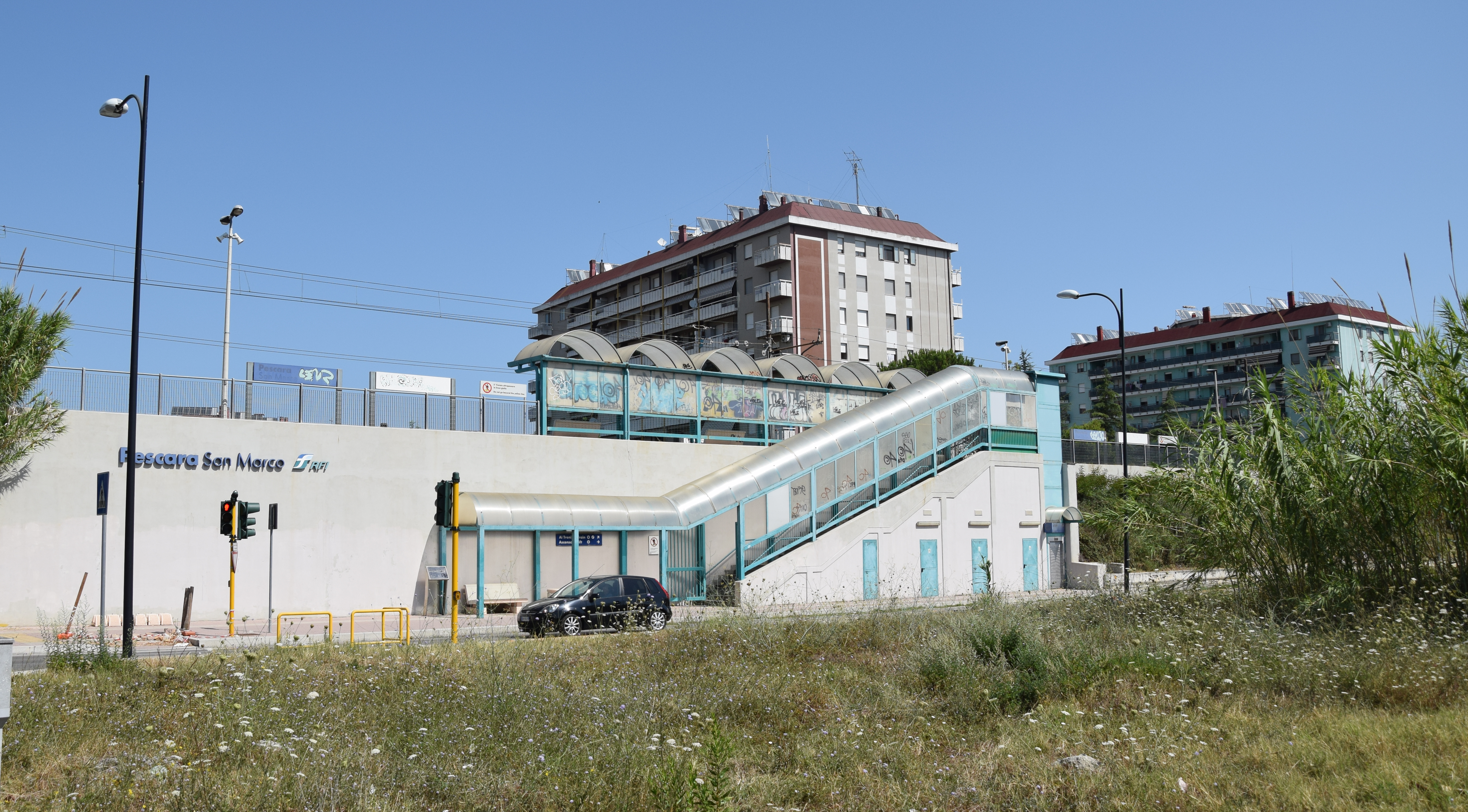
- Pescara San Marco railway station

General information
- Location: Via Po, Pescara, Province of Pescara, Abruzzo; Italy
- Coordinates: 42°26′39″N 14°12′26″E
- Owner: Rete Ferroviaria Italiana
- Operator: Trenitalia
- Line: Rome–Sulmona–Pescara railway
- Platforms: 1

Other information
- Classification: Bronze

History
- Opened: 27 November 2005; 20 years ago
Location
- Location within Abruzzo Location within Italy

Pescara San Marco is a railway station in Pescara, Italy. The station opened on 27 November 2005 and is located on the Rome–Sulmona–Pescara railway. The train services are operated by Trenitalia.

== Train services ==
The station is served by the following service(s):

- Regional services (Treno regionale) Teramo - Giulianova - Pescara - Chieti - Sulmona - Avezzano
