= Hermitage of San Venanzio, Raiano =

Hermitage in Raiano, Italy

Coordinates: 42.110987°N 13.795971°E

Hermitage of San Venanzio
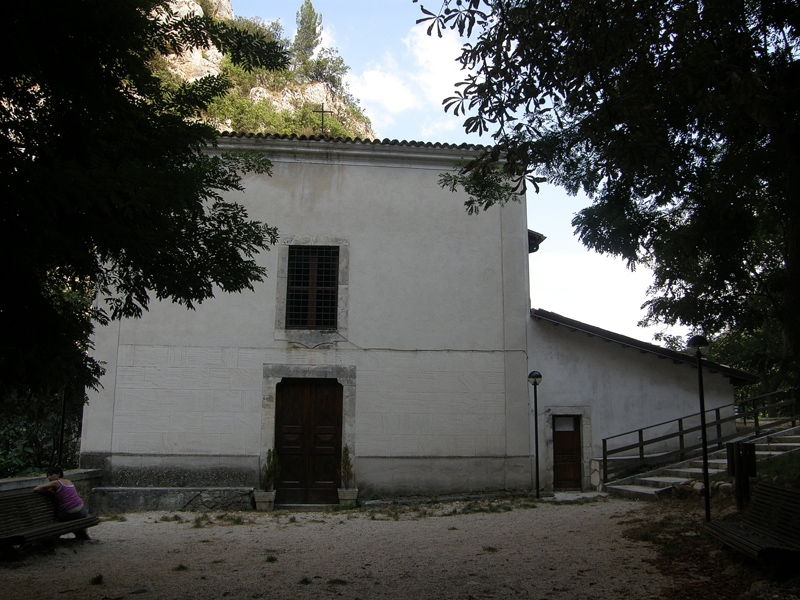
- Eremo di San Venanzio

Religion
- Affiliation: Roman Catholic

Location
- Location: Raiano, Italy
- Interactive map of Hermitage of San Venanzio

Architecture
- Completed: 12th-century

The Hermitage of San Venanzio (Eremo di San Venanzio) is the site the ancient hermitage of Saint Venantius of Camerino, located above a stream in a remote ravine within a few kilometers north of Raiano, Province of L'Aquila in the Abruzzo, Italy.

== History ==
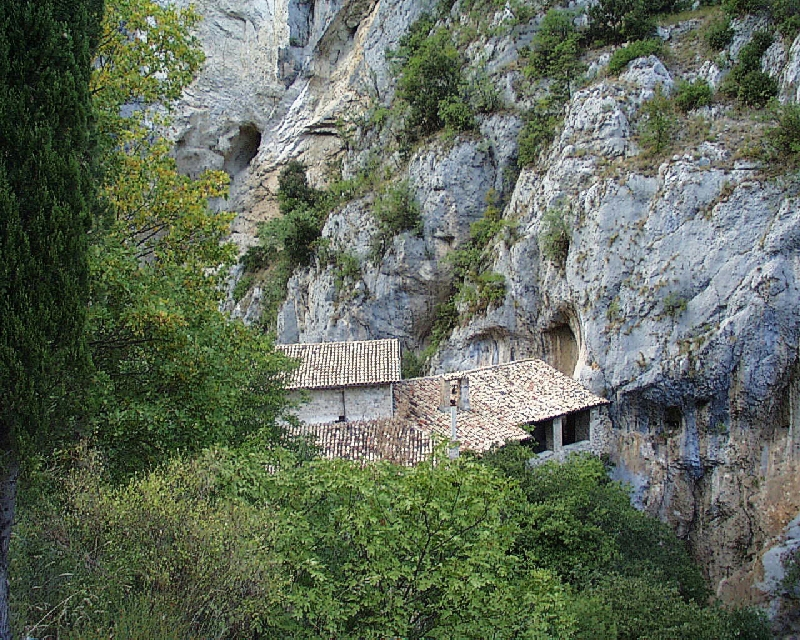
Hermitage of Saint Venantius

This type of structures, where caves or grottoes in remote mountainous terrain became the site of anchoritic habitation, and later hagiographic devotional cults, are not uncommon in the terrain of the high Apennines and Abruzzo, which also harbors the hermitages of San Bartolomeo in Legio, of San Domenico, and of Celestino V near Sulmona.

The hermitage is now associated with a pilgrimage church. Venantius converted to Christianity in the 3rd century, and was martyred nearby in 259. According to tradition, the hermitage was constructed in the 12th-century, though the structure suggests some 15th-century construction. Papal bulls from Adrian IV (1156), Lucius III (1183) and Clement III (1188), refer to a St Venantius temple, but it is not clear if they refer to the church in the town or the hermitage.

The church was built straddling the river. Inside are two lateral altars dedicated to San Pietro Celestino and St John the Baptist. Before the main altar is a balustrade that leads to a "Scala Santa", dug into the rock and leading to a grotto identified as the site where the body of San Venanzio left an imprint, while he prayed. Traces of 15th-century frescoes exist. Levels of loggias allowed pilgrims to gaze on the spot. To the left of the entrance is a seat, called the seat of Pope Celestine or St Rina. The hermitage has undergone modest reconstructions along the centuries. In the 19th century, it was visited by the Neapolitan historian Benedetto Croce, who noted the church was full of ex-voto tablets, now lost.

Along the road leading to the sanctuary are three aedicules that held imprints left by body parts of the saint, mainly elbow, head and feet. Prayers at the individual stations with insertion of the afflicted matching body part were held to provide cures. The latter is the most notable. A legend claims the saint was able to placate riots in the nearby town of Corfinio by leaving the imprint of his foot on the rock. Rocks placed in the imprint of the feet are held to gain the power to heal. Water and grains from the path were also held to have healing powers.
