= Venantius of Camerino =

Patron saint in Italy

Saint Venantius of Camerino
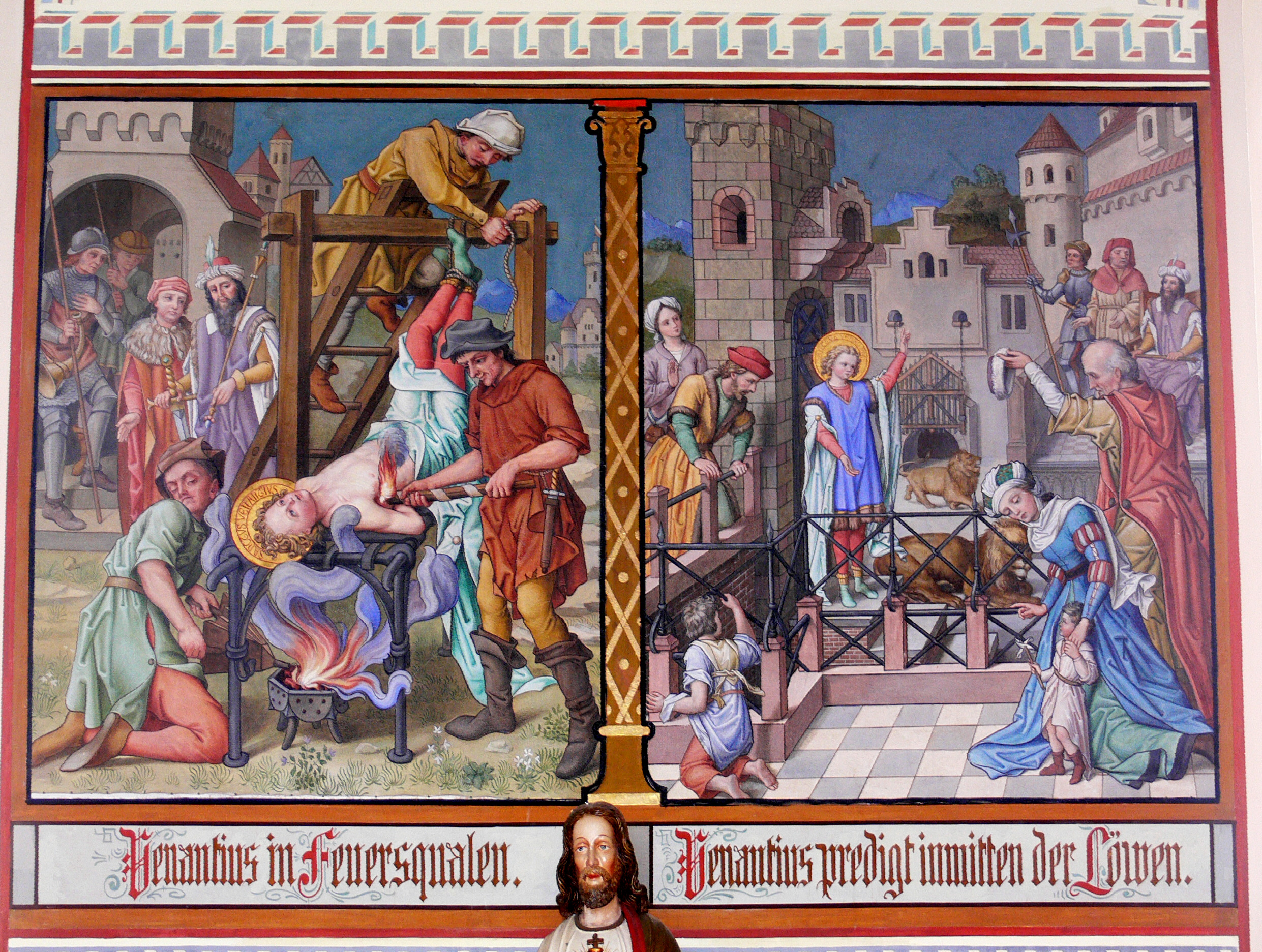
- Venantius is hung upside-down over a fire, and then thrown to the lions. Wall mural from St. Venantius Church, Horgenzell.
- Died: ~250 AD
- Venerated in: Roman Catholic Church; Eastern Orthodox Church
- Major shrine: Camerino and Raiano (AQ)
- Feast: May 18
- Attributes: young man crucified upside-down with smoke coming from his head; young man holding the citadel of Camerino; young man holding the city of Camerino, a palm, and a book; young man with a banner holding a city wall
- Patronage: Camerino and Raiano (AQ)

Venantius of Camerino (Italian: San Venanzio, also known as Saint Wigand) (died 18 May 251 or 253) is the patron saint of Camerino, Italy and Raiano, Italy. Christian tradition holds that he was a 15-year-old who was tortured, and martyred by decapitation at Camerino during the persecutions of Decius. Martyred with him were 10 other Christians, including the priest Porphyrius, Venantius' tutor; and Leontius, bishop of Camerino.

Before Venantius was killed, he was scourged, burned with flaming torches, hanged upside-down over a fire, had his teeth knocked out and his jaw broken, thrown to the lions, and tossed over a high cliff. His 11th century Acts state additionally that he managed to briefly escape from Camerino and hide at Raiano, where a church was later dedicated to him.

== Veneration ==
Venantius was buried outside the city walls of Camerino, where a basilica was built in the fifth century, and later rebuilt many times in succeeding centuries. The veneration of Venantius became popular: his image appeared on coins and his name in litanies; springs near the basilica, which were associated with the saint, were used by lepers and people with peptic ulcers to cure their afflictions. Venantius subsequently replaced Saint Ansovinus as the city's patron saint.

In 1259, during the destruction and sacking of Camerino by the troops of Manfred of Sicily, the relics of Venantius were transported to safety to the Castel dell'Ovo at Naples. They were restored to Camerino in 1269 by order of Pope Clement IV, an opponent of Manfred.

In the 17th century, Pope Clement X, who was a former bishop of Camerino, further contributed to the spread of his veneration: he raised the saint's feast to the level of a double rite and composed hymns for Venantius' office.

In the General Roman Calendar of 1670–1969 he has a third-class feast on 18 May.

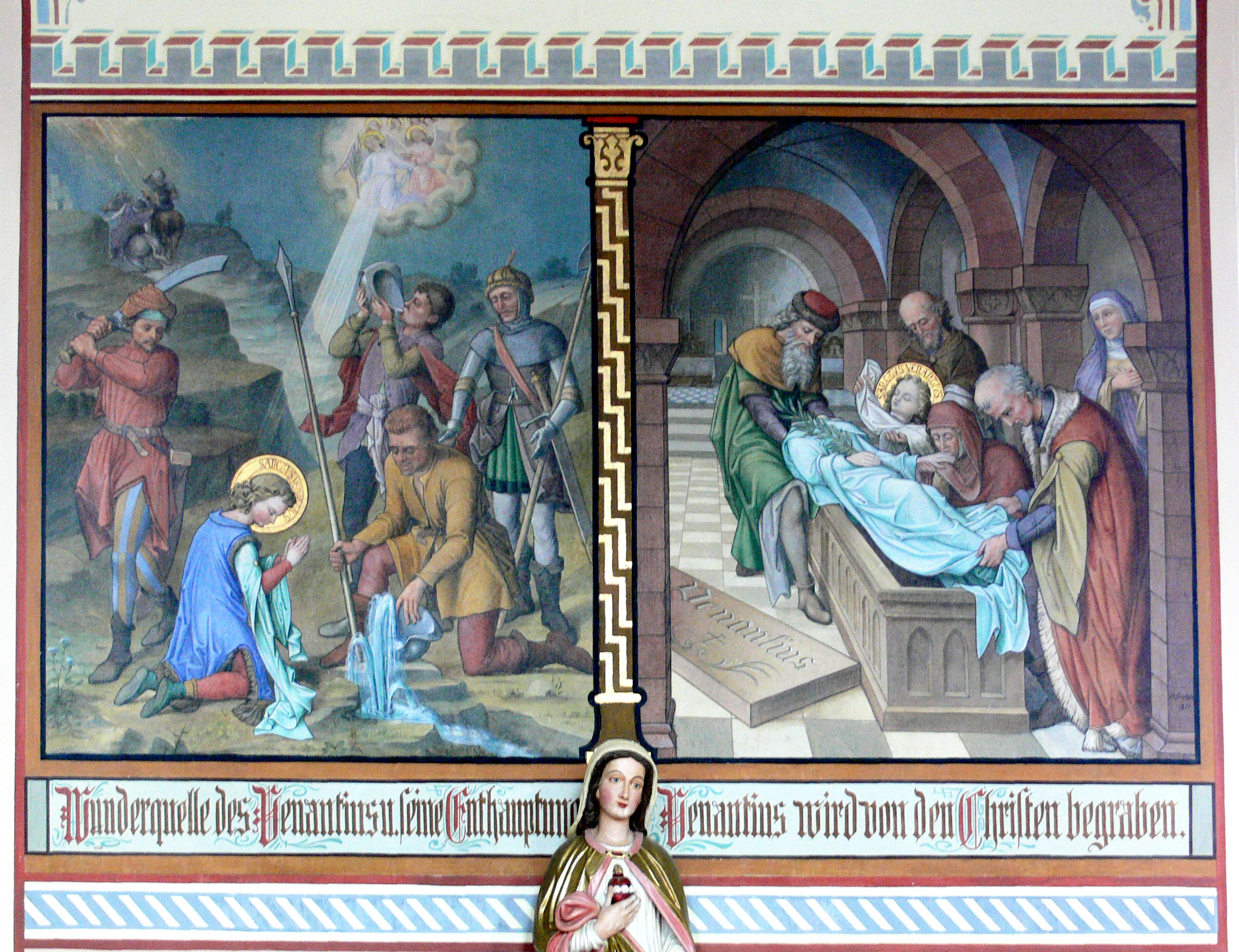
Venantius is decapitated and then buried.

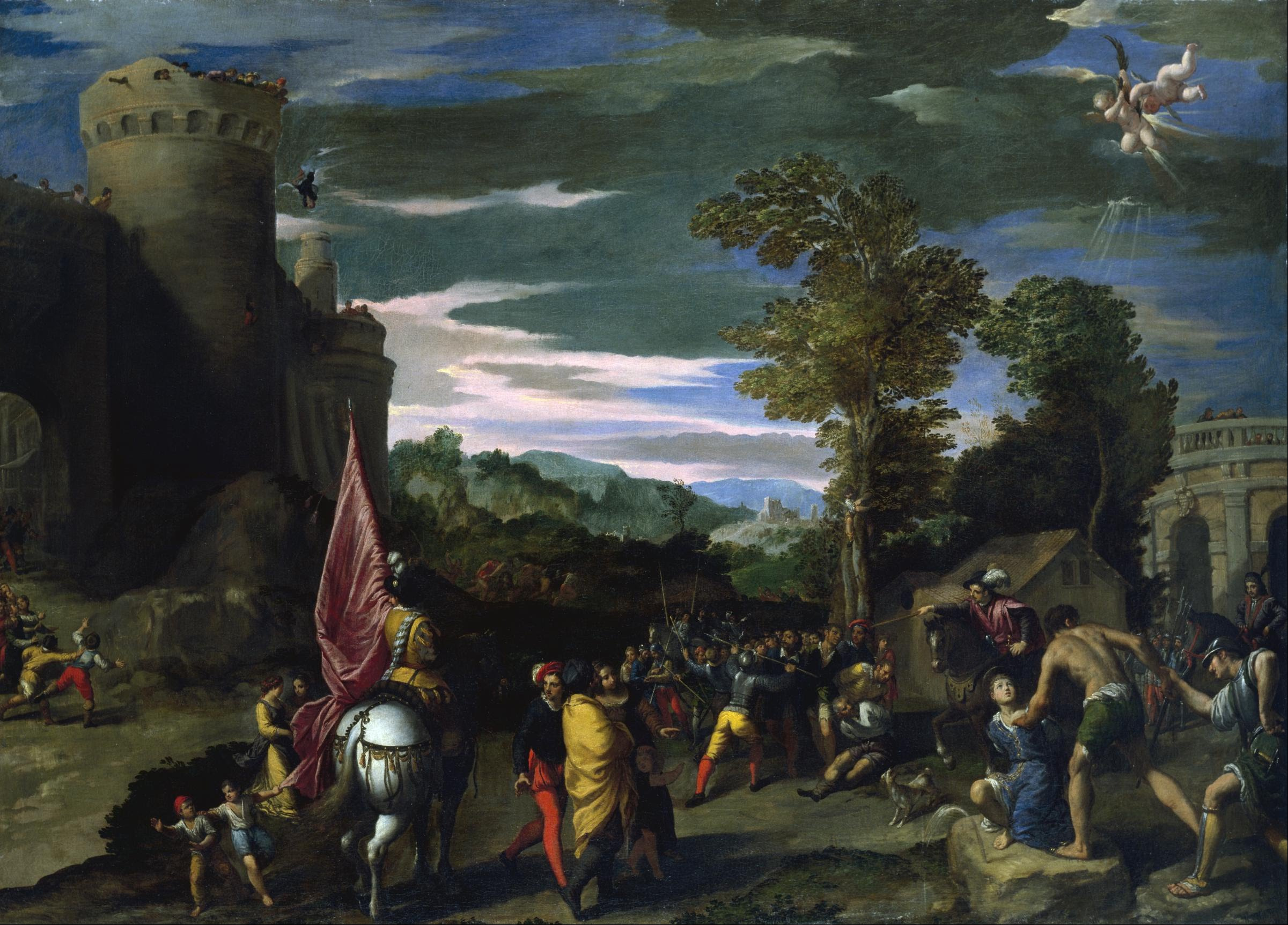
Martyrdom of St. Venantius of Camerino by Scarsellino

== See also ==
- Hermitage of Saint Venantius
- Saint Venantius of Camerino, patron saint archive
