= Pescara Centrale railway station =

Railway station in Pescara, Italy

Pescara Centrale
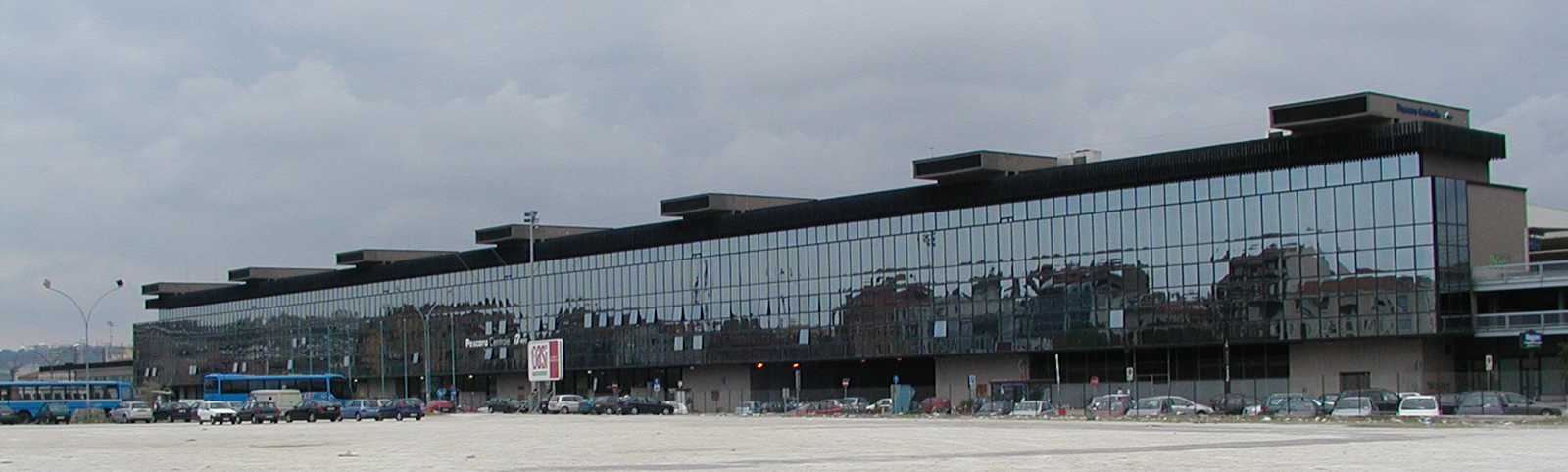
- Exterior of the station building

General information
- Location: Via Enzo Ferrari; 65124 Pescara PE; Pescara, Pescara, Abruzzo; Italy
- Coordinates: 42°28′04″N 14°12′15″E
- Operator: Rete Ferroviaria Italiana; Centostazioni
- Lines: Ancona–Lecce (Trenitalia); Rome-Pescara
- Distance: 349.969 km (217.461 mi) from Bologna Centrale
- Platforms: 8+2
- Train operators: Trenitalia
- Connections: Urban and suburban buses

Other information
- Classification: Gold

History
- Opened: 1987
Location
- Location within Abruzzo Location within Italy

Pescara Centrale railway station (Italian: stazione ferroviaria di Pescara Centrale), also known as Pescara railway station (Italian: stazione ferroviaria di Pescara), is the main railway station of Pescara. The station lies on the Adriatic line from Rimini to Lecce and the trans-Apennine line to Rome. It serves an average of 3.5 million people per year and is a 5-minute walk to the city's main street and to the beach.

The commercial area of the passenger building is managed by Centostazioni SpA, whereas the Italian Railway Network (RFI) is responsible for the railway infrastructure.

== Architecture ==
The former headquarters of Pescara Central Station was a nineteenth-century palace at the same site. The initial draft of a new passenger building was drawn up in 1962 by Corrado Cameli Service Work for the FS. This draft proposed a steel-frame structure of the new station building, but changed to pre-stressed concrete in 1970, when structural calculations were carried out by the Studio Engineer Giovanni Cerasoli and Piero di Pescara, with the advice from the engineer Carlo Guidi Baskets. The modern-day building is one of the earliest constructions to be made of pre-stressed concrete among Italian railway stations.

The new station building was completed in 1987, when all eight railway tracks in and out of the station being raised to viaduct levels to avoid ground level-crossings.

== Train services ==
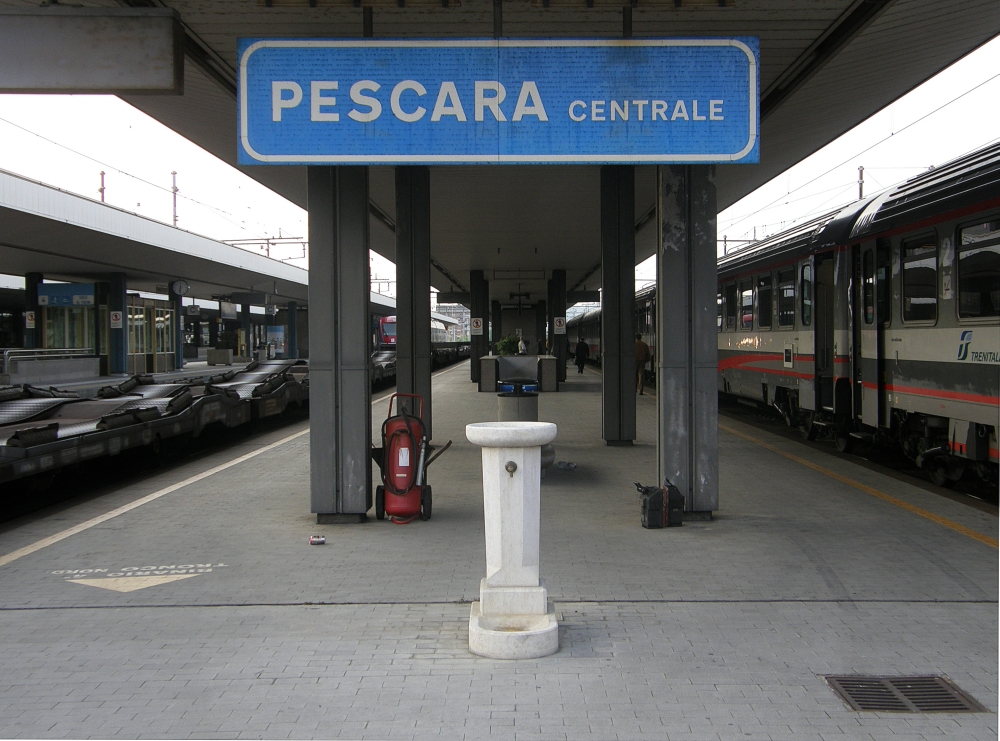
Pescara Centrale

The station is served by the following services (incomplete):

- High speed services (Frecciarossa) Milan - Bologna - Ancona - Pescara - Foggia - Bari
- High speed services (Frecciabianca) Milan - Parma - Bologna - Ancona - Pescara - Foggia - Bari - Brindisi - Lecce
- High speed services (Frecciabianca) Milan - Parma - Bologna - Ancona - Pescara - Foggia - Bari - Taranto
- High speed services (Frecciabianca) Turin - Parma - Bologna - Ancona - Pescara - Foggia - Bari - Brindisi - Lecce
- High speed services (Frecciabianca) Venice - Padua - Bologna - Ancona - Pescara - Foggia - Bari - Brindisi - Lecce
- Intercity services Bologna - Rimini - Ancona - Pescara - Foggia - Bari - Brindisi - Lecce
- Intercity services Bologna - Rimini - Ancona - Pescara - Foggia - Bari - Taranto
- Night train (Intercity Notte) Milan - Parma - Bologna - Ancona - Pescara - Foggia - Bari - Brindisi - Lecce
- Night train (Intercity Notte) Milan - Ancona - Pescara - Foggia - Bari - Taranto - Brindisi - Lecce
- Night train (Intercity Notte) Turin - Alessandria - Bolgona - Ancona - Pescara - Foggia - Bari - Brindisi - Lecce
- Express services (Regionale Veloce) Milan - Bologna - Rimini - Ancona - Pescara (weekends only)
- Regional services (Treno regionale) Rimini - Pesaro - Ancona - Civitanova Marche - San Benedetto del Tronto - Pescara
- Regional services (Treno regionale) Pescara - Chieti - Sulmona - Avezzano - Carsoli - Tivoli - Rome
- Regional services (Treno regionale) Teramo - Giulianova - Pescara - Chieti - Sulmona - Avezzano
- Regional services (Treno regionale) Teramo / San Benedetto del Tronto - Pescara - Ortona - San Vito Lanciano - Termoli
- Local services (Treno regionale) San Benedetto del Tronto - Pescara - Ortona San Vito Lanciano - Lanciano

== Interchanges ==
The bus station is located at the front of Pescara Centrale railway station. Bus services include connections within Pescara to Chieti, Lanciano, and Abruzzo Airport (Urban Bus no. 38). Long-distance coaches to Rome-Tiburtina and Bologna have their terminus at this bus station in Pescara.

From the bus station in front of the station there has been a daily connection of ITA Airways by bus, to and from Rome Fiumicino Airport since 1 December 2022, allowing a connection with the airline's hub.

== Services ==
The station building hosts a ticket office, automatic ticket machines, two newspaper stands, a cafe bar, and a pharmacy. During the night hours, entry into the station building is only permitted for passengers with valid InterCity Notte (ICN) tickets.

== See also ==
- History of rail transport in Italy
- List of railway stations in Abruzzo
- Rail transport in Italy
- Railway stations in Italy
