= Alba Adriatica–Nereto–Controguerra railway station =

Railway station in Italy

Alba Adriatica–Nereto–Controguerra

General information
- Location: Via Regina Margherita 11, Alba Adriatica, Province of Teramo, Abruzzo; Italy
- Coordinates: 42°50′03″N 13°55′00″E
- System: Railway Station
- Owner: Rete Ferroviaria Italiana
- Operator: Trenitalia
- Line: Adriatic railway
- Distance: 302.190 km (187.772 mi) from Bologna Centrale
- Platforms: 2
- Tracks: 2

Other information
- Classification: Bronze
Location
- Location within Italy

Alba Adriatica–Nereto–Controguerra (Italian: Stazione di Alba Adriatica–Nereto–Controguerra) is a railway station serving the towns of Alba Adriatica, Nereto and Controguerra in the region of Abruzzo, Italy. The station is located on the Adriatic railway and the train services are operated by Trenitalia and Ferrovia Adriatico Sangritana.

The train station opened in 1863 as the 'Tortoreto-Nereto-Controguerra'.

== Train services ==
The station is served by the following service(s):

- Express services (Regionale Veloce) Milan - Bologna - Rimini - Ancona - Pescara (weekends only)
- Regional services (Treno regionale) Rimini - Pesaro - Ancona - Civitanova Marche - San Benedetto del Tronto - Pescara
- Local services (Treno regionale) San Benedetto del Tronto - Pescara - Lanciano
