= Raiano railway station =

Italian railway station

Raiano

General information
- Location: Via Stazione, Raiano, Province of L'Aquila, Abruzzo; Italy
- Coordinates: 42°05′53″N 13°48′32″E
- Owner: Rete Ferroviaria Italiana
- Operator: Trenitalia
- Line: Terni–Sulmona railway
- Platforms: 2

Other information
- Classification: Bronze

History
- Opened: 1875; 151 years ago
Location
- Location within Abruzzo Location within Italy

Raiano is a railway station in Raiano, Italy. The station is located on the Terni–Sulmona railway. The train services are operated by Trenitalia.

== History ==
The station was opened in 1875 and, unfortunately, suffered the bombing of the Second World War, but was rebuilt immediately afterwards. The passenger building is equipped with a waiting room with a validator of tickets. There are 2 tracks, passenger trains cross each other.

== Train services ==
The station is served by the following service(s):

- Regional services (Treno regionale) L'Aquila - Sulmona
