= San Vincenzo Valle Roveto =

- Comune
- Comune di San Vincenzo Valle Roveto
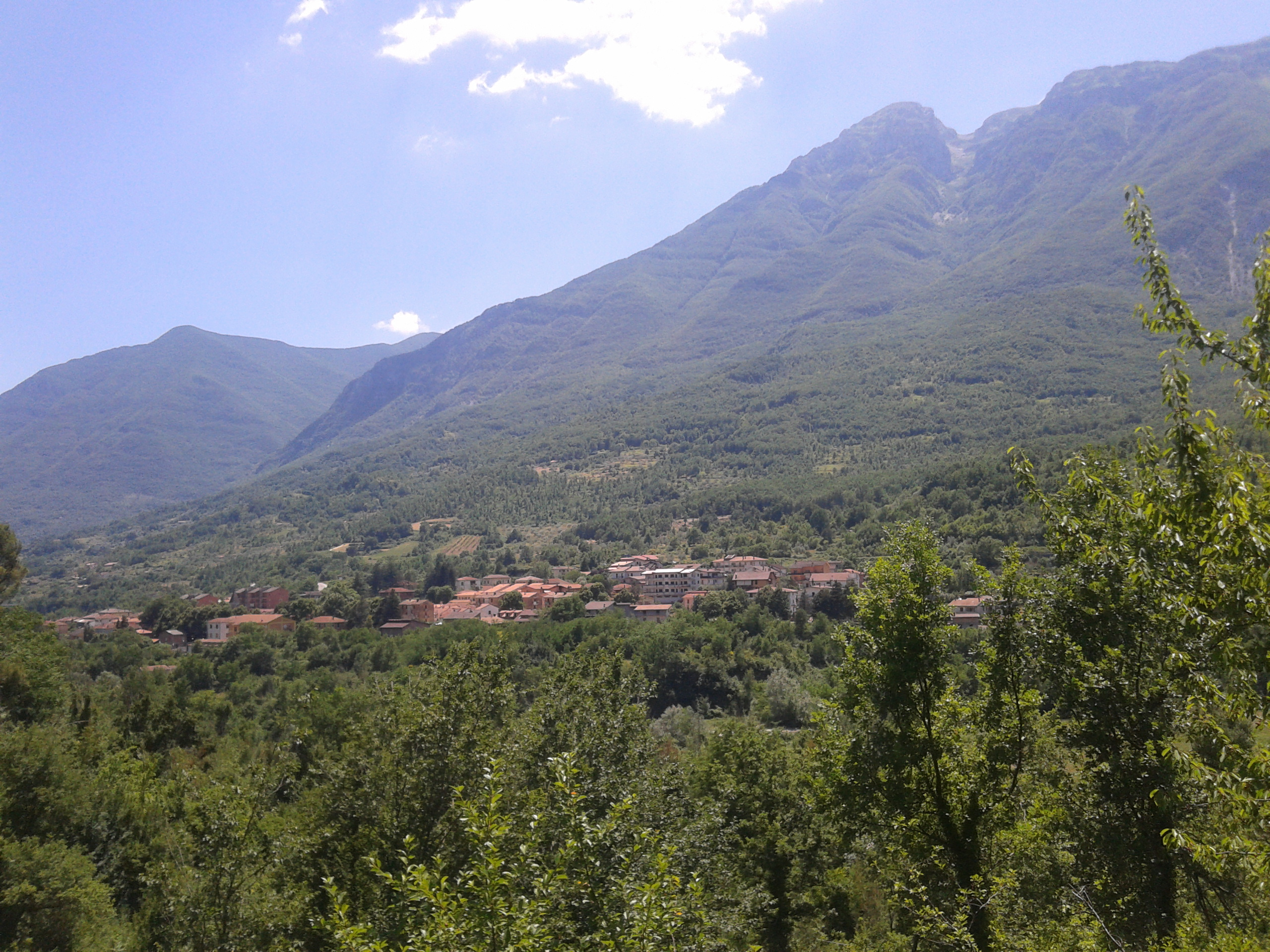

- Coat of arms

- Location within Italy Location within Abruzzo
- Coordinates: 41°50′47″N 13°32′12″E
- Country: Italy
- Region: Abruzzo
- Province: L'Aquila (AQ)
- Frazioni: Castronovo, Morrea, Roccavivi, Rosce, San Giovanni Nuovo, San Giovanni Vecchio, San Vincenzo Superiore, Santa Restituta, Velarde

Government
  - Mayor: Giulio Lancia

Area
  - Total: 46.04 km^{2} (17.78 sq mi)
- Elevation: 388 m (1,273 ft)

Population (31 October 2017)
  - Total: 2,302
  - Density: 50.00/km^{2} (129.5/sq mi)
- Demonym: Sanvincenzesi
- Time zone: UTC+1 (CET)
  - Summer (DST): UTC+2 (CEST)
- Postal code: 67050
- Dialing code: 0863
- Saint day: January 22
- Website: Official website

San Vincenzo Valle Roveto is a comune and town in the province of L'Aquila in the Abruzzo region of Italy.

== Geography ==
The town is located at an altitude of 388 meters above sea level, along the Roveto valley, in Marsica.

== History ==
The medieval village, dating back to around the year one thousand, developed near the church dedicated to St. Vincent martyr, patron saint of the town. The church already depended in the 11th-12th centuries on the Casamari abbey, in the neighboring Latin Valley. The history of the town has always been linked to that of the nearby and more important medieval castle of Morrea, most likely already present in ancient documents dating back to the year 702 with the toponym of Horrea.
