= Angitia =

Ancient Italic goddess

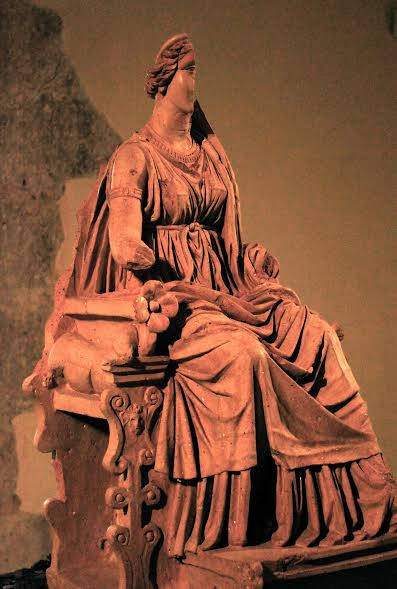
Terracotta statue believed to depict Angitia, in Marsica, Italy

Angitia was a goddess among the Marsi, the Paeligni and other Oscan-Umbrian peoples of central Italy. She was associated in antiquity with snake-charmers who claimed her as their ancestor. Roman interpretations probably obscure her Marsian significance.

Angitia's myths vary. According to Gnaeus Gellius (late 2nd century BC), Angitia was one of the three daughters of Aeëtes, along with Medea and Circe, two of the most famed sorceresses of Greek myth. Circe, as widely known from the Odyssey, practiced transforming spells; Medea ended up in Italy, where her son ruled over the Marsi. Angitia lived in the area around the Fucine Lake and specialized in curing snakebites.

Angitia is attested by inscriptions in the territory of the Marsi and elsewhere in the Central Apennines. She is named in three inscriptions from Luco dei Marsi, in antiquity known as Lucus Angitiae ("Sacred Grove of Angitia"). The earliest is a dedication to the goddess "on behalf of the Marsic legions," dating to the late 4th century BC. The name also appears on a dedicatory cippus from Civita d'Antino, in the Umbrian Iguvine Tablets, and in inscriptions in the territories of the Paeligni, Vestini, and Sabines. She is mentioned along with Angerona in one inscription, and in another her name appears in the plural. Another indicates that she had a temple and a treasury. The Romans derived her name from anguis, "serpent," hence the form Anguitia.

As snakes were often associated with the healing arts in antiquity (see, for instance, rod of Asclepius), Angitia is believed to have been mainly a goddess of thaumaturgy. She had powers of witchcraft, magic and medicine being regarded as complementary in the ancient world, and was a master in the art of miraculous and herbal healing, especially when it came to snakebites. She was also attributed with a wide range of powers over snakes, including the power to kill snakes with a touch.

According to the account given by Servius, Angitia was of Greek origin, for Arigitia was the name given by the Marrubians to Medea, who after having left Colchis came to Italy with Jason and taught the people the above-mentioned remedies. Silius Italicus identifies her as Medea.

== See also ==
- Bona Dea
