= Prezza, Abruzzo =

Town and comune in L'Aquila, Abruzzo, Italy

Prezza
- Comune
- Comune di Prezza
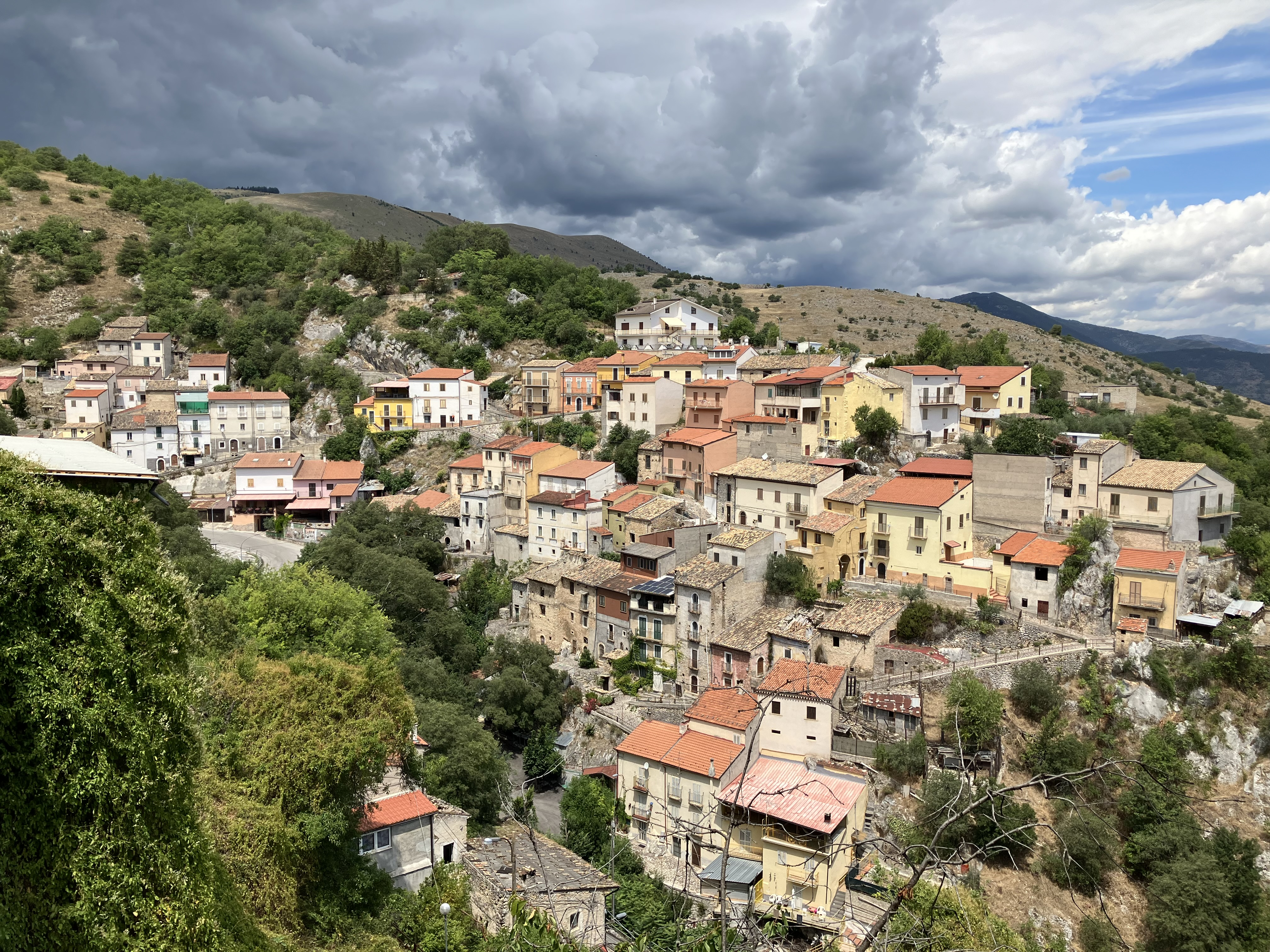
- Prezza, AQ

- Location within Italy Location within Abruzzo
- Coordinates: 42°3′37″N 13°50′8″E
- Country: Italy
- Region: Abruzzo
- Province: L'Aquila (AQ)
- Frazioni: Campo di Fano, Colli di Prezza

Government
  - Mayor: Marianna Scoccia

Area
  - Total: 21.6 km^{2} (8.3 sq mi)
- Elevation: 480 m (1,570 ft)

Population (1 January 2023)
  - Total: 847
  - Density: 39.2/km^{2} (102/sq mi)
- Demonym: Prezzani
- Time zone: UTC+1 (CET)
  - Summer (DST): UTC+2 (CEST)
- Postal code: 67030
- Dialing code: 0864
- ISTAT code: 066076
- Patron saint: Santa Lucia
- Saint day: 13 December
- Website: Official website

Prezza is a town and comune in the province of L'Aquila, Abruzzo, in central Italy. It lies in the Valle Peligna. approximately 8 kilometres west of Sulmona and 60 kilometres southeast of L'Aquila. The town sits at an elevation of about 480 metres (1,575 ft) above sea level and covers an area of approximately 19.7 km². The inhabitants are known as Prezzani.

== History ==
Archaeological evidence suggests that the area around Prezza was inhabited during the Roman period. In medieval documents, the settlement appears under the names Pagus Laverna. In antiquity, the settlement was also referred to as “Villa Carrene” in some medieval sources. It was under the spiritual and economic influence of the Abbey of San Clemente a Casauria, which controlled much of the surrounding territory.

During the Middle Ages, Prezza became a fortified hill town and served as a defensive outpost in the Peligna Valley. In feudal records such as the Catalogus Baronum, it was associated with the Counts of Celano and the neighbouring town of Raiano. In the fifteenth century, the locality was occasionally called Praesidium, a name that reflected its military role. For a time, it was also known as Rocca di Sale , possibly linked to the collection of local tithes or salt dues.

The feudal history of Prezza involved the monks of the Abbey of San Clemente and later the Sansoneschi family around the 9th century.

A major earthquake in 1706 destroyed much of the medieval castle and older buildings; only the bell tower of the Church of Santa Lucia survived. In the following centuries, Prezza was rebuilt, maintaining its network of narrow streets, stone arches, and traditional houses.

== Economy and Culture ==
The economy of Prezza has traditionally been agricultural and pastoral. Local production includes Montepulciano d'Abruzzo wine, olive oil, garlic, artichokes, and traditional sweets such as cioffe.

Patron Saint

The community celebrates its patron saint, Saint Lucia, on 13 December with religious processions and local festivities.

Praesidium Winery

The village also has a well-renowned winery whose name refers to the old name of the commune, Praesidium.

== Geography and Transport ==
Prezza overlooks the Valle Peligna, offering panoramic views of the surrounding Apennines.

The town is accessible via the A25 Autostrada dei Parchi motorway.

== Notable Features ==
The historic centre retains its medieval street plan, with stone portals, vaulted passages, and small squares. The Church of Santa Lucia, rebuilt after the 1706 earthquake, remains the principal religious building in the town. Local oral history recalls acts of solidarity during World War II, when residents sheltered displaced persons and soldiers.

== Murals ==
A mural project in recent years depicts local history on walls around the town.

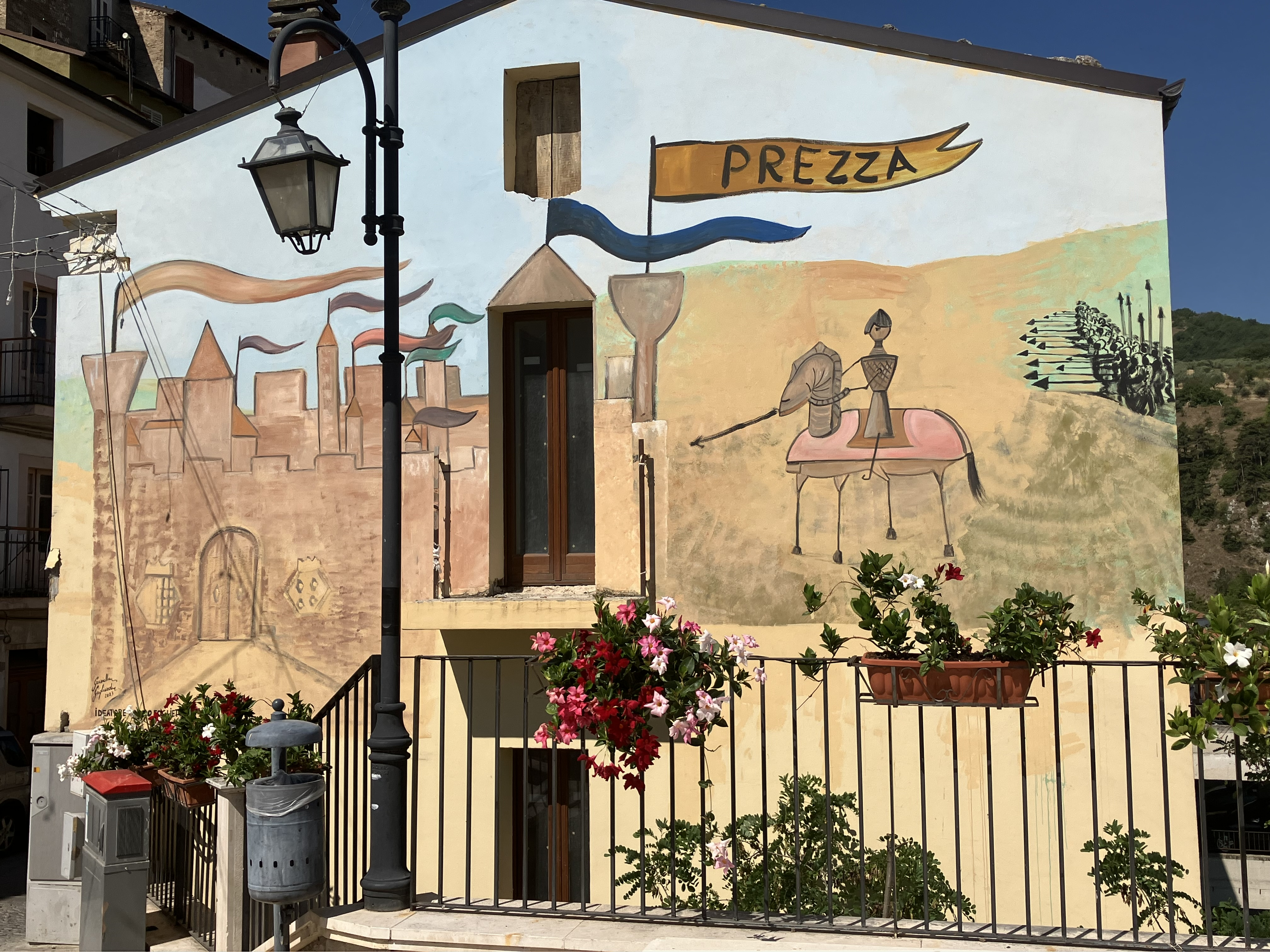
Main mural on the wall to the left of the main piazza

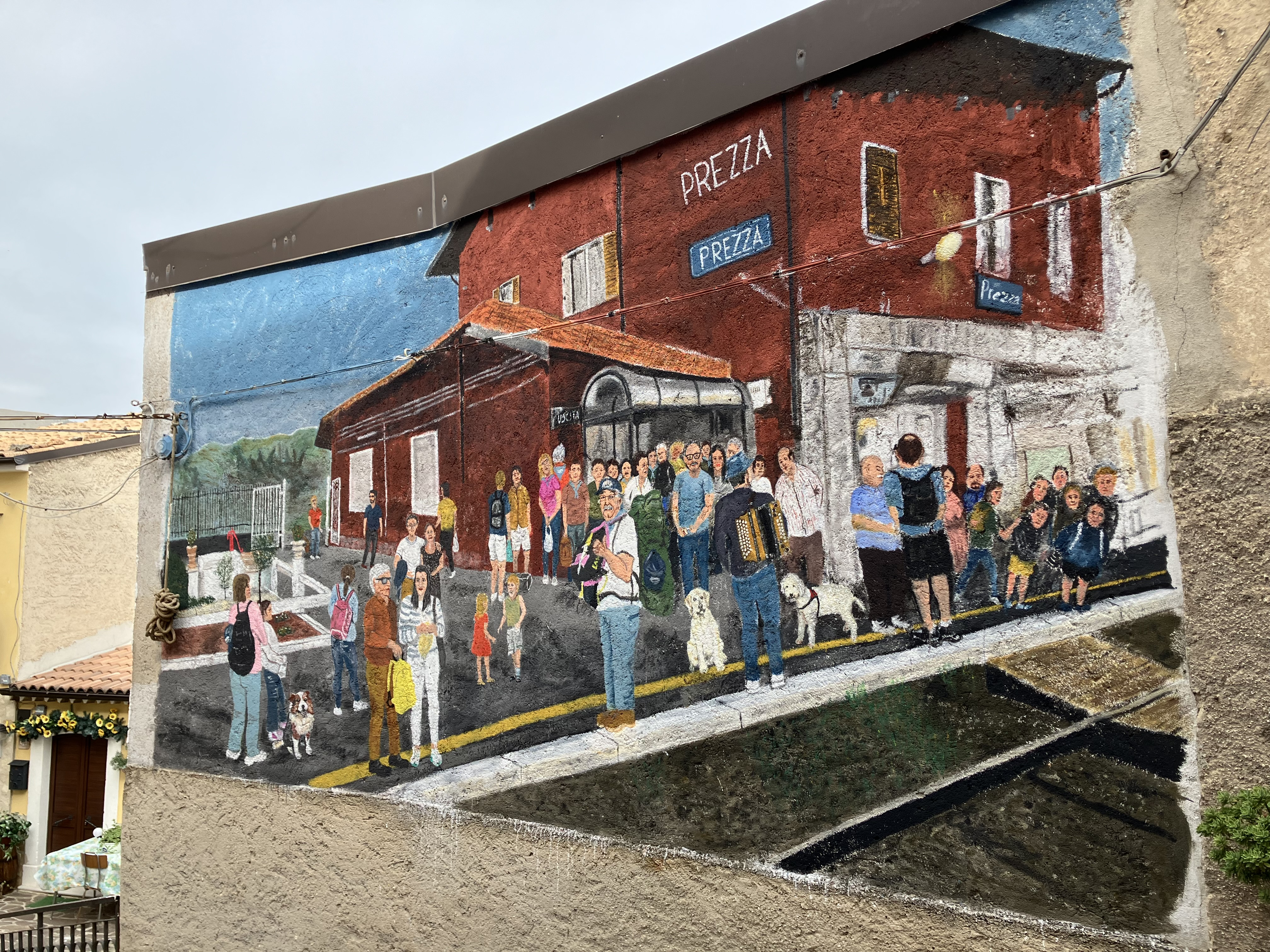
Railway station depiction placed above the main piazza

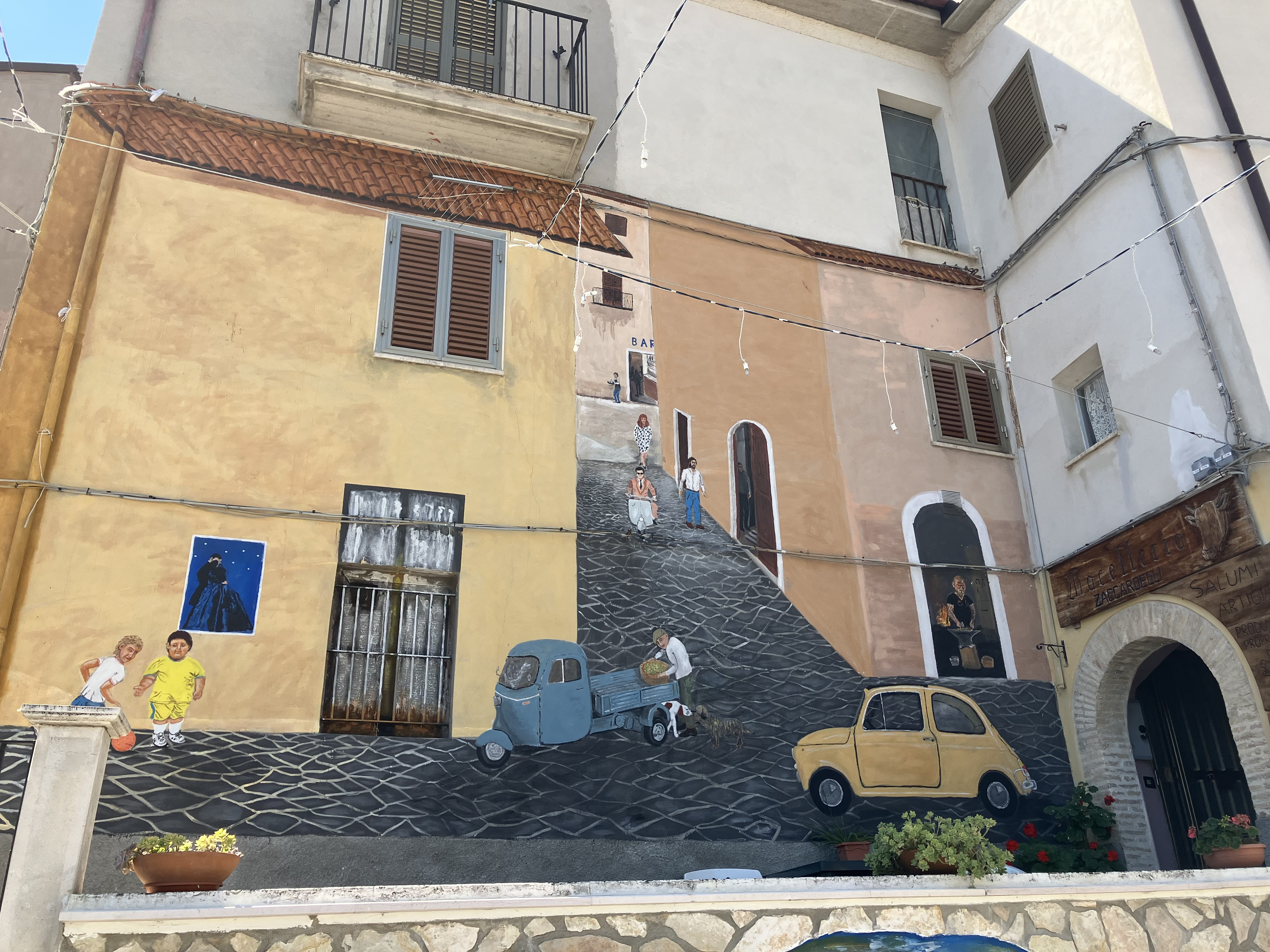
Main mural at the entrance to the macelleria.

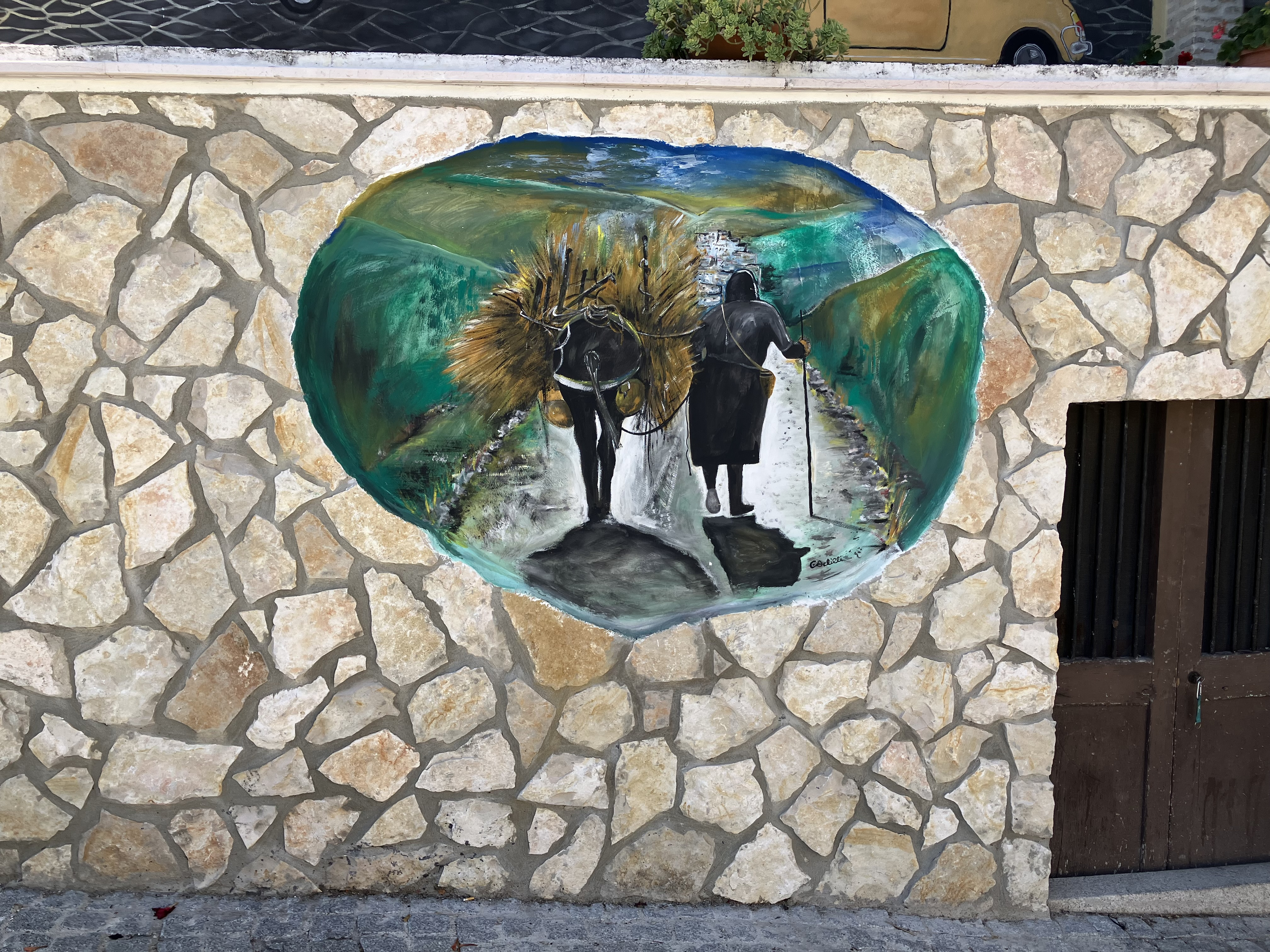
Detail of mural opposite piazza.

== See also ==
- Sulmona
- Raiano
- Abruzzo
- Valle Peligna
