= Raiano =

- Comune
- Comune di Raiano
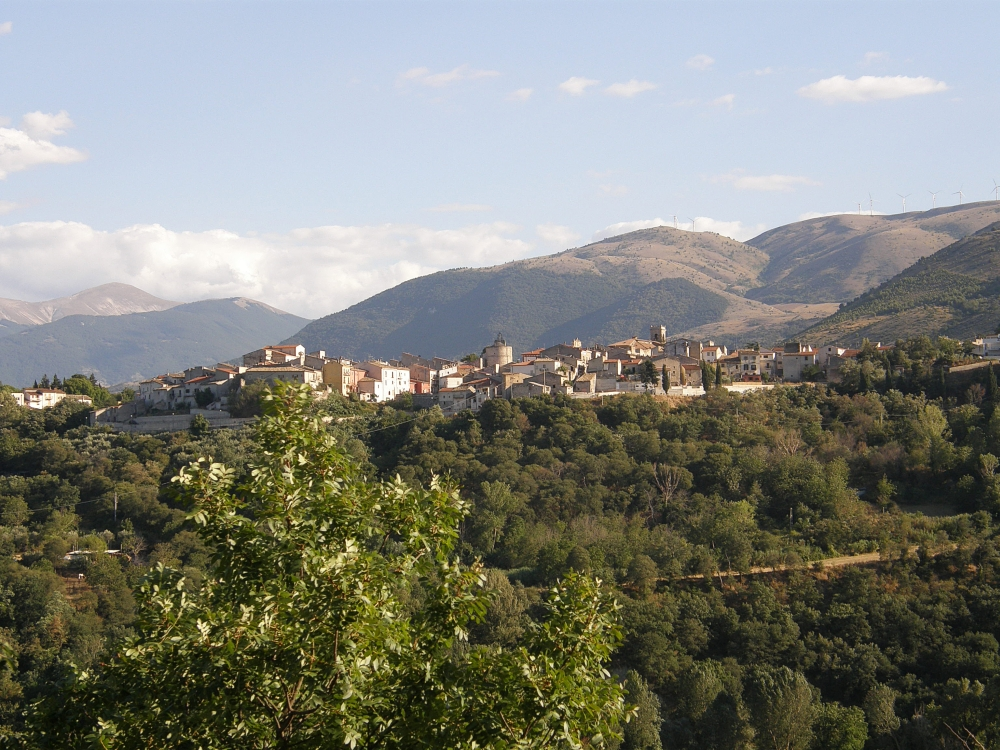

- Coat of arms

- Location within Italy Location within Abruzzo
- Coordinates: 42°6′12″N 13°48′56″E
- Country: Italy
- Region: Abruzzo
- Province: L'Aquila (AQ)

Government
  - Mayor: Marco Moca

Area
  - Total: 29.09 km^{2} (11.23 sq mi)
- Elevation: 390 m (1,280 ft)

Population (1 January 2007)
  - Total: 2,990
  - Density: 103/km^{2} (266/sq mi)
- Demonym: Raianesi
- Time zone: UTC+1 (CET)
  - Summer (DST): UTC+2 (CEST)
- Postal code: 67027
- Dialing code: 0864
- Patron saint: Saint Venantius
- Saint day: 18 May
- Website: Official website

Raiano (locally Raianë) is a town and comune of the province of L'Aquila in the Abruzzo region of Italy.

The closest airport is Abruzzo Airport, which is 38 mile drive. The closest beach is 41 miles from town. There isn't a hospital in Raiano, but the closest available is Ospedale dell'Aquila in the town of L'Aquila, 19 miles drive.

== Geography ==
Raiano is located at 390 metres (1,280 feet) above sea level, on the western side of the Peligna Valley. In his Naturalis Historia, Pliny the Elder subdivided the Peligna region and its people into three categories: Paelignorum Corfinienses, Superequani et Sulmonenses. Raiano lies in the Corfinienses region on the south side of the Aterno river valley, only 3 kilometres (2 miles) from the remains of the ancient city of Corfinium.

== History ==
The Villa Ragiani, or Castrum Radiani, was raised on the hill of Castellone in the Middle Ages, with the earliest references appearing in 872. This little village, that in the 10th century hosted for a short time emperors Otto I and Otto III, was ruled throughout the Middle Ages by the feudal events of the surrounding area and the Kingdom of Sicily, subject to the successive reigns of the Normans, the Hohenstaufen, the Angevins, and the Aragonese.

It maintained a notable importance, however, thanks to the barracks in the north-western Peligna Valley and its strategic position along the old Celano-Foggia Path and the ancient Via Tiburtina Valeria. The old town was deserted in the second half of the 15th century, after many earthquakes.

== Main sights ==
- Hermitage of Saint Venantius
- Raiano baths Spa

== Transport ==
Raiano is served by the Raiano railway station, on the Terni–Sulmona railway, with trains to L'Aquila and Sulmona.
