= Rome–Sulmona–Pescara railway =

Railway line in Italy

Rome–Pescara railway
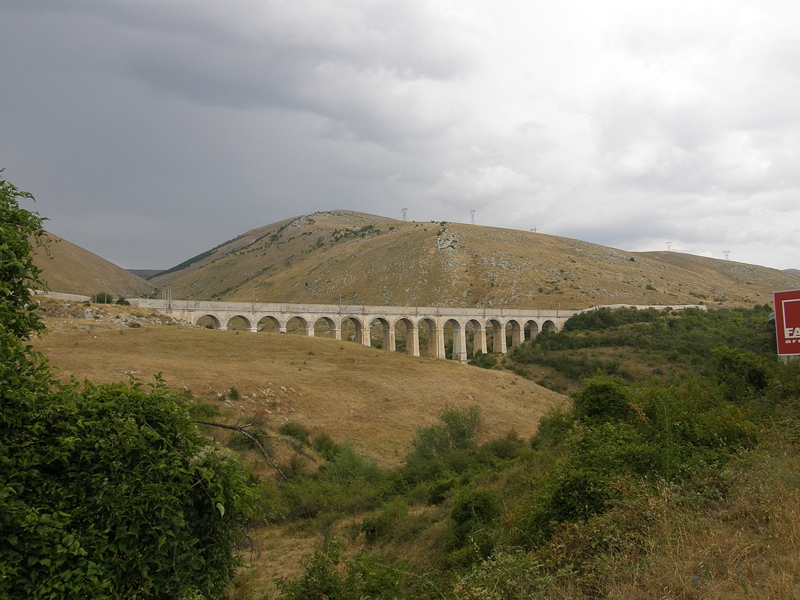

Overview
- Status: in use
- Owner: RFI
- Locale: Italy
- Termini: Roma Tiburtina railway station; Pescara railway station

Service
- Type: Heavy rail
- Operator(s): Trenitalia

History
- Opened: In stages between 1873 and 1888

Technical
- Line length: 240 km (150 mi)
- Number of tracks: Single track
- Track gauge: 1,435 mm (4 ft 8 1/2 in) standard gauge
- Electrification: Electrified at 3000 V DC

The Rome–Pescara railway is an Italian 240-kilometre (150-mile) long railway line, that connects Rome with Tivoli, Avezzano, Sulmona and Pescara. The route operates through the regions of Lazio and Abruzzo.

== History ==
The line was opened in stages between 1873 and 1888.

== Usage ==
The line is used by the following service(s):

- Regional services (Treno regionale) Pescara- Chieti - Sulmona - Avezzano - Tivoli - Rome
- Regional services (Treno regionale) Teramo - Giulianova - Pescara - Chieti - Sulmona - Avezzano
- Regional services (Treno regionale) Avezzano - Tivoli - Rome

== See also ==
- List of railway lines in Italy
