= Assisi railway station =

Railway station in Assisi, Italy

Assisi
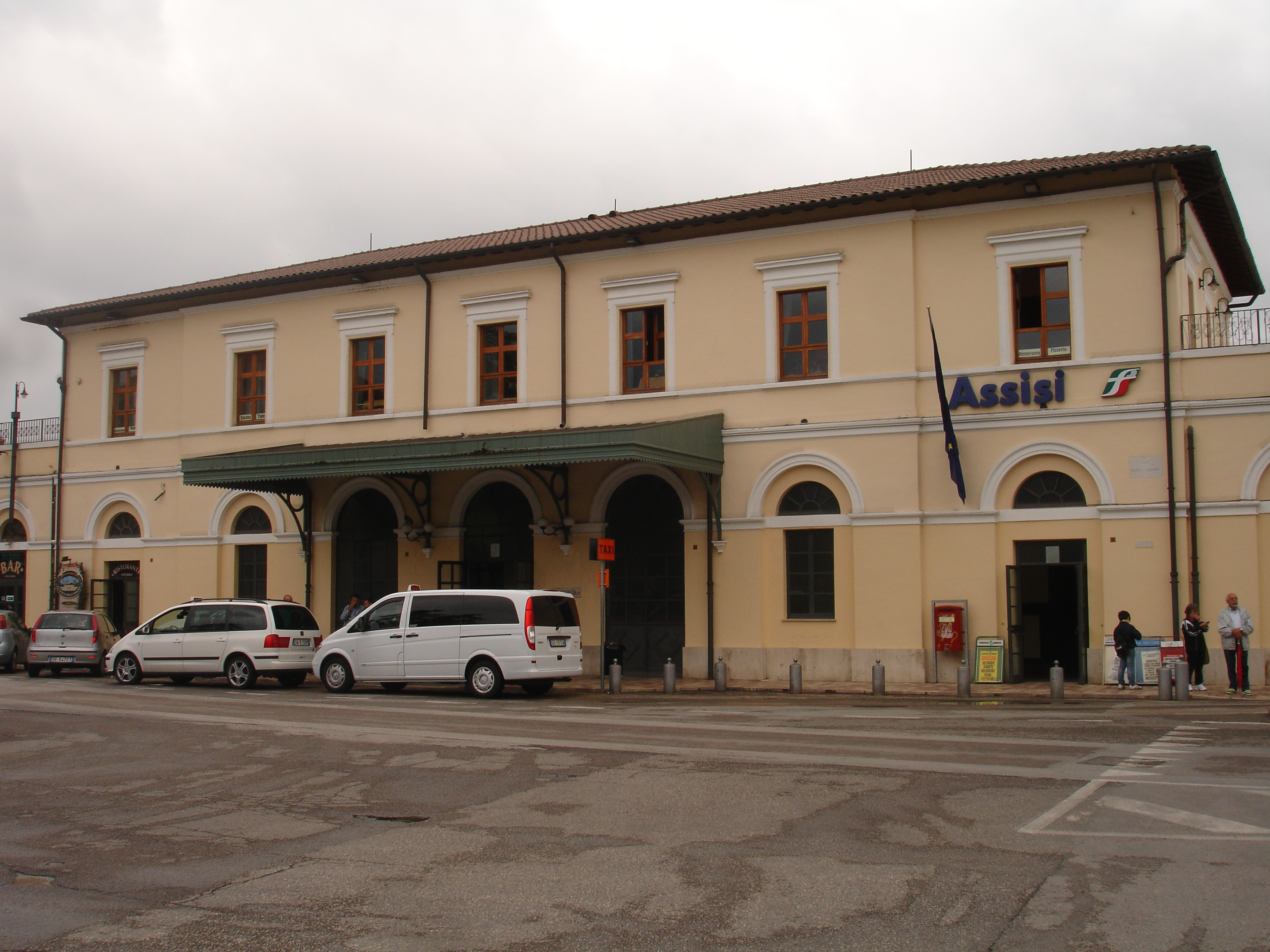

General information
- Location: Piazza Dante Alighieri; 06081 Assisi (Santa Maria degli Angeli) PG; Assisi, Perugia, Umbria; Italy
- Coordinates: 43°03′33″N 12°35′07″E
- Elevation: 222 m (728 ft)
- Operator: Rete Ferroviaria Italiana; Centostazioni
- Line: Foligno–Terontola
- Distance: 15.639 km (9.718 mi) from Foligno
- Platforms: 3
- Train operators: Trenitalia; Ferrovia Centrale Umbra
- Connections: Urban buses

Other information
- Classification: Gold

History
- Opened: 21 July 1866; 160 years ago
Location
- Location within Umbria Location within Italy

Assisi railway station (Italian: Stazione di Assisi) serves the town and comune of Assisi, in the Umbria region, central Italy. Opened in 1866, it forms part of the Foligno–Terontola railway, which also links Florence with Rome.

The station is currently managed by Rete Ferroviaria Italiana (RFI). However, the commercial area of the passenger building is managed by Centostazioni. Train services are operated by or on behalf of Trenitalia. Each of these companies is a subsidiary of Ferrovie dello Stato (FS), Italy's state-owned rail company.

Regional train services calling at the station are operated by Ferrovia Centrale Umbra, which sub-contracts on behalf of Trenitalia.

== Location ==
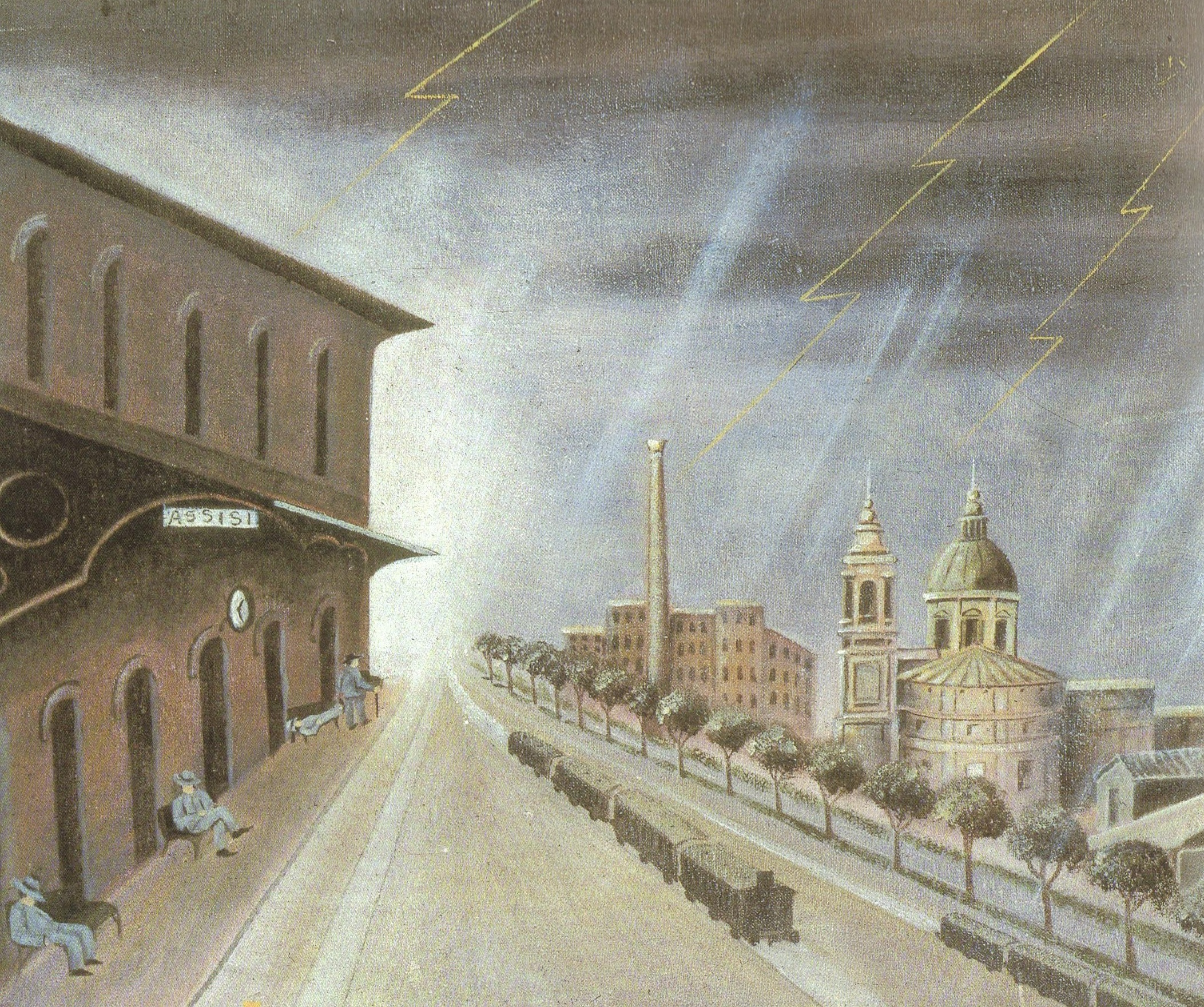
Orneore Metelli, Temporale alla stazione di Assisi (1938).

Assisi railway station is situated at Piazza Dante Alighieri, in the frazione of Santa Maria degli Angeli, about 5 kilometres (3.1 mi) southwest of the city centre.

== History ==
The station was opened on 21 July 1866, upon the inauguration of the Foligno–Collestrada section of the Foligno–Terontola railway.

== Features ==
The passenger building is on two levels, but only the ground floor is accessible to the traveller. The first floor houses some Trenitalia offices. Next to the passenger building is another building, single storey but lengthy. It, too, houses Trenitalia offices. On the other side of the passenger building (originally occupied by a goods yard) there are other small single storey buildings, which house the RFI technical departments.

The station yard consists of three tracks: track 1 is just a single track through line, and the other two tracks are used for overtaking. All tracks are served by platforms connected by an underpass.

Previously, there was a goods yard that has now been dismantled. As at 2010, the yard area was vacant.

== Passenger and train movements ==
The station has about 800,000 passenger movements each year.

Trains are mainly regional rail services, with occasional InterCity trains to Milan, and Eurostar trains to Perugia and Rome. Regional services are operated by Ferrovia Centrale Umbra, which sub-contracts on behalf of Trenitalia. InterCity and long-distance services are operated by Trenitalia itself.

About 54 trains call at the station each day. The main destinations of the regional trains are Rome, Florence, Foligno, Terontola-Cortona, Terni and Perugia.

== Interchange ==
Local bus services link the station with the city centre.

== See also ==
- History of rail transport in Italy
- List of railway stations in Umbria
- Rail transport in Italy
- Railway stations in Italy
