= Terontola–Foligno railway =

Railway line in Italy

Overview
- Status: in use
- Owner: Rete Ferroviaria Italiana
- Line number: 106
- Locale: Umbria, Tuscany, Italy
- Termini: Terontola-Cortona; Foligno

Service
- Type: Heavy rail
- Operator(s): Trenitalia

History
- Opened: 21 July 1866

Technical
- Line length: 82 km (51 mi)
- Number of tracks: 1
- Track gauge: 1,435 mm (4 ft 8 1/2 in) standard gauge
- Electrification: 3 kV DC

The Terontola–Foligno railway is an electrified, standard-gauge Italian railway that connects the Florence–Rome railway in Terontola-Cortona with the Rome–Ancona railway in Foligno, passing through Perugia and Assisi.

== History ==
Section	Opened
Collestrada–Foligno	21 July 1866
Ponte San Giovanni–Collestrada	3 September 1866
Terontola-Cortona–Ellera	14 October 1866
Ellera–Ponte San Giovanni	12 December 1866

The railway was inaugurated in December 1866 as an integral section of the Florence–Foligno line, which was later merged with the Rome–Ancona railway, thus making journeys between Florence and Rome possible; this became more important after the conquest of Rome by Italy in 1870.

In 1875, with the opening of the Terontola–Chiusi section, which shortened the Florence–Rome route by several tens of kilometres, all the trains between these two destinations were diverted to the new railway; the Terontola–Foligno was subsequently relegated to the role of secondary railway.

Starting in 1960, the railway underwent numerous modernisations: it was electrified, the equipment was replaced and the main station squares were rebuilt. However, the branch to Tavernelle (Panicale), which connected to the line at Ellera-Corciano station was closed due to low traffic.

Electric operations on the line commenced at the timetable change of May 1960.

Over time, the line has continued to play the role of connecting the Florence–Rome and the Rome–Ancona lines, frequented mostly by regional trains of various compositions and railcars of the Ferrovia Centrale Umbra, as well as by trains running directly between Perugia and Rome via Foligno. Travel times for the whole line range from 60 to 90 minutes. Doubling of the line was planned in 2011.

== Route ==
The Terontola–Foligno line can be divided into three sections.

The first section, about 25 kilometers long, winds from the junction with the Florence-Rome to the exit from Ellera-Corciano station and is characterised by long straights and very wide curves. It begins in the Tuscan territory with a two-kilometre straight from Terontola station and, after a couple of short tunnels, turns south-east reaching Tuoro station; it continues alongside Lake Trasimeno, following its profile and passing by Montecolognola with the longest tunnel of the line, about 1.3 km long, and reaching Magione; it then runs to Ellera, including a long stretch on an embankment.

The second section, of about 18 km, starts from Ellera and continues to Ponte San Giovanni; it has the steepest grades of the line (around 1.0%) and the narrowest curves (although the curve radiuses are never less than 500 metres). There are also four tunnels and a masonry viaduct with five spans in the San Vetturino area. The railway winds around the Umbrian capital in a sinuous "S", shaped path, called the ansa di Perugia ("loop of Perugia"), which significantly extends travel times. At Ponte San Giovanni, the line crosses the Terni–Perugia–Sansepolcro railway, which runs through the entire Tiber Valley in a north–south direction; a short branch (5.3 km) runs from the same station to Perugia Sant'Anna, near Perugia's historic centre.

The third section, about 28 km long, runs from Ponte San Giovanni to Foligno and is characterised by a totally flat area and an almost straight line, except for some bends near the towns. In this first part of the line, the main structures are a masonry bridge over the Tiber, immediately after Ponte San Giovanni station, a deep cutting in Collestrada, a metal bridge over the Chiascio and a masonry bridge over the Topino. Two stations on this last section of the line (Ospedalicchio and Cannara) have been closed due to a lack of traffic: the first has been disused since 1980, while the second closed in 1995. The facilities of the two stations still exist, but trains have not stopped there for some time.

== Bibliography ==
- RFI, ed. (December 2003). Fascicolo Linea 106 (in Italian). Rete Ferroviaria Italiana.
- Tuzza, Alessandro, ed. (1927). "Prospetto cronologico dei tratti di ferrovia aperti all'esercizio dal 1839 al 31 dicembre 1926" (in Italian). Ufficio Centrale di Statistica delle Ferrovie dello Stato/Trenidicarta.it.
- Atlante ferroviario d'Italia e Slovenia [Railway atlas of Italy and Slovenia] (in Italian). Cologne: Schweers + Wall. 2010. ISBN 978-3-89494-129-1.
