= Terni railway station =

Railway station in Terni, Italy

Terni
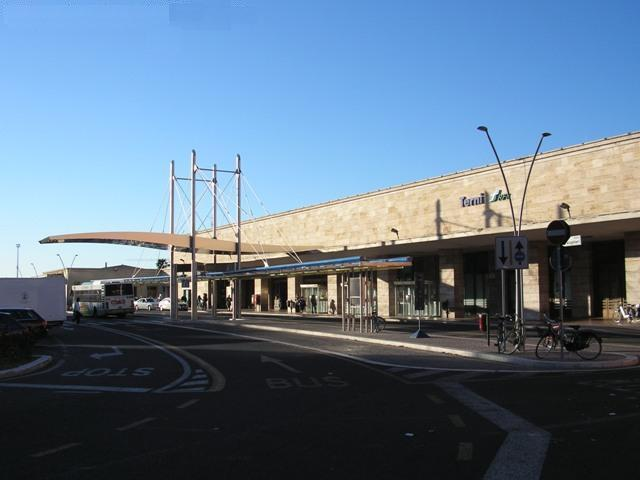
- View of the passenger building.

General information
- Location: Piazza Dante Alighieri; 05100 Terni; Terni, Terni, Umbria; Italy
- Coordinates: 42°34′14″N 12°39′04″E
- Elevation: 129 m (423 ft)
- Operator: Rete Ferroviaria Italiana; Centostazioni
- Lines: Ancona–Orte; Terni–Sulmona; Terni–Sansepolcro
- Distance: 111.479 km (69.270 mi) from Roma Termini
- Platforms: 6
- Train operators: Trenitalia; Ferrovia Centrale Umbra
- Connections: Urban and suburban buses

Other information
- Classification: Gold

History
- Opened: 4 January 1866; 160 years ago
Location
- Location within Umbria Location within Italy

Terni railway station (Italian: Stazione di Terni) serves the town and comune of Terni, in the region of Umbria, central Italy. Opened in 1866, it forms part of the Ancona–Orte railway, and is also a junction station for two secondary lines, the Terni–Sulmona railway and the Terni–Sansepolcro railway.

The station is currently managed by Rete Ferroviaria Italiana (RFI). However, the commercial area of the passenger building is managed by Centostazioni. Train services are operated by or on behalf of Trenitalia. Each of these companies is a subsidiary of Ferrovie dello Stato (FS), Italy's state-owned rail company.

Regional train services on the Terni–Sansepolcro railway are operated by Ferrovia Centrale Umbra, which sub-contracts on behalf of Trenitalia.

== Location ==
Terni railway station is situated at Piazza Dante Alighieri, at the northern end of the city centre.

== History ==
The station was opened on 4 January 1866, upon the inauguration of the Foligno–Terni and Terni–Orte sections of the Rome–Ancona railway. On 30 October 1883, Terni was transformed into a junction station, with the opening of the final, Terni–Rocca di Corno, section of the Terni–Sulmona railway. Many years later, on 15 July 1915, Terni became the terminus of another secondary line, when the Umbertide–Terni section of the Terni–Sansepolcro railway was opened.

== Features ==
The passenger building is currently being renovated, both inside (thanks to the Centostazioni program) and outside. The renovations include the construction of a terminal for suburban buses, a modern shelter for city buses, and the expansion of the parking lot. These measures will substantially upgrade interchange between rail and urban transport.

Inside the passenger building are also other facilities such as toilets, ticket offices, waiting rooms, a newsstand, a tobacconist, restaurant and chapel. In addition, there are offices for the management of rail traffic, and an office of the Railway Police.

The station yard has five passenger service through tracks. Many other tracks serve goods traffic and for storage of rolling stock. The passenger tracks are equipped with platforms topped by shelters, and the platforms are connected via an underpass.

== Train services ==
The station has about 2.3 million passenger movements each year.

The trains stopping at the station range from regional services to InterCity, Eurostar and high speed trains.

Regional services on the Terni–Sansepolcro railway are operated by Ferrovia Centrale Umbra, which sub-contracts on behalf of Trenitalia. All other train services are operated by Trenitalia itself.

== Interchange ==
The station is the terminus of all ATC urban and suburban bus services. It also has a special parking area for taxis.

== See also ==
- History of rail transport in Italy
- List of railway stations in Umbria
- Rail transport in Italy
- Railway stations in Italy
