= List of railway stations in Umbria =

This is the list of the railway stations in Umbria owned by Rete Ferroviaria Italiana, a branch of the Italian state company Ferrovie dello Stato.

== List ==
Station	Locality	Province	Category
Allerona-Castel Viscardo	Allerona	Terni	Bronze
Alviano	Alviano	Terni	Bronze
Assisi	Assisi	Perugia	Gold
Attigliano-Bomarzo	Attigliano	Terni	Silver
Baiano di Spoleto	Baiano	Perugia	Bronze
Bastia Umbra	Bastia Umbra	Perugia	Silver
Campello sul Clitunno	Campello sul Clitunno	Perugia	Bronze
Castiglione del Lago	Castiglione del Lago	Perugia	Silver
Ellera-Corciano	Ellera	Perugia	Bronze
Fabro-Ficulle	Fabro	Terni	Silver
Foligno	Foligno	Perugia	Gold
Fossato di Vico-Gubbio	Fossato di Vico	Perugia	Silver
Gaifana	Gaifana	Perugia	Bronze
Giuncano	Giuncano	Terni	Bronze
Gualdo Tadino	Gualdo Tadino	Perugia	Bronze
Magione	Magione	Perugia	Bronze
Marmore	Marmore	Terni	Bronze
Narni-Amelia	Narni	Terni	Silver
Nera Montoro	Nera Montoro	Terni	Bronze
Nocera Umbra	Nocera Umbra	Perugia	Bronze
Orvieto	Orvieto	Terni	Silver
Passignano sul Trasimeno	Passignano sul Trasimeno	Perugia	Silver
Perugia	Perugia	Perugia	Gold
Perugia Ponte San Giovanni	Perugia	Perugia	Silver
Perugia Silvestrini	Perugia	Perugia	Bronze
Perugia Università	Perugia	Perugia	Bronze
San Giacomo di Spoleto	San Giacomo	Perugia	Bronze
San Liberato	San Liberato	Terni	Bronze
Scanzano-Belfiore	Scanzano	Perugia	Bronze
Spello	Spello	Perugia	Bronze
Spoleto	Spoleto	Perugia	Silver
Terni	Terni	Terni	Gold
Terni Cospea	Terni	Terni	Bronze
Torricella	Torricella	Perugia	Bronze
Trevi	Trevi	Perugia	Bronze
Tuoro sul Trasimeno	Tuoro sul Trasimeno	Perugia	Bronze
Valtopina	Valtopina	Perugia	Bronze

== See also ==
- Railway stations in Italy
- Ferrovie dello Stato
- Rail transport in Italy
- High-speed rail in Italy
- Transport in Italy
