= Centro Direzionale di Fontivegge =

Building in Perugia, Italy

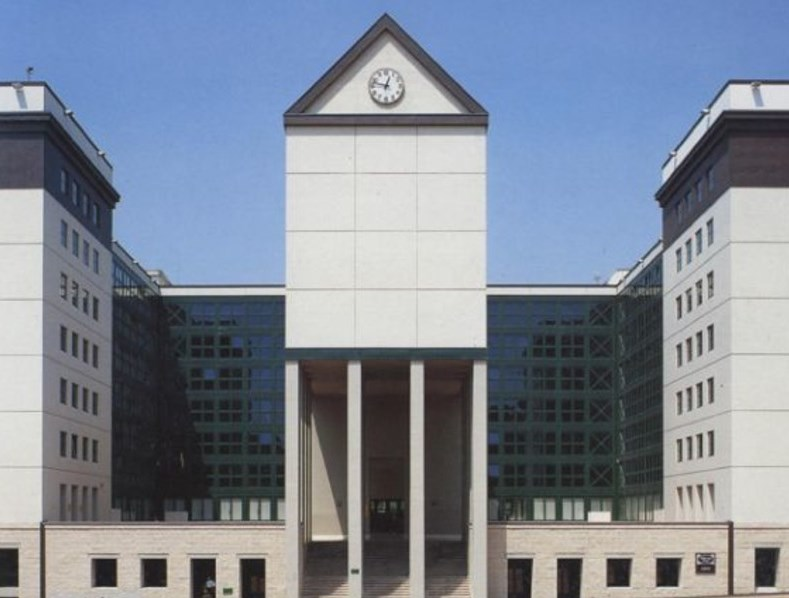
- Interactive map of the Centro Direzionale di Fontivegge area

General information
- Status: In use
- Architectural style: Post-Modern
- Location: Perugia
- Construction started: 1983

Design and construction
- Architect: Aldo Rossi

The Centro Direzionale di Fontivegge is a modern complex of public, commercial and residential buildings of Perugia, Italy. It is located in Piazza Nuova, in the neighbourhood of the railway station of Fontivegge.

== Background ==
In the Fontivegge neighborhood, near the railway station, there is a complex of postmodern buildings, with the Centro Direzionale della regione Umbria (management centre of the Umbria region). It is also called “Broletto”, because it has the function of a public palace, as the Lombard Arengo (a place dedicated to the meeting of the citizens). It was designed in 1983 by the internationally renowned architect and designer Aldo Rossi to substitute another huge project of 1980, greater in volume, never realized because too expensive.

The management wanted it to modernize the area that was previously occupied by the buildings, then in decay as abandoned after the moving of the chocolate factory in the outskirts of the city, of the Perugina. The old smokestack of the factory was kept in the project as an example of industrial archaeology.

== Description ==
In the centre of the architectural complex, a big square paved with bricks and stones follows the natural slope of the land. At the centre of the square, like in many cities of Umbria, there is a fountain, with monolithic and straight lines. The square originally was called “Piazza del Bacio” in memory of the famous chocolate candy, later it was called “Piazza Nuova” because it gave a new face to this neighborhood. The stairway, visible from the railway station, allows access to this new Agorà, a metaphysical space like those depicted by de Chirico. On the left between two Rationalist blocks, a big tall building with the appearance of a temple, in front of which one feels almost crushed. The facade is composed of a stairway to the base, a very high and long colonnade which has on top a parallelepiped with squares and, above, a gable with a clock.

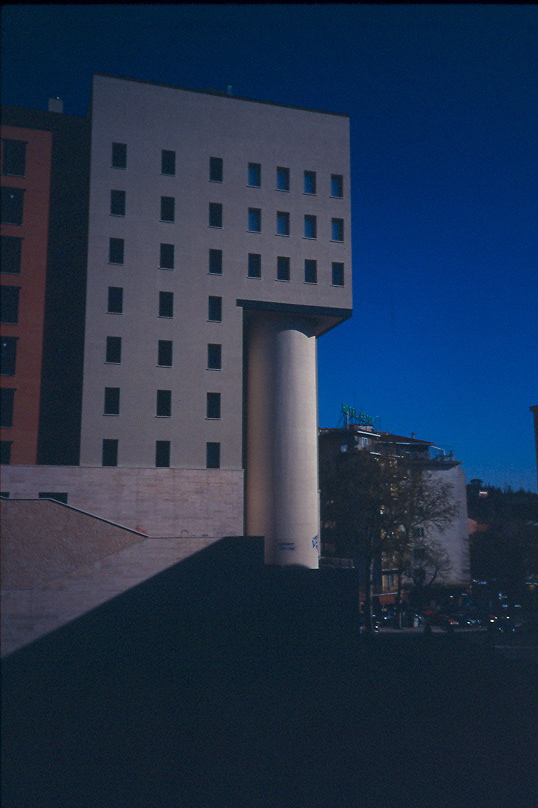
South-east Corner of Piazza Nuova

On the right side of the square, a building with arcades and commercial activities on the lower floors and residential ones on the upper floors; the building has a huge column in the corner (see the photo).

To the south of the square, another big building which was a shopping mall.

Notwithstanding the fact that the project follows architectural models different from the environmental context, it adopts the same construction material of the cities of Umbria: travertine and bricks. There was particular attention to the integration of the building in the urban context connecting it with the new buildings by means of bridges and underpass designed with light and natural ventilation. A bridge crosses Viale Angeloni connecting the square with the other part of the avenue. Another bridge near the smokestack connects the square and the street to Villa Buitoni, located on the slope to the west.

== Projects of the Theatre and the Exhibition Centre ==
In the original project, to the north side, a conical theatre was imagined, small in size, but intended as the centre of the square and the neighborhood. At the back of the theatre another public space was meant to be built, intended as an exhibition centre. The project, not finished yet, should create a new urban pole where public, commercial and residential buildings, around the square, can integrate themselves. In its place now a little green space with a metallic sculpture which represents the bust of Aldo Capitini.

== The Smokestack ==
The structure made of bricks and iron can be dated back to the early 20th century, it is an example of industrial archaeology left “where and as it was”. It is one of the smokestacks of the old chocolate factory, Perugina, which at that time was the main manufacturing activity of Perugia. The factory was opened in 1915 (the year in which the production of cocoa started) and in 1965 was moved to a new location (San Sisto). The geometric conical shape of smokestack will be used also in the project of the theatre.

== Bibliography ==
- Paolo Belardi, NAU-Novecento Architettura Umbria, ediz. Il Formichiere Foligno 2014
