= Perugia railway station =

Railway station in Perugia, Umbria, Italy

Perugia
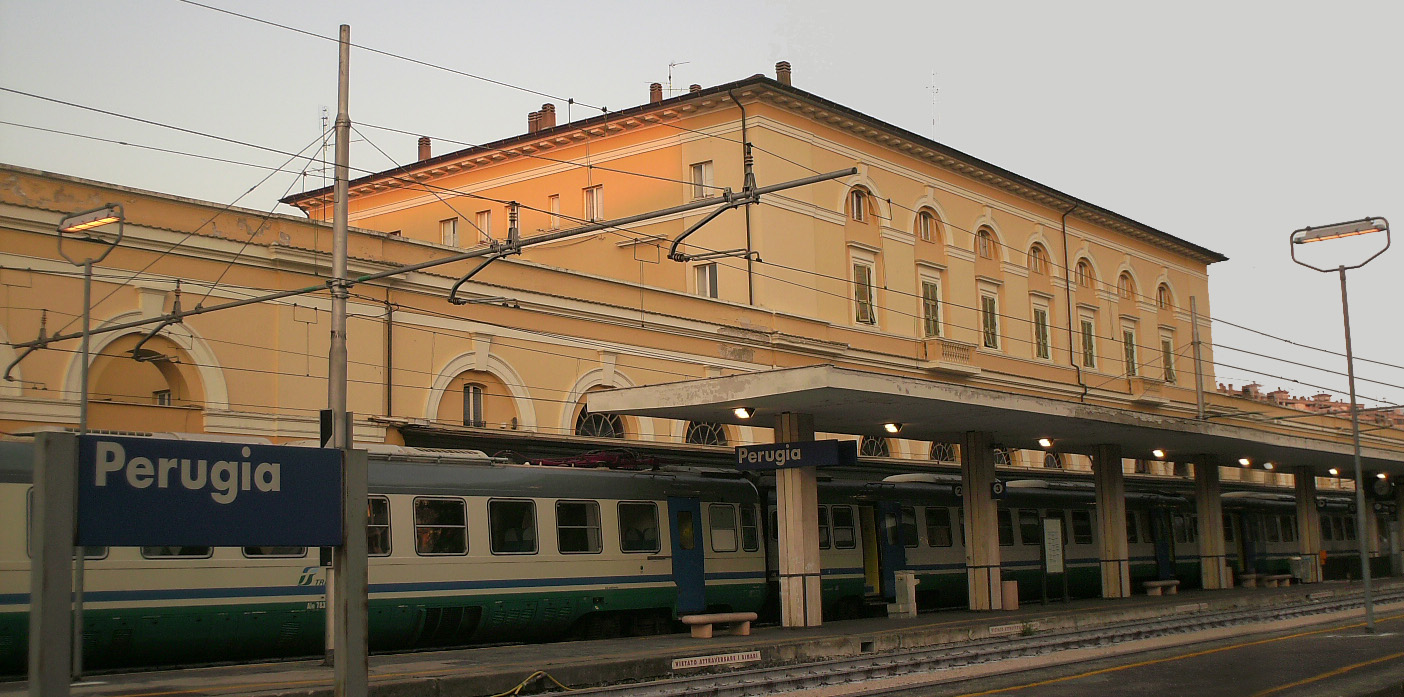
- View of the passenger building.

General information
- Location: Piazza Vittorio Veneto; 06124 Perugia PG; Perugia, Perugia, Umbria; Italy
- Coordinates: 43°06′14″N 12°22′32″E
- Elevation: 304 m (997 ft)
- Operator: Rete Ferroviaria Italiana; Centostazioni
- Line: Foligno–Terontola
- Distance: 39.580 km (24.594 mi) from Foligno
- Train operators: Trenitalia; Ferrovia Centrale Umbra
- Connections: Minimetrò; Urban and suburban buses

Other information
- Classification: Gold

History
- Opened: 12 December 1866; 159 years ago
Location
- Location within Umbria Location within Italy

Perugia railway station, also known as Perugia Fontivegge railway station (Italian: Stazione di Perugia; Stazione di Perugia Fontivegge) is the main station serving the city and comune of Perugia, in the region of Umbria, central Italy. Opened in 1866, it forms part of the Foligno–Terontola railway, which also links Florence with Rome.

The station is currently managed by Rete Ferroviaria Italiana (RFI). The commercial area of the passenger building is managed by Centostazioni. Train services are operated by or on behalf of Trenitalia. Each of these companies is a subsidiary of Ferrovie dello Stato (FS), Italy's state-owned rail company.

Regional train services calling at the station are operated by Ferrovia Centrale Umbra, which sub-contracts on behalf of Trenitalia.

== Location ==
Perugia railway station is situated at Piazza Vittorio Veneto, in the heavily populated district of Fontivegge, about 3 kilometres (1.9 mi) southwest of the city centre.

== History ==
The station was opened on 12 December 1866, upon the inauguration of the Ellera Corciano–Ponte San Giovanni section of the Foligno–Terontola railway.

== Features ==
=== Buildings ===
The passenger building is a large structure built on three levels. Only the ground floor is accessible to travellers, through a main entrance below three large arches. Adjacent to the main building are two other buildings arranged symmetrically on a single plane.

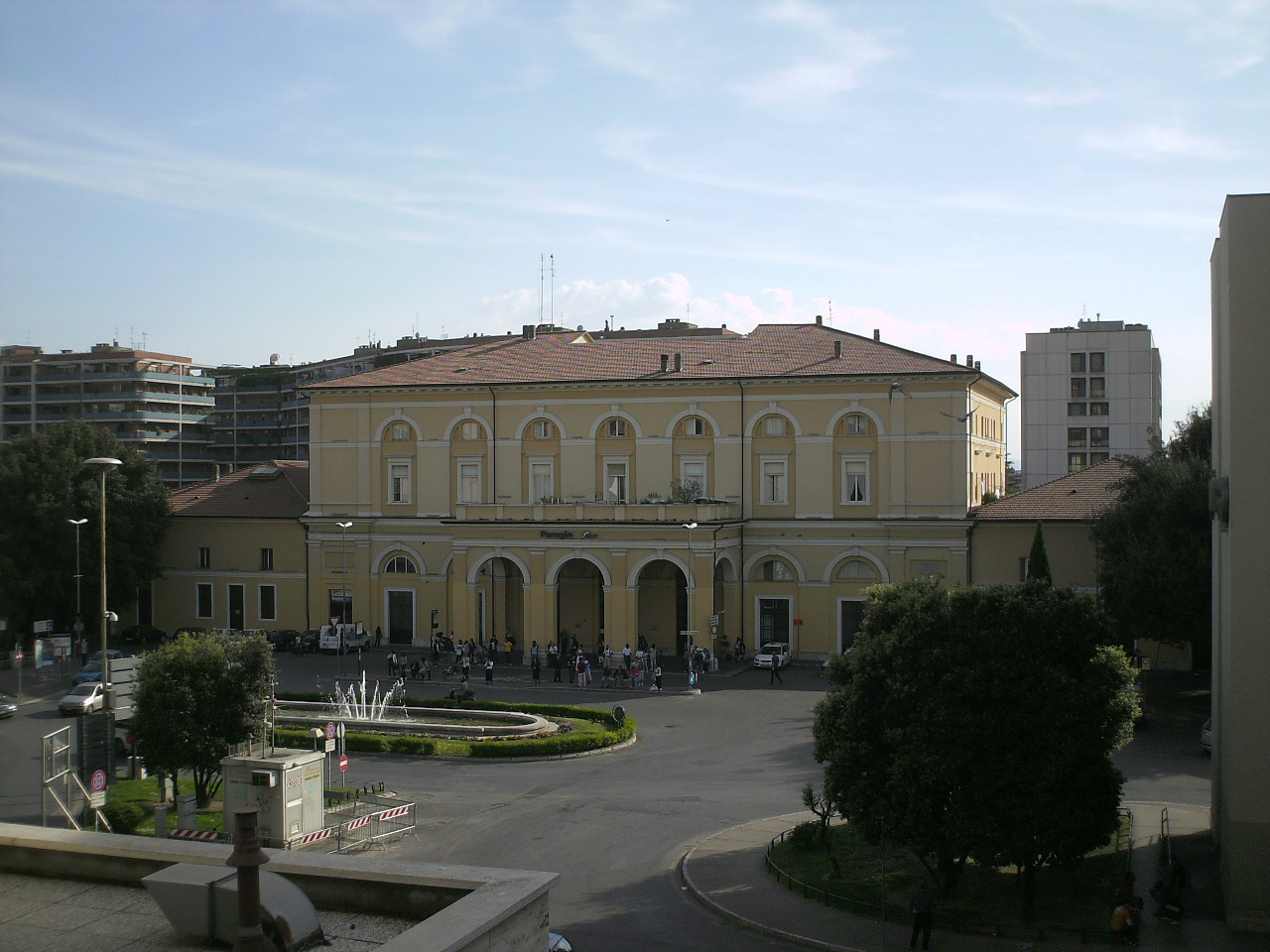
The Piazza and passenger building.

Inside the entrance to the passenger building is a ticket office. This room is very large. In its middle are four substantial columns, supporting a high ceiling. Dividing the ticket hall from the station yard are three blue and green glass doors.

The waiting room is also very large. It has beautiful wooden benches, which, although antique, are still in very good condition.

Passengers inside the building can also admire a sculpture from Roman times in honor of the sacrifice of Perugia in the war against Hannibal. Above the sculpture are modern style mosaic pictorial maps of Umbria and Perugia.

Extending from the passenger building are several small buildings, including a modern building housing the RFI technical offices.

On the opposite side of the station yard from the passenger building is what remains of the now disused goods yard; it has a brick warehouse very similar in style to its counterparts at other Italian stations.

=== Station yard ===
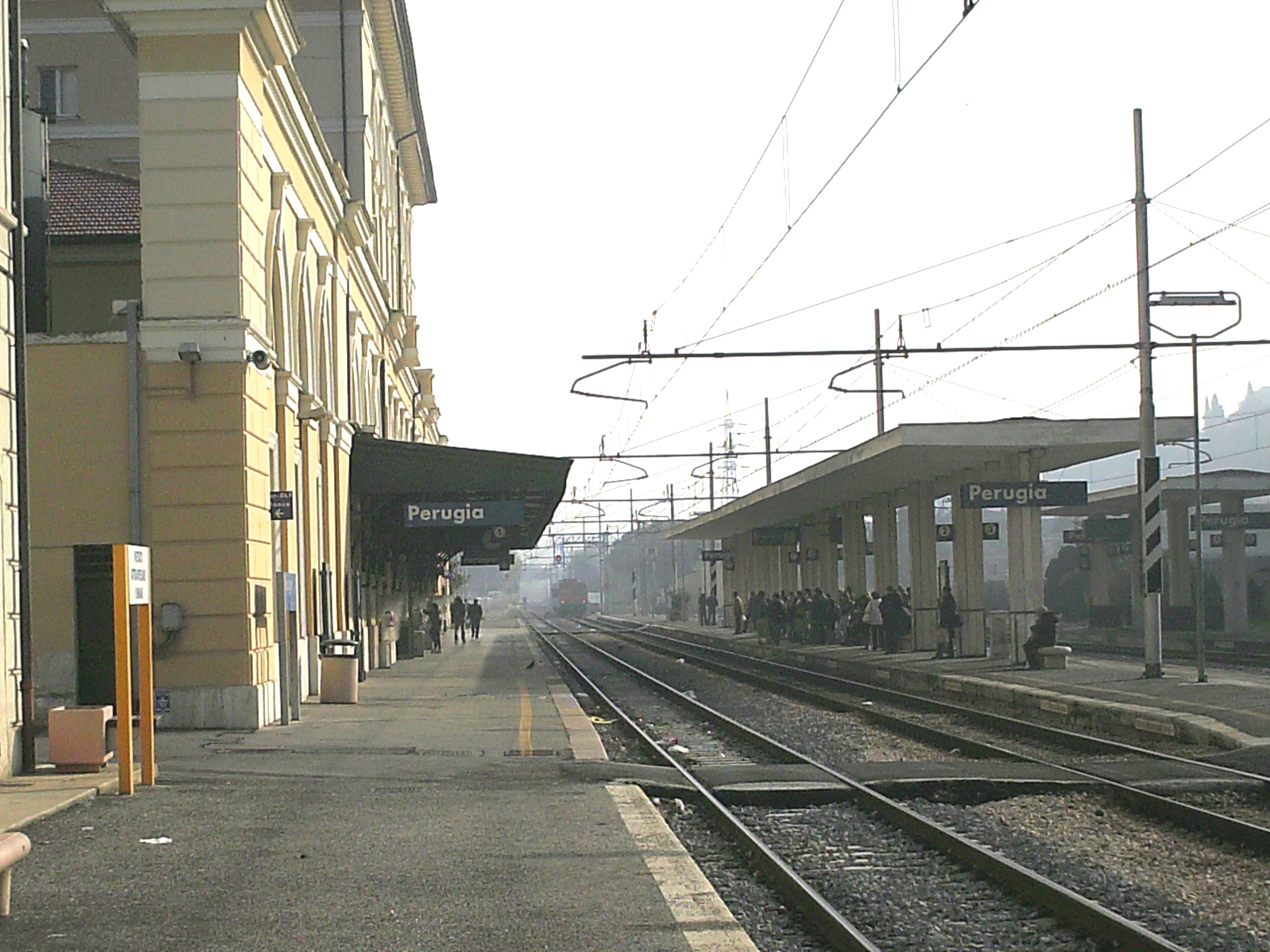
View of the main platform.

The station yard has four through tracks. Only the second track is used for through trains stopping at the station. All of the others are used for overtaking, or for originating or terminating trains.

Each of the tracks is equipped with a platform and most have a concrete shelter. The one exception is covered instead by a wrought iron canopy. On all platforms, there are light panels displaying the destination, type and time of departure of the train that is stopped or will be stopping at that platform. All platforms are connected by an underpass.

Until recently there was also a fifth track, but this was dismantled because it was little used.

In the former goods yard there are some free tracks and an electrification dock, all of which serve today for the storage of disused or out of service carriages and line maintenance equipment.

== Passenger and train movements ==
The station has about three million passenger movements each year.

Passenger trains are mainly regional rail services, with occasional InterCity trains to Milan and Eurostar trains. Regional services are operated by Ferrovia Centrale Umbra, which sub-contracts on behalf of Trenitalia. InterCity and long-distance services are operated by Trenitalia itself.

About 50 trains call at the station each day. Their main destinations are Firenze Santa Maria Novella, Terontola-Cortona, Foligno and Roma Termini.

Goods services have long since ceased.

== Interchange ==
The station has several underground car parks, a bus station and, about 100 metres (330 ft) along a path, a stop for the new Perugia Minimetrò.

== See also ==
- History of rail transport in Italy
- List of railway stations in Umbria
- Rail transport in Italy
- Railway stations in Italy
