= Serse Cosmi =

Italian football manager (born 1958)

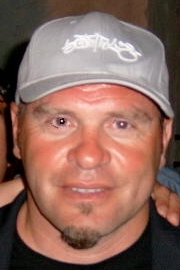

Personal information
- Date of birth: 5 May 1958 (age 68)
- Place of birth: Ponte San Giovanni, Italy
- Height: 1.75 m (5 ft 9 in)
- Position: Defender

Managerial career
- Years: Team
- 1990–1995: Pontevecchio
- 1995–2000: Arezzo
- 2000–2004: Perugia
- 2004–2005: Genoa
- 2005–2006: Udinese
- 2007–2008: Brescia
- 2009–2010: Livorno
- 2010: Livorno
- 2011: Palermo
- 2011–2012: Lecce
- 2012: Siena
- 2014: Pescara
- 2015–2016: Trapani
- 2017–2018: Ascoli
- 2019: Venezia
- 2020: Perugia
- 2021: Crotone
- 2022: Rijeka
- 2026–: Salernitana

Serse Cosmi (born 5 May 1958) is an Italian football coach, in charge of Salernitana.

== Career ==
=== Early career ===
Cosmi was born in 1958 in Ponte San Giovanni, a Perugia frazione. His father, a cycling fan, called him Serse after Fausto Coppi's brother, a cyclist himself, who died following a fall during a sprint. He worked for nine years as primary school teacher, and played amateur football during his free time for local teams such as Deruta, Cannara, Spello and Pontevecchio, in the role of midfielder.

He started a coaching career in the late 1980s in Ellera, as under-18 youth team coach. His debut as first team coach came in 1990, when he was appointed to coach Pontevecchio, a small amateur team from his native town of Ponte San Giovanni. Cosmi brought it on from the Prima Categoria (fourth level of amateur leagues in Italy) to Serie D (the top one) in just five years. Successively, he joined Arezzo, which he led from Serie D to Serie C1 in five extremely positive years. In 2000, Cosmi received the highest possible mark in the Coverciano coaching course; his thesis was entitled "Il Trequartista" ("the advanced playmaker," in Italian football jargon).

=== Perugia ===
In 2000, after being noted by Luciano Gaucci, Cosmi was surprisingly appointed as head coach of Perugia in Serie A. He guided the team for four consecutive years, winning a UEFA Intertoto Cup, showing valid coaching abilities and launching several players, including 2006 FIFA World Cup winner Marco Materazzi (who reached a career high of 12 goals in a single season under Cosmi's tenure), Fabrizio Miccoli, Fabio Grosso and Fabio Liverani. Cosmi's period at Perugia would last four years, during which he led the fringe Umbrian club to victory in the 2003 UEFA Intertoto Cup.

=== Genoa and Udinese ===
In 2004, Cosmi left Perugia, after the team went relegated at the end of the season, and joined Genoa of Serie B, with the clear goal to bring the rossoblu back to Serie A.

At the end of the 2004–05 season, Cosmi managed to win the league and guide his team to Serie A, but he subsequently left because of disagreements with club chairman Enrico Preziosi, before Genoa itself was relegated to Serie C1 due to match-fixing.

After his short but successful experience with Genoa, Cosmi was signed as the new coach of Udinese, in order to replace Luciano Spalletti, who gained the qualification to the preliminary rounds of Champions' League the previous season. But it was Cosmi who led the team on the European competition, defeating Sporting CP in a two-tier qualifying round.

However, after a disappointing series of results, including elimination from the Champions League and Serie A results much below expectations, Cosmi was finally fired on 10 February 2006.

=== Brescia and Livorno ===
On 28 February 2007, he was appointed head coach of Serie B club Brescia. On his very first match after replacing Mario Somma, Cosmi led Brescia to an astonishing 3–1 result against Serie B leaders Juventus. He was fired in September 2008 due to poor results to make room for a new boss, Nedo Sonetti.

On 20 October 2009, Cosmi made a Serie A comeback as new head coach of bottom-placed relegation battlers Livorno. In his first game in charge, he guided Livorno to a surprising 1–0 away win against Roma, which was immediately followed by a second consecutive 1–0 win, against Atalanta, only three days later.

Despite fairly good results at the helm of Livorno, Cosmi resigned from his coaching post on 24 January 2010, in the wake of a 2–0 home loss to fourth-placed Napoli due to disagreements with club chairman Aldo Spinelli. Two days later, on 26 January, Cosmi and Spinelli met each other in attempt to clarify each other, also following the supporter fanbase's criticism of the way Spinelli handled the issue. Following the meeting, both parties agreed that the head coach's resignation offer would have been rejected and Cosmi would return at Livorno with immediate effect. This, however, lasted only a few more weeks, and Cosmi was dismissed later on April following a string of negative results that left Livorno down at the bottom of the table.

=== Palermo ===
After more than a year without a job, Cosmi returned into management on 28 February 2011, taking over coaching duties at Palermo as a replacement for Delio Rossi, who was dismissed from the Sicilian club following a record 0–7 home defeat to Udinese. At Palermo, Cosmi reunited with former players Fabrizio Miccoli and Fabio Liverani, as well as ex-player and team staff member Giovanni Tedesco.

After three losses and one victory against A.C. Milan, Serse Cosmi was released by club president Zamparini after a disappointing 4–0 loss to Catania.

=== Lecce ===
On 4 December 2011, Cosmi was unveiled as the new head coach of bottom-placed Serie A side Lecce, replacing Eusebio Di Francesco.

=== Later career ===
On 27 June 2012, Cosmi was appointed the new coach of Siena in Serie A on a two-year contract; but, on 17 December, he was sacked.

On 24 February 2014, Cosmi returned into management as the new head coach of Serie B club Pescara, replacing Pasquale Marino, but he failed to turn the team's fortunes and they missed out qualification for the promotion playoffs. He left the club at the end of the season.

On 11 March 2015, he was named manager of Serie B side Trapani, replacing long-serving Roberto Boscaglia. Cosmi led Trapani to the 2016 Serie B promotion playoffs, where they were defeated by Pescara in the final round. He was sacked by Trapani on 28 November 2016, after obtaining only 11 points from the first 16 rounds of the season, and after his car was set on fire by the club's supporters.

On 7 December 2017, Cosmi was named as the replacement for Fulvio Fiorin at Serie B side, Ascoli. He was replaced by Vincenzo Vivarini on 12 July 2018.

On 6 March 2019, Cosmi was appointed as manager of Venezia.

On 4 January 2020, Cosmi returned to Perugia after 16 years, replacing Massimo Oddo. He signed a contract until 30 June.

Cosmi was appointed as manager of Crotone on 1 March 2021, following the sacking of Giovanni Stroppa, signing a contract until the end of the season. After failing to save his team from relegation to Serie B, with Crotone ending the season in 19th place in the league, the club announced that they would not retain Cosmi for the following season.

On 4 September 2022, Cosmi returned into management as the new head coach of Croatian club Rijeka. However, his experience at the club proved to be short-lived, as he was dismissed on 13 November 2022 following a 2–7 loss to Dinamo Zagreb.

On 24 February 2026, Cosmi returned to management after almost four years, taking over as the new head coach of Italian Serie C club Salernitana.

== Style of management ==
"With his trademark cap and his little goatee beard, Serse Cosmi is one of Italian football's most recognisable figures. His touchline energy and excitable gestures make him a popular butt of jokes by Italian comedians, too. His provincial accent is often impenetrable for those unfamiliar with the brogue of Perugia. Cosmi is an eccentric goblin of a man, but a wily coach who is greatly liked by fans"."

— The National

Cosmi is widely popular in Italy for his energetic and excitable behaviour during matches. He is also known for his intelligence and mentality as a manager, as well as his strong character and ability to motivate his players. He is also famous for always wearing a baseball cap (usually that of his team, but often with just his signature printed on it).'

Tactically, Cosmi's favoured formation is a fluid 3–5–2, which defensively becomes a 5–3–2 when his team are not in possession of the ball, and occasionally a 3–4–1–2 when attacking. He gave his forwards a lot of freedom to move around the attacking third.

Throughout his career, Cosmi's team often featured Mario Palazzi as his assistant coach, whom he met during their studies at the Coverciano technical centre, as well as athletic coach Francesco Bulletti, and Fabio Bazzani as a second assistant coach, who often specialised in tactics. Cosmi's distinctive style has been imitated by comedian Maurizio Crozza.

== Managerial statistics ==
As of match played 13 November 2022

Managerial record by team and tenure
Team	Nat	From	To	Record							
Team	Nat	From	To	G	W	D	L	GF	GA	GD	Win %
Pontevecchio	(Italy)	1 July 1990	22 May 1995	162	70	61	31	222	146	+76	43.21
Arezzo	(Italy)	22 May 1995	13 June 2000	198	77	71	50	233	194	+39	38.89
Perugia	(Italy)	13 June 2000	23 June 2004	172	56	54	62	219	238	−19	32.56
Genoa	(Italy)	23 June 2004	21 June 2005	45	20	20	5	79	50	+29	44.44
Udinese	(Italy)	23 June 2005	10 February 2006	36	12	8	16	44	54	−10	33.33
Brescia	(Italy)	28 February 2007	25 September 2008	70	35	16	19	98	70	+28	50.00
Livorno	(Italy)	21 October 2009	24 January 2010	15	7	0	8	13	21	−8	46.67
Livorno	(Italy)	26 January 2010	5 April 2010	11	0	5	6	9	19	−10	0.00
Palermo	(Italy)	28 February 2011	3 April 2011	4	1	0	3	1	7	−6	25.00
Lecce	(Italy)	4 December 2011	24 June 2012	25	6	10	9	29	33	−4	24.00
Siena	(Italy)	27 June 2012	17 December 2012	19	6	5	8	22	26	−4	31.58
Pescara	(Italy)	24 February 2014	28 June 2014	16	4	6	6	16	20	−4	25.00
Trapani	(Italy)	11 March 2015	28 November 2016	78	30	27	21	99	91	+8	38.46
Ascoli	(Italy)	7 December 2017	12 July 2018	27	8	10	9	25	32	−7	29.63
Venezia	(Italy)	5 March 2019	30 June 2019	13	3	6	4	14	18	−4	23.08
Perugia	(Italy)	4 January 2020	19 July 2020	17	4	3	10	10	21	−11	23.53
Crotone	(Italy)	1 March 2021	31 May 2021	14	3	2	9	22	35	−13	21.43
Rijeka	(Croatia)	4 September 2022	13 November 2022	12	4	1	7	18	23	−5	33.33
Total				934	346	305	283	1,173	1,088	+85	37.04

== Honours ==
=== Managerial ===
Perugia

- UEFA Intertoto Cup: 2003

== See also ==
- List of UEFA Intertoto Cup winning managers
