= List of UEFA Intertoto Cup winning managers =

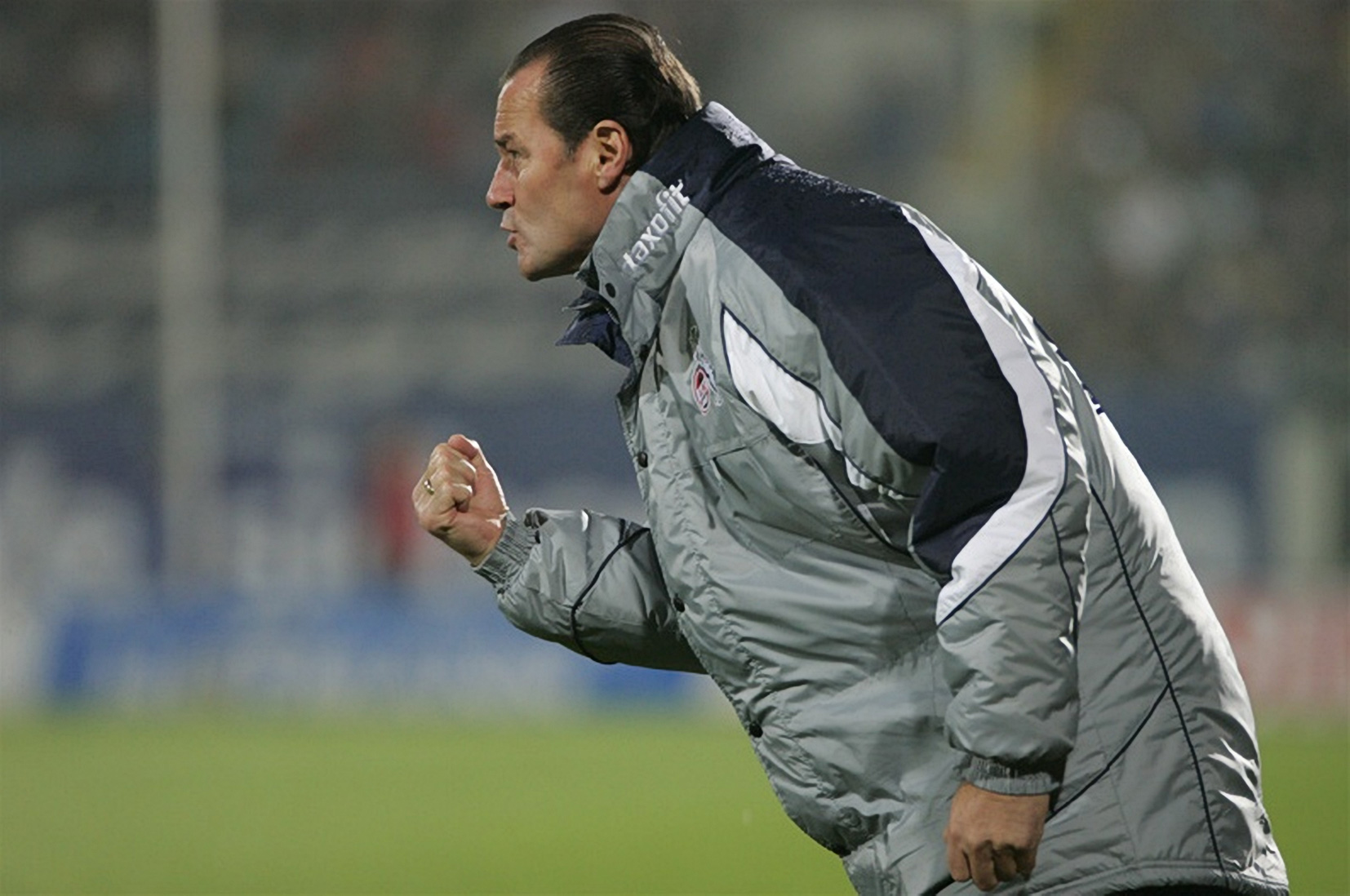
Huub Stevens, winning manager in 2007

The UEFA Intertoto Cup was a European association football competition, held during the summer for the leading European clubs that have failed to qualify for either the UEFA Champions League or the UEFA Cup. It provided "an alternative qualifying route into the UEFA Cup". The tournament did not come under official UEFA sanction until 1995, and was abolished in 2009.

The first tournament provided two winners, both of whom therefore qualified for the UEFA Cup in the 1995–96 season, with Frenchman Jacky Duguépéroux and Yugoslavian Slavoljub Muslin as the winning managers. From the following season to the 2005 contest, three teams were awarded Intertoto Cups, with French managers being the most successful. In 2006, the format was modified to allow eleven clubs to qualify for the second qualifying round of the UEFA Cup, the Intertoto Cup being awarded to the team that progressed the furthest in the competition. Englishman Glenn Roeder lifted the cup that season as he guided Newcastle United to the last 16 of the 2006–07 UEFA Cup. German Jupp Heynckes is the only man to have won the cup twice and did so in consecutive years (2003 and 2004) with German club Schalke 04.

== By year ==
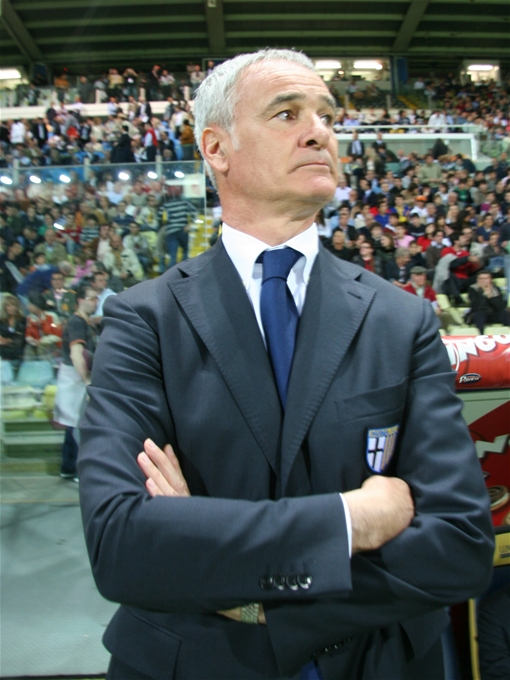
Claudio Ranieri, winning manager in 1998

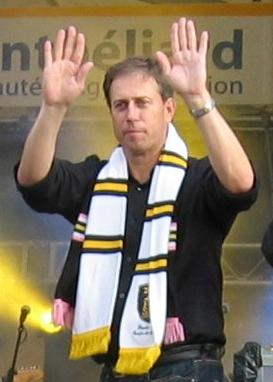
Alain Perrin, winning manager in 2001

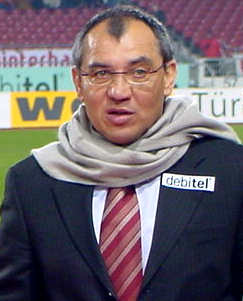
Felix Magath, winning manager in 2002

Final	Nationality	Winning manager	Nation	Club	Ref
1995	France	Jacky Duguépéroux	France	Strasbourg	
1995	FR Yugoslavia	Slavoljub Muslin	France	Bordeaux	
1996	Germany	Winfried Schäfer	Germany	Karlsruher SC	
1996	France	Francis Smerecki	France	Guingamp	
1996	Denmark	Preben Elkjær	Denmark	Silkeborg	
1997	France	Frédéric Antonetti	France	Bastia	
1997	France	Bernard Lacombe	France	Lyon	
1997	France	Guy Roux	France	Auxerre	
1998	Germany	Wolfgang Sidka	Germany	Werder Bremen	
1998	Italy	Claudio Ranieri	Spain	Valencia	
1998	Italy	Carlo Mazzone	Italy	Bologna	
1999	France	Jean-Louis Gasset	France	Montpellier	
1999	Italy	Carlo Ancelotti	Italy	Juventus	
1999	England	Harry Redknapp	England	West Ham United	
2000	Germany	Ralf Rangnick	Germany	Stuttgart	
2000	Italy	Luigi De Canio	Italy	Udinese	
2000	Spain	Víctor Fernández	Spain	Celta Vigo	
2001	England	John Gregory	England	Aston Villa	
2001	France	Luis Fernández	France	Paris Saint-Germain	
2001	France	Alain Perrin	France	Troyes	
2002	Spain	Joaquín Peiró	Spain	Málaga	
2002	France	Jean Tigana	England	Fulham	
2002	Germany	Felix Magath	Germany	Stuttgart	
2003	Germany	Jupp Heynckes	Germany	Schalke 04	
2003	Italy	Serse Cosmi	Italy	Perugia	
2003	Spain	Benito Floro	Spain	Villarreal	
2004	Germany	Jupp Heynckes	Germany	Schalke 04	
2004	France	Claude Puel	France	Lille	
2004	Chile	Manuel Pellegrini	Spain	Villarreal	
2005	France	Francis Gillot	France	Lens	
2005	France	Jean Fernandez	France	Marseille	
2005	Germany	Thomas Doll	Germany	Hamburg	
2006	England	Glenn Roeder	England	Newcastle United	
2007	Netherlands	Huub Stevens	Germany	Hamburg	
2008	Portugal	Jorge Jesus	Portugal	Braga	

== By nationality ==
This table lists the total number of titles won by managers of each nationality.

Nationality	Number of wins
France	12
Germany	7
Italy	5
England	3
Spain	3
Chile	1
Denmark	1
Netherlands	1
Portugal	1
FR Yugoslavia	1

== See also ==
- List of UEFA club competition winning managers
