= ASD Pontevecchio =

Italian football club

Pontevecchio
- Full name: Associazione Sportiva Dilettantistica Pontevecchio
- Founded: 1945
- Ground: Stadio degli Ornari, Ponte San Giovanni, Perugia, Italy
- Capacity: 1,000
- Chairman: Giovanni Monsignori
- Manager: Luciano Marini
- League: Serie D/E
- 2012–13: Serie D/E, 14th
Home colours	Away colours

Associazione Sportiva Dilettantistica Pontevecchio are an Italian association football club located in Ponte San Giovanni, a suburb of Perugia, Umbria. It currently play in Serie D.

== History ==
Pontevecchio was founded in 1945.

=== The coach Cosmi ===
The club is known for having been coached by Serse Cosmi during the 1990s; during his tenure as head coach, the club achieved a number of promotions which led them from Prima Categoria to Serie D. After Cosmi left Pontevecchio to join Arezzo, the club quickly returned down to the lower divisions, and returned to Serie D only after having won the 2006–07 Eccellenza regional league; the same season they won the Coppa Italia Dilettanti, defeating Caserta in the final.

== Colors and badge ==
The colours of the team are green and orange.

== Honours ==
- Coppa Italia Dilettanti
  - Winners: 2006–07
