= Terontola–Cortona railway station =

Train station in Cortona, Italy

Terontola–Cortona
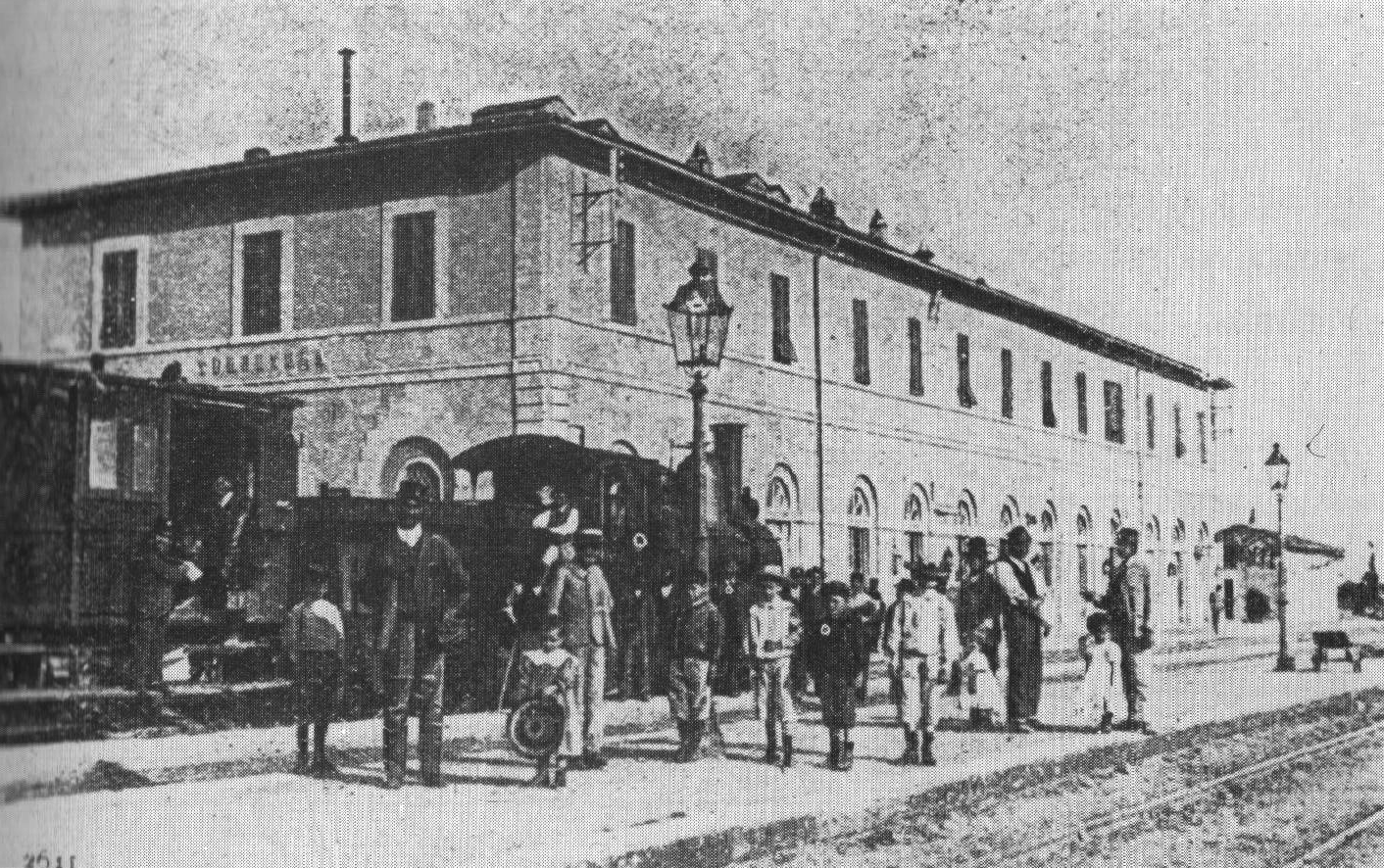
- The station in 1875, shortly after its inauguration

General information
- Location: Piazza Nazioni Unite; Terontola, Cortona, Tuscany, Italy
- Coordinates: 43°12′37″N 12°00′28″E
- Operator: Rete Ferroviaria Italiana
- Lines: Florence–Rome; Foligno–Terontola
- Tracks: 5 + 2 freight + 4 storage + 2 dismantled
- Train operators: Trenitalia

Other information
- Classification: Silver

History
- Opened: 1875; 151 years ago
- Electrified: 1935; 91 years ago
- Former names: Cortona–Terontola; Terontola
Location
- Location within Tuscany Location within Italy

Terontola–Cortona railway station (Stazione di Terontola–Cortona) is the main station of Cortona, Italy, located in the hamlet of Terontola. It is on the Florence–Rome railway and the line to Foligno (which passes through Perugia) branches off from the station.

== History ==
Terontola station was not opened with the other stations of the line in 1866. In fact, the Florence–Rome railway did not exist in its current form: the connection between Rome and Florence did not pass through Orvieto and Chiusi, but ran from Orte through Terni, Foligno and Perugia, along a route that is now divided into two lines: the Foligno–Terontola railway and part of the Rome–Ancona railway.

The line between Cortona (now Camucia-Cortona) and Chiusi was opened on 11 November 1875. It was decided to build a station at the junction between the two lines because the Cortona station was too far away. The new Terontola station opened together with the new line to Chiusi, constituted a major junction on the main line of the Italian railway system.

In 1939 it was renamed from "Terontola" to "Cortona-Terontola", and in 1948 it became "Terontola". It was later given its current name.

== Buildings and infrastructure ==
The station is equipped with a two-level passenger building. On the lower floor there is a ticket office, with ticket machines and a ticket counter, a waiting room, an office of the railway police and a bar, while the upper floor is used by Trenitalia.

There is also two freight loading areas;

- the first has a warehouse with an attached loading platform; two deadend sidings have been dismantled.
- the second has a large square and two other deadend sidings where work wagons are usually stabled for maintenance.

The station also has several other service buildings including an office for train control, where various Apparato Centrale Elettrico a Itinerari (an Italian system for controlling train movements at stations) desks are located.

There are five through tracks for passenger services: there are three platforms, two of which have a brick shelter, while the central one has an iron shelter. The platforms are connected via an underpass. There are also other tracks without a platform that are used to stable freight wagons.

== Rail services ==
Although traffic significantly decreased after the opening of the Florence–Rome high-speed railway, the number of passengers and trains is always at a high level, increased by interchange between the two lines. All regional services and some intercity services stop at the station.

== Station services ==
The station is managed by RFI, which classified it in 2008 in the silver category. It has:

- ticket counter
- ticket machines
- waiting room.
- station of the railway police
- toilets
- bar

== Interchange ==
Etruria Mobilità buses leave from the square in front of the station for the centre of Cortona. There is also a parking area for cars and bicycles.

- bus station
- taxi rank.
