= Perugia Ponte San Giovanni railway station =

Railway station in Italy

Perugia Ponte San Giovanni
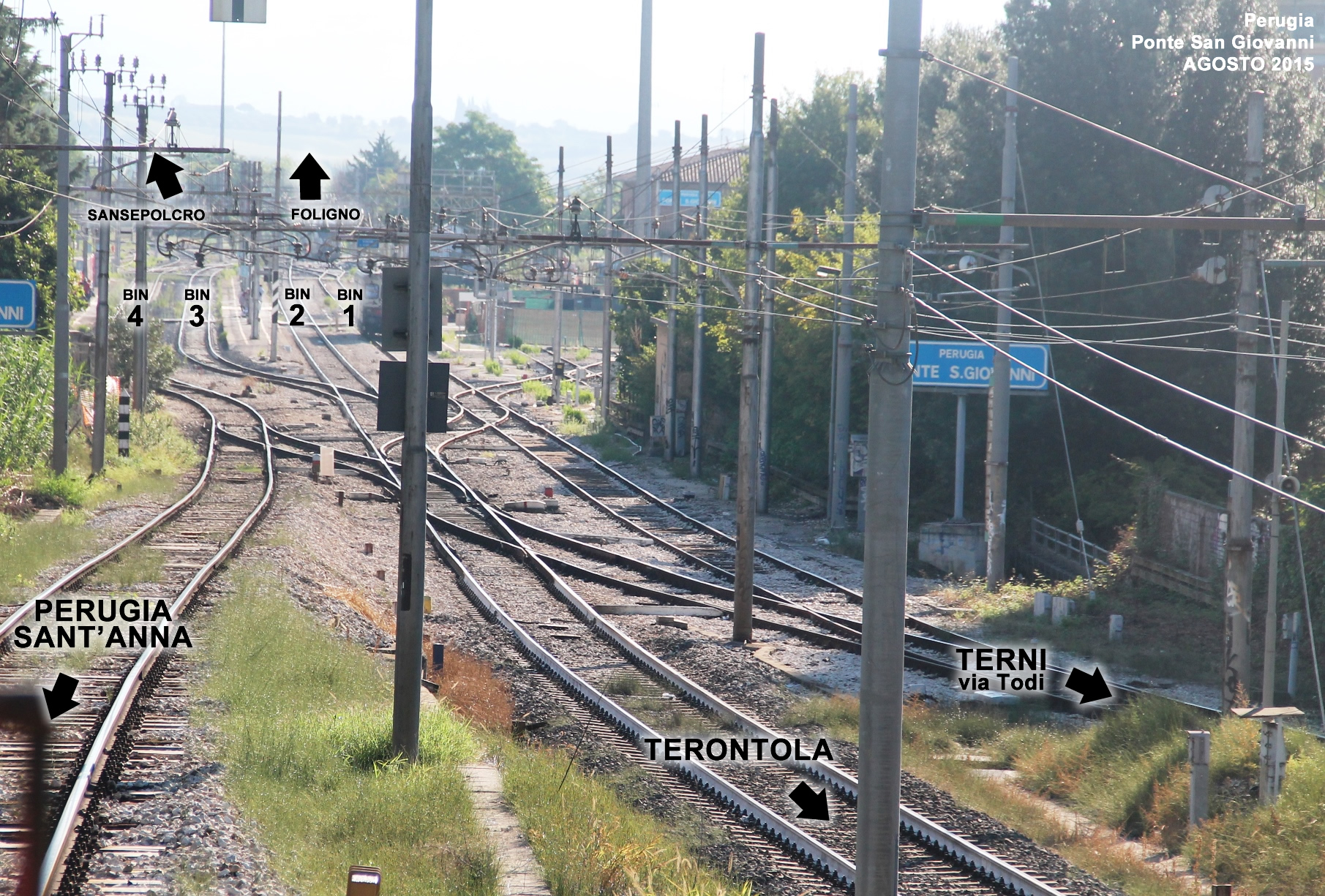
- Perugia Ponte San Giovanni platforms

General information
- Location: Via Nino Bixio, 2 Ponte San Giovanni, Perugia, Umbria, Italy
- Coordinates: 43°05′30″N 12°26′18″E
- Operator: Rete Ferroviaria Italiana
- Line: Foligno–Terontola
- Tracks: 4
- Train operators: Trenitalia

Other information
- Classification: Silver

History
- Opened: 1866; 160 years ago
- Electrified: May 1960; 66 years ago
Location
- Location within Umbria Location within Italy

Perugia Ponte San Giovanni railway station (Stazione di Perugia Ponte San Giovanni) is a station in the Ponte San Giovanni district of the city of Perugia, Italy. It is located at the junction of the Terontola–Perugia–Assisi–Foligno, Perugia–Terni and Perugia–Sansepolcro lines. Its buildings and infrastructure is managed by Rete Ferroviaria Italiana.

== History ==
The station was opened with the Foligno–Terontola railway in 1866. Its name was changed from Perugia Scalo Ponte San Giovanni to Perugia Ponte San Giovanni in 1927.

== Buildings and infrastructure ==
The station building is on two levels but only the ground floor is accessible by passengers. Two smaller, single-storey buildings symmetrically branch off from the station building. The entrances to the station building are covered by undulating canopies on both sides of the building, which also act as a shelter for track 1.

The station includes four through tracks:

- track 1 is used for crossing and overtaking movements on the Foligno–Terontola line.
- track 2 is a normal service track of the Foligno–Terontola line.
- track 3 is used for crossing and overtaking movements on the Foligno–Terontola line.
- track 4 is a running track of the Perugia–Terni line managed by the Rete Ferroviaria Italiana.

All the tracks are equipped with a platform and a shelter and the platforms are connected to each other by a modern underpass.

== Station services ==
The station is managed by RFI, which classified it in 2008 in the silver category. It has:

- ticket counter
- ticket machines
- waiting room.
- toilets
- bar
