= Pierantonio =

Pierantonio is a given name of Italian origin. Notable people with this name include:

- Pierantonio Clementi (born 1947), Italian biathlete
- Pierantonio Costa (1939–2021), Italian businessman and diplomat
- Pierantonio Stiattesi (fl. 1612), Italian Renaissance artist
- Pierantonio Tasca (1858–1934), Italian opera composer
- Pierantonio Tremolada (born 1956), Italian catholic bishop

== See also ==
- A.S.D. Pierantonio Calcio 1965, an Italian association football club
