= Foligno railway station =

Railway station in Foligno, Italy

Foligno
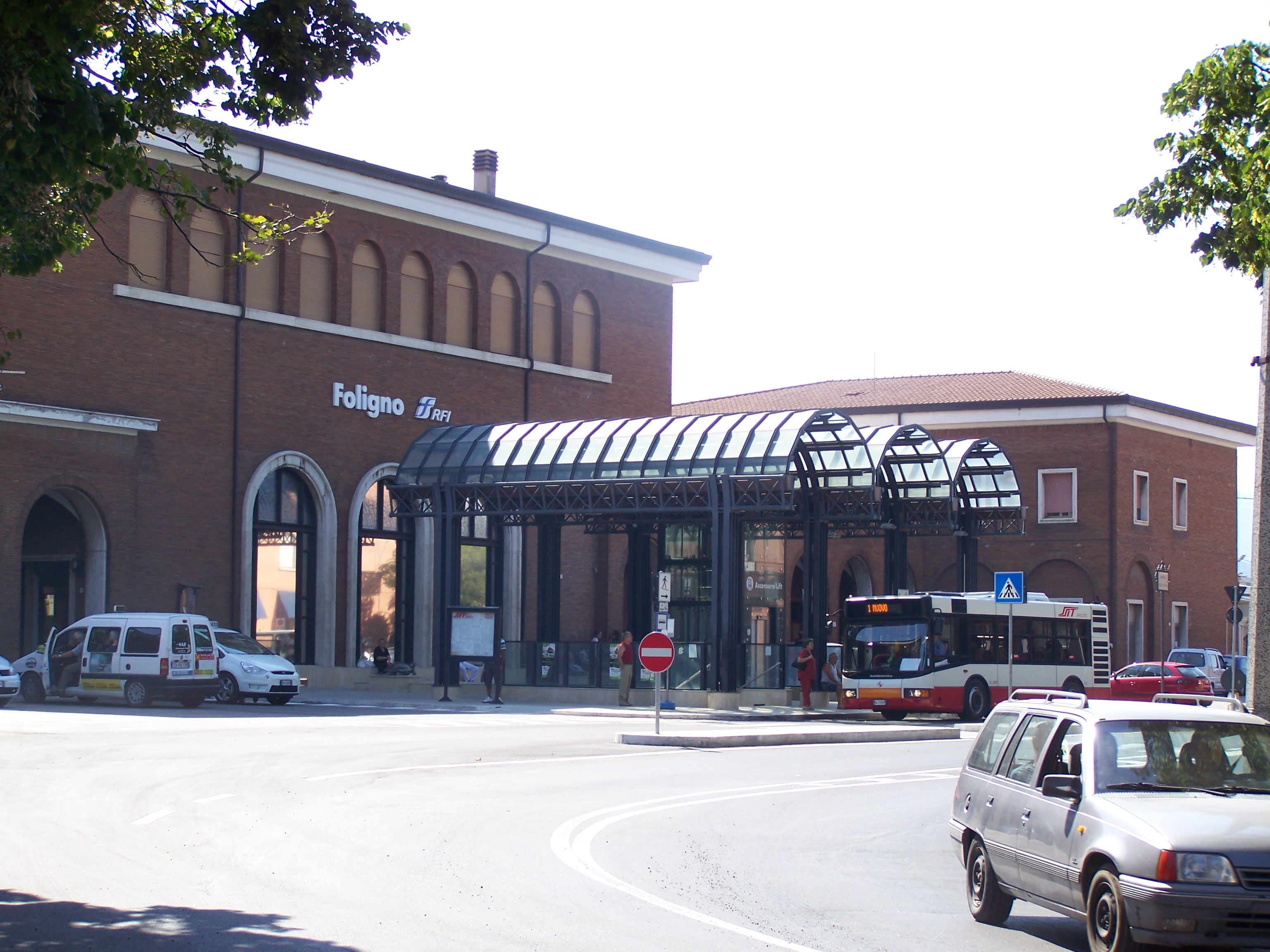
- View of the passenger building.

General information
- Location: Piazzale Unità d'Italia 17-19; 06034 Foligno PG; Foligno, Perugia, Umbria; Italy
- Coordinates: 42°57′16″N 12°42′40″E
- Elevation: 239 m (784 ft)
- Operator: Rete Ferroviaria Italiana; Centostazioni
- Lines: Ancona–Orte; Foligno–Terontola
- Distance: 165.971 km (103.130 mi) from Roma Termini
- Platforms: 6
- Train operators: Trenitalia; Ferrovia Centrale Umbra
- Connections: Urban buses

Construction
- Architect: Paolo Perilli

Other information
- Classification: Gold

History
- Opened: 4 January 1866; 160 years ago
Location
- Location within Umbria Location within Italy

Foligno railway station (Italian: Stazione di Foligno) serves the town and comune of Foligno, in the region of Umbria, central Italy. It is also the most important railway junction in Umbria. Opened in 1866, it forms part of the Ancona–Orte railway, and is the southeastern terminus of the Foligno–Terontola railway, which links Florence with Rome.

The station is currently managed by Rete Ferroviaria Italiana (RFI). However, the commercial area of the passenger building is managed by Centostazioni. Train services are operated by or on behalf of Trenitalia. Each of these companies is a subsidiary of Ferrovie dello Stato (FS), Italy's state-owned rail company.

Regional train services on the Foligno–Terontola railway are operated by Ferrovia Centrale Umbra, which sub-contracts on behalf of Trenitalia.

== Location ==
Foligno railway station is situated at Piazzale Unità d'Italia, at the eastern end of the city centre.

== History ==
The station was opened on 4 January 1866, upon the inauguration of the Orte–Foligno section of the Rome–Ancona railway. A few months later, on 29 April 1866, that line was extended from Foligno to Falconara Marittima. Then, on 21 July 1866, Foligno became a junction station, when the Foligno–Collestrada section of the Foligno–Terontola railway was opened.

The station has since been expanded and rebuilt several times because of destruction caused by earthquakes and bombing raids.

The current passenger building was built as a project of Paolo Perilli, to replace the building destroyed during World War II. It was opened in 1949.

== Features ==
The passenger building is a large multi level structure with many passenger services, including a shipping department, railway police station, bar, restaurant, newsagent, tobacconist, ATMs, car and bicycle rental, infirmary and a Roman Catholic chapel.

The station has six tracks reserved for passengers and equipped with platforms outfitted with canopies. The platforms are numbered from 1 to 5, and 1 north, which is a bay platform constructed originally to serve the Foligno–Terontola line. The platforms are also linked with each other by two passenger lifts and subways leading to Piazzale Unità d'Italia and its interchange facilities.

Another six tracks are used as a goods yard or for carriage storage. In this part of the station yard are also a locomotive shed, an old water column and an electrical substation.

== Train services ==
The station has about 2.3 million passenger movements each year.

Approximately 100 trains call at the station daily (about 25 train pairs on each line). These trains range from regional services to InterCity and Eurostar trains.

Regional services on the Foligno–Terontola railway are operated by Ferrovia Centrale Umbra, which sub-contracts on behalf of Trenitalia. All other train services are operated by Trenitalia itself.

== Interchange ==
The station is connected with Foligno's urban transport system by bus and shuttle bus services. It also has parking spaces for about 1,200 vehicles.

== See also ==
- History of rail transport in Italy
- List of railway stations in Umbria
- Rail transport in Italy
- Railway stations in Italy
