= Ponte San Giovanni =

- Frazione
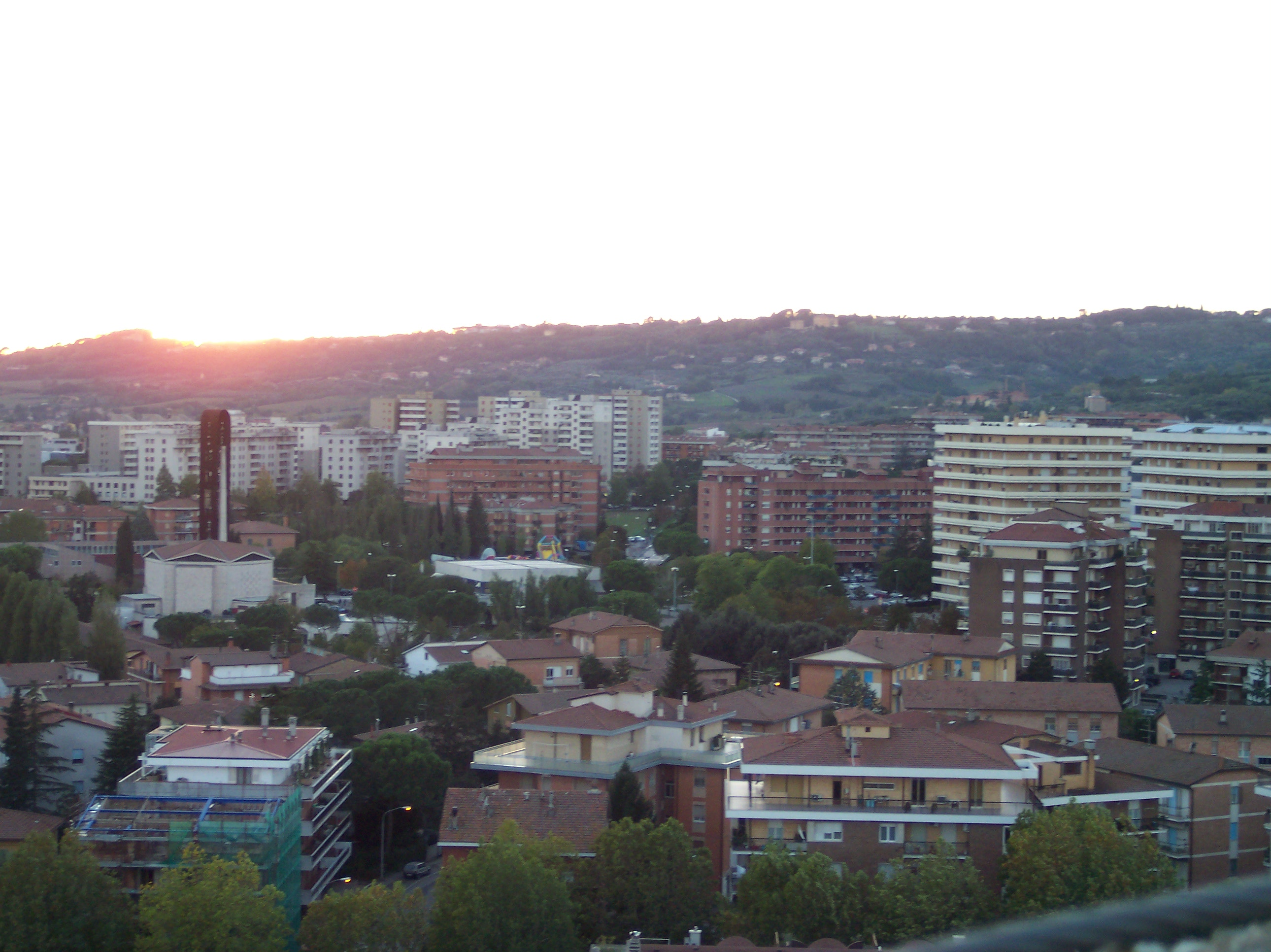

- Location of Ponte San Giovanni in Italy
- Coordinates: 43°05′23″N 12°26′44″E
- Country: Italy
- Region: Umbria
- Province: Perugia (PG)
- Comune: Perugia

Area
  - Total: 18 km^{2} (6.9 sq mi)
- Elevation: 189 m (620 ft)

Population (2021)
  - Total: 11,562
  - Density: 640/km^{2} (1,700/sq mi)
- Demonym: Ponteggiani
- Time zone: UTC+1 (CET)
  - Summer (DST): UTC+2 (CEST)
- Dialing code: 075

Ponte San Giovanni is a frazione of the city of Perugia, Italy. It is one of the largest and most populated neighbourhoods of the capital of Umbria. It is also the seat of the eighth ward of the municipality of Perugia.

According to the 2021 census, Ponte San Giovanni stands at an elevation of 189 metres (620 ft) above sea level and has a population of 11,562 inhabitants. (Note: To obtain the data from the website: 1. Select "Basi Territoriali 2021: Confini amministrativi, Località, Sezioni di censimento, Aree SubCom".; 2. Use the search function to find the desired place.; 3. Click the Attribute Table icon in the top-right corner.; 4. In the panel that appears at the bottom of the page, select "Località 2021".)

The local inhabitants are known as ponteggiani.

== History ==
In 1859, Ponte San Giovanni had a population of 340 inhabitants, organized into 38 families living in 61 houses. In the mid-19th century, the presence of the main stagecoach route linking Perugia with Rome supported several small businesses, including shops, cafés and inns.

Between the late 19th and early 20th centuries Ponte San Giovanni expanded rapidly, especially around the railway station. New industrial plants supported economic growth and attracted workers from nearby areas. The railway connections, developed between 1866 and 1920, strengthened links with Perugia and the rest of Umbria.

During World War II, the town's strategic position as a rail and road junction made it a target of heavy bombing between 1943 and 1944. Factories, the railway station, bridges, and the church of San Bartolomeo were severely damaged, and much of the settlement was destroyed before post-war reconstruction.

== Geography ==
Ponte San Giovanni is located about 3 miles from Perugia. The settlement lies along the Tiber River. In the 19th century, its riverside position made it a popular destination for bathing among residents of Perugia.

== Sports ==
The area is home to the football club A.S.D. Pontevecchio, which currently plays in the Italian Serie D (fifth tier). Ponte San Giovanni is also the birthplace of Italian football manager Serse Cosmi.
