= Rome–Ancona railway =

Key central Italian transport link

Ancona–Orte

Overview
- Status: Operational
- Line number: 105, 106, 114
- Locale: Italy
- Termini: Ancona; Orte

Service
- Type: Heavy rail
- System: Italian railway system
- Operator(s): RFI (2001–present); FS (1905–2001); RA (1885–1905); SFR (1866–1885)

History
- Opened: 1866

Technical
- Line length: 212 km (132 mi)
- Number of tracks: 2 (Ancona–Montecarotto, P.M. 228–Fabriano, Foligno–Campello, Terni–Orte) otherwise 1
- Track gauge: 1,435 mm (4 ft 8 1/2 in) standard gauge
- Electrification: 3 kV DC
- Operating speed: 180 km/h (110 mph)

The Rome–Ancona railway (or Ancona–Orte railway) is a rail line in central Italy connecting the city of Ancona with Orte, and therefore with the capital city, Rome. The line crosses the Apennine Mountains from the Adriatic Sea to the Tyrrhenian Sea, passing through Foligno, Spoleto, and Terni.

== History ==
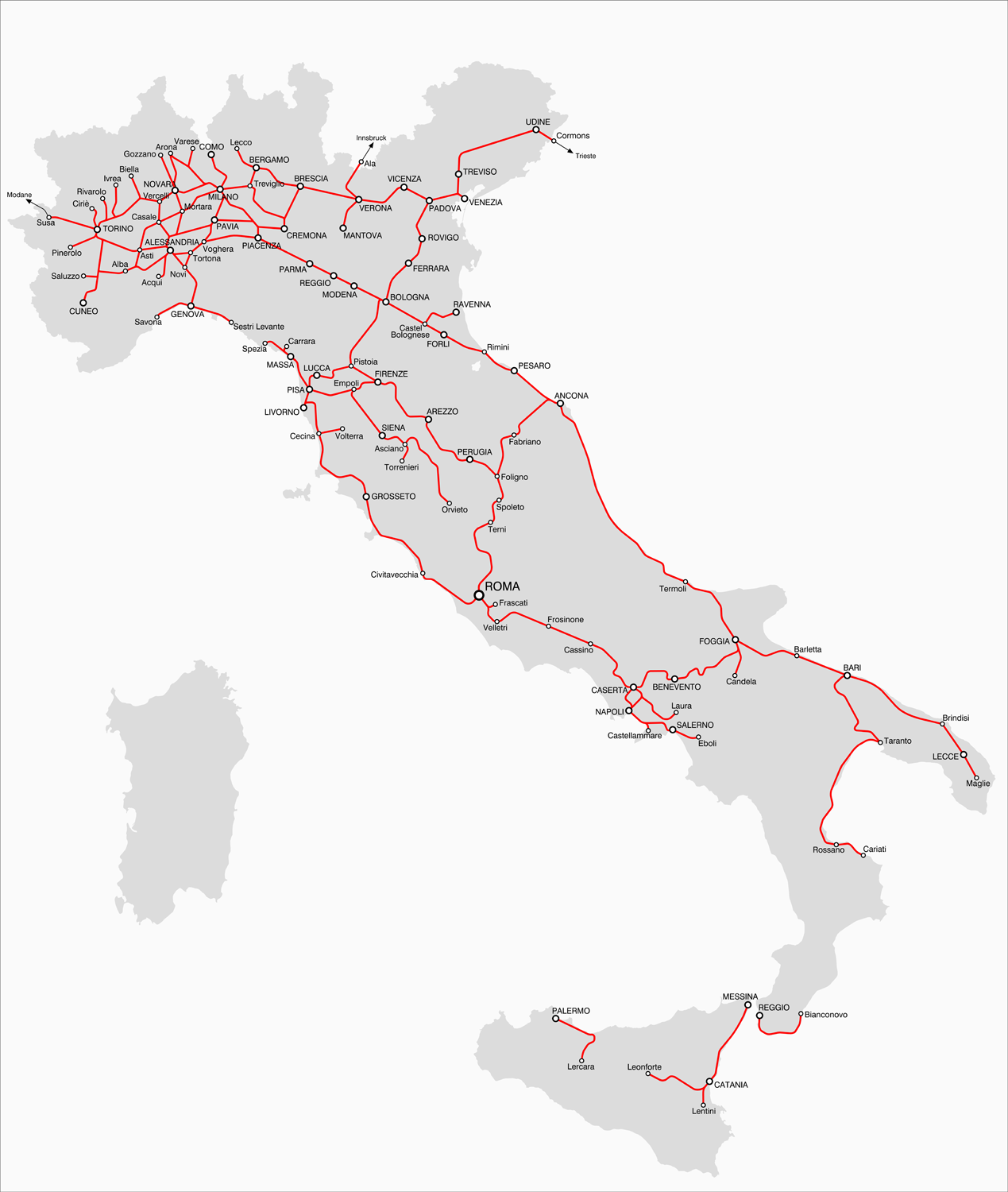
A map of railway lines in Italy in 1870, with the Ancona–Orte line completed.

Track	Opened
Falconara Marittima–Ancona	17 November 1861 (Note: Part of Bologna–Ancona railway.)
Rome-Orte	1 April 1865 (Note: Part of Florence–Rome railway.)
Orte–Foligno	4 January 1866
Foligno–Falconara Marittima	29 April 1866

Plans for a railway line between Rome and the Adriatic coast began in 1846 in the Papal state, after the death of Pope Gregory XVI, who strongly opposed rail. The construction of the new railway was authorized on 7 November 1846 by the new Pope Pius IX, to link Rome with the main port on the Adriatic sea, Ancona. The aim was also to reach Bologna and Modena, and thus to connect the Papal state to Lombardy and Veneto railway network.

The project was initially named Strada Ferrata «Pio Centrale» in honor of the Pope, but was finished only on 29 April 1866, under the newly born Kingdom of Italy. Works were slowed by the process of Italian unification, lack of funds, and complications due to the difficult terrain. However, the partially completed line was opened since 1865, with trains operated by Società per le strade ferrate romane (SSFR).

The line was interrupted by Papal army in 1870 in an attempt to fight back the Italian army invading Rome. The line was soon reactivated once Rome became capital of the Kingdom. The state took control of the line after the failure of SSFR. The line was subsequently incorporated into the Adriatic network and managed by Società Italiana per le strade ferrate meridionali (Italian company for southern railways), which doubled tracks between Rome and Orte in 1890.

The management of the line was moved to Ferrovie dello Stato (FS) in 1905. In 1907, the section between Ancona and Falconara Marittima was doubled. The electrification of the line was completed on 28 October 1935, and travel time reduced from about 7 to 4 hours. The line was severely damaged in the Second World War and was completely reopened in 1946.

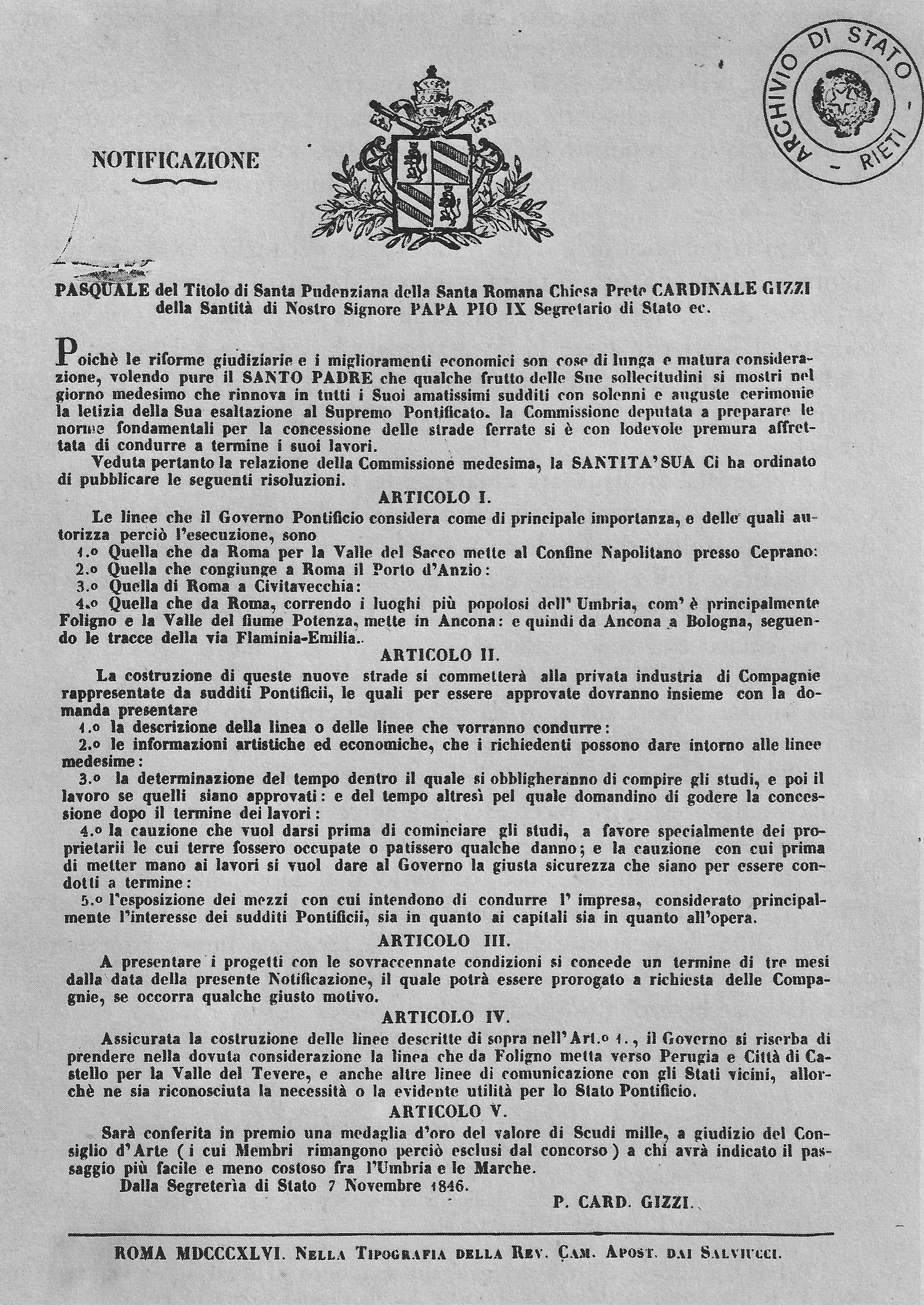
Act establishing the start of works, 7 November 1846

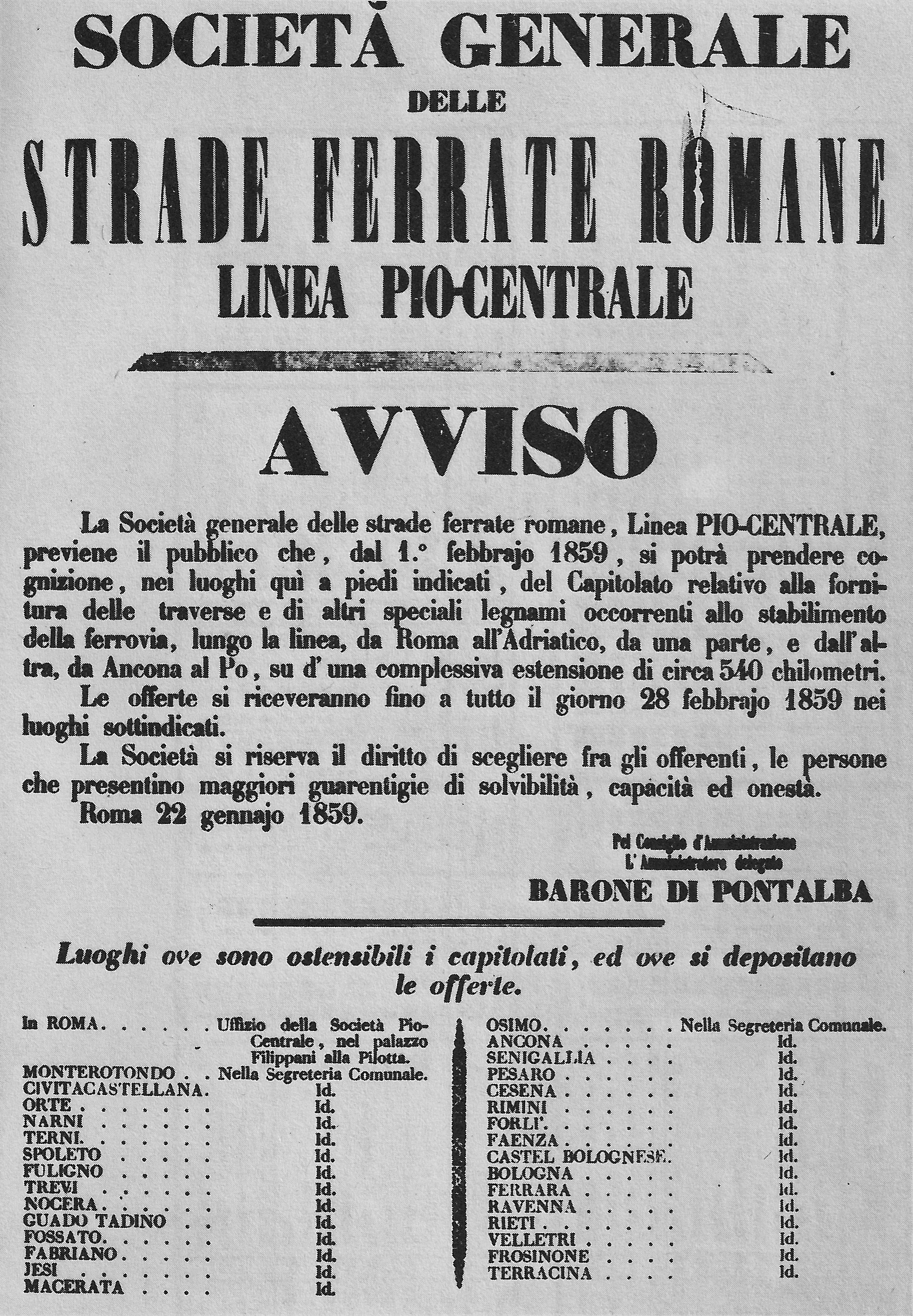
Tender for construction materials (1859)

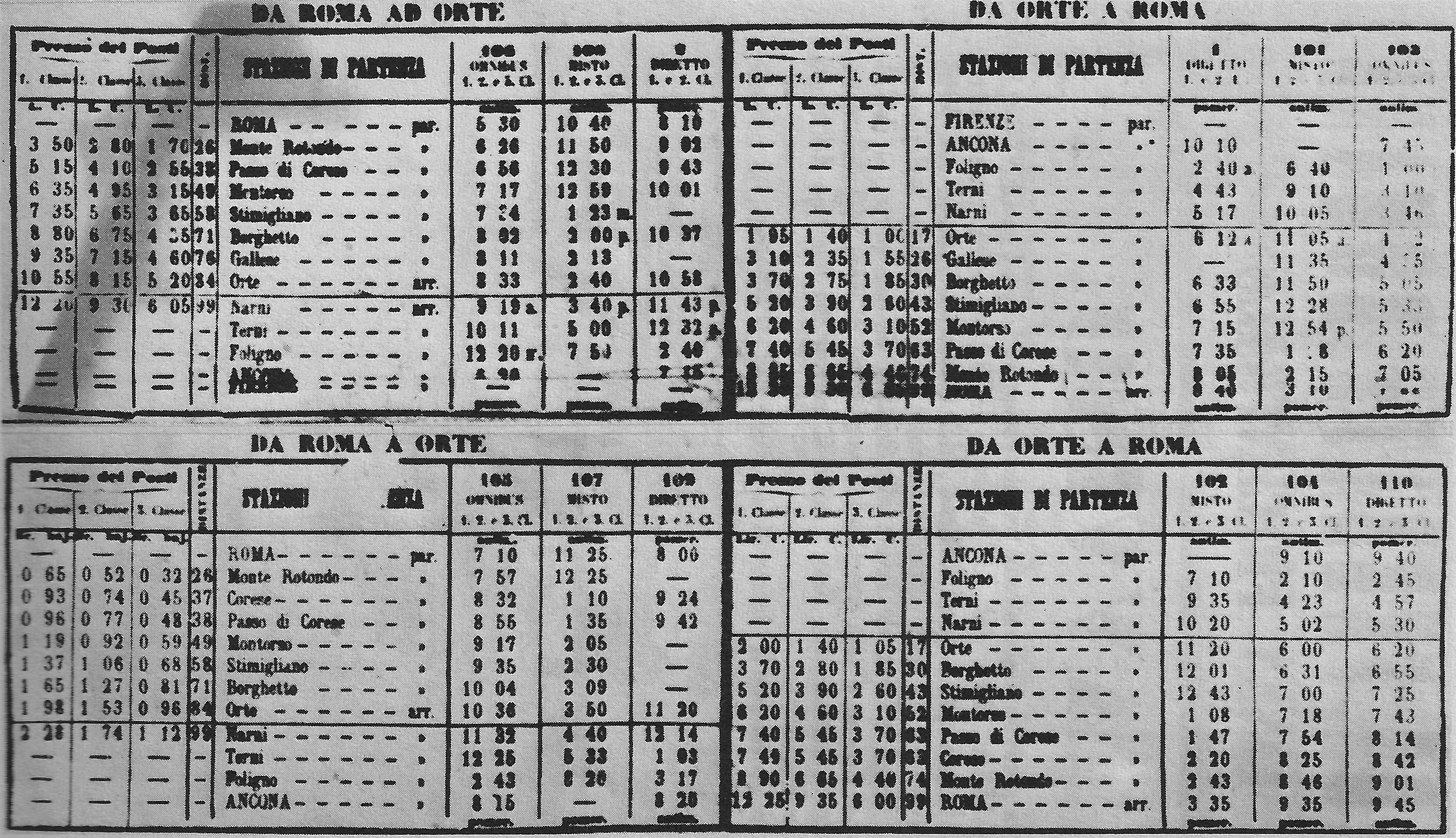
Timetable from December 1866

== Operation ==
Regional and Intercity trains are operated on the line by Trenitalia. The capacity is severely limited by single-track sections. Of the total length of 299 km, 125 km are single track.

== See also ==
- List of railway lines in Italy
