= Terni–Perugia–Sansepolcro railway =

Railway line in Italy

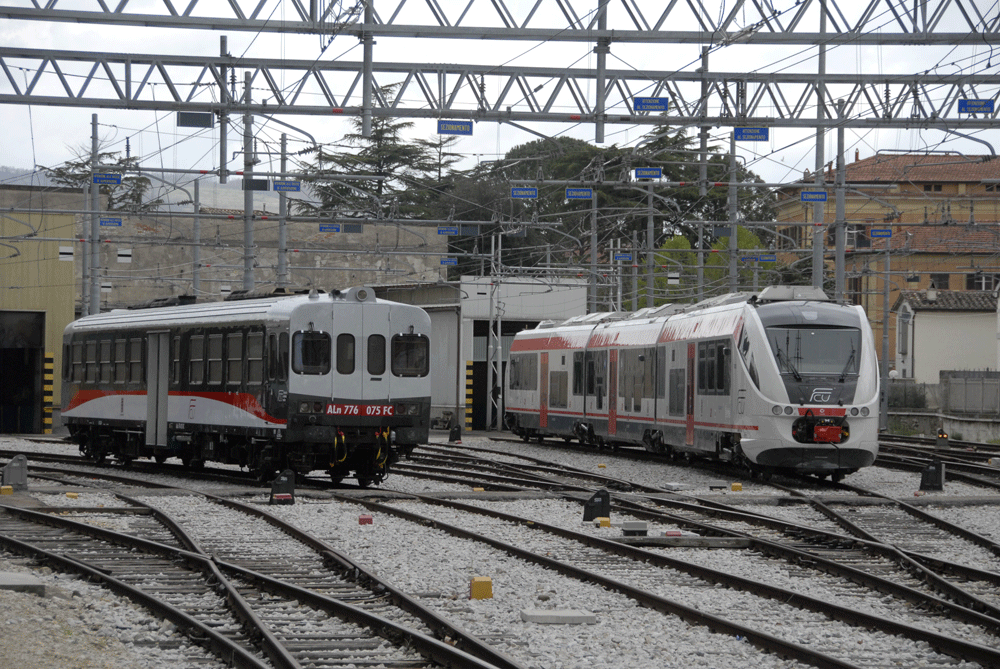
- ALn 776 and Minuetto trains

Overview
- Native name: Ferrovia Centrale Umbra
- Owner: Rete Ferroviaria Italiana

Service
- Operator: Busitalia
- Ridership: 1,089,420 (2016)

History
- Opened: 12 July 1915

Technical
- Line length: 147 km (91 mi)
- Track gauge: 1,435 mm (4 ft 8 1/2 in) standard gauge
Network map
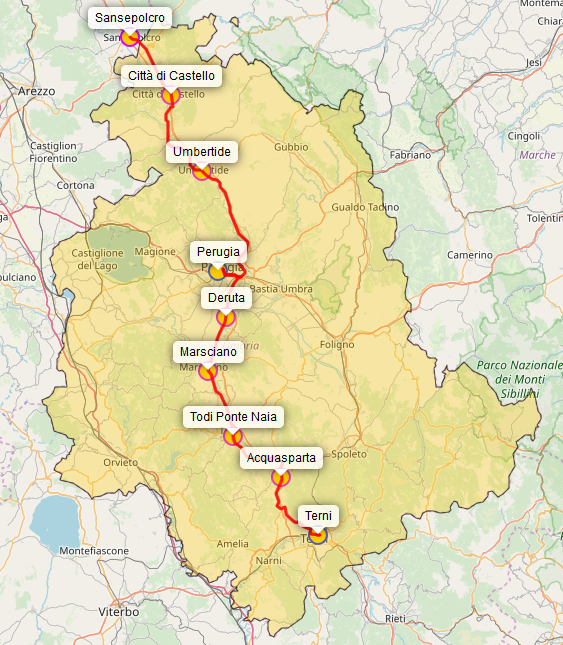
- Source: Italian railway atlas

Terni–Perugia–Sansepolcro railway is a railway line in Umbria, Italy. It was built by the Ferrovia Centrale Umbra (Central Umbrian Railway Company, FCU) The line, about 147 kilometres (91 mi) in length, connects Terni in southern Umbria with Sansepolcro, Tuscany, with stops in Todi, Perugia, Umbertide and Città di Castello. It is operated by Busitalia Sita Nord, a subsidiary of the Ferrovie dello Stato Italiane group.

== History ==
The line was inaugurated on 12 July 1915.

In 1920 it was electrified at 11 kV 25 Hz.

It was partially destroyed during World War II, and gradually reopened between October 1944 and May 1953.

In 1956 it was converted to 3 kV DC.

Passenger numbers peaked at 3,001,900 in 1975. In the late 1970s, due to its poor financial results and the risk of closure, the railway was taken over by the Province of Perugia.

In 2000, the rail operator was reorganized into a company owned by the regional government, and in December 2010 it was subsumed into a holding company gathering all the regional public transport services. In 2009, the company employed 211 people. In the late 2000s, the company depended on public subsidies for 71% to 87% of its operating income. In December 2005, a service linking Sansepolcro to Roma Termini station was launched. In April 2013 a train came off the rails near Umbertide, injuring 23 passengers. The regional public transport holding, Umbria Mobilità, was sold to Busitalia in 2014.

All passenger services were cancelled in September 2017 and partially restored in October 2018; they now operate on a 54 kilometres (34 mi) section between Città di Castello and Perugia Ponte San Giovanni.

== Infrastructure ==
The main line has a maximum grade of 2%, reaching 6% on the branch between Perugia Sant'Anna and Perugia Ponte San Giovanni. The minimum curve radius is 300 m (980 ft) on the main line, and 250 m (820 ft) between Perugia Sant'Anna and Perugia Ponte San Giovanni.

The speed limit on the line was originally set at 90 km/h (56 mph), with an average travel speed of 64 km/h (40 mph). Due to the poor state of maintenance of the tracks and regulatory changes after the Andria–Corato train collision in 2016, the limit was lowered to 70 km/h (43 mph) in October 2016, and further reduced to a maximum speed of 50 km/h (31 mph) in October 2018.

Stations north of Perugia, such as the ones in Umbertide and Città di Castello, tend to be close to the city center, while south of Perugia (such as in Marsciano and Todi) they are generally more remote.

== Passenger services ==
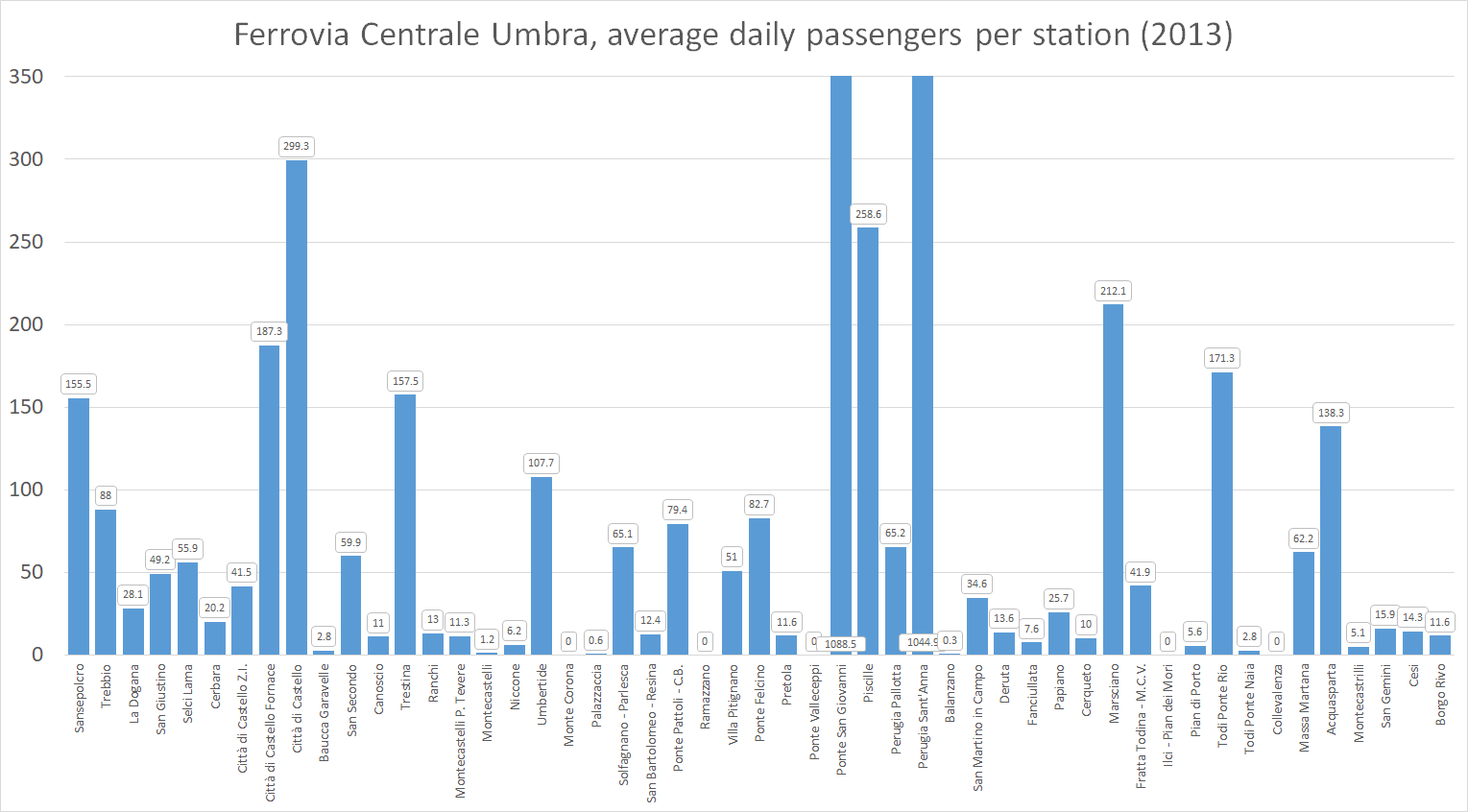
Average daily passengers per station in 2013

According to a 2013 survey, 25.9% of trains ran with fewer than 30 people on board, reaching 71.6% between Sansepolcro and Città di Castello. The busiest segment is the line between Ponte San Giovanni and Perugia Sant'Anna with an average of 2,400 passengers per day. Several stations and stops recorded an average of zero passengers per day.

=== Rolling stock ===
As of 2014 the rolling stock was made up of 45 diesel-powered ALn 776 and four electric-powered Minuetto trains. The ALn 776 trains were built between 1986 and 1993. The four Minuettos were purchased in 2008. Owing to the high cost of spare parts, as of 2014 three are nonoperational, while one remains in active service.

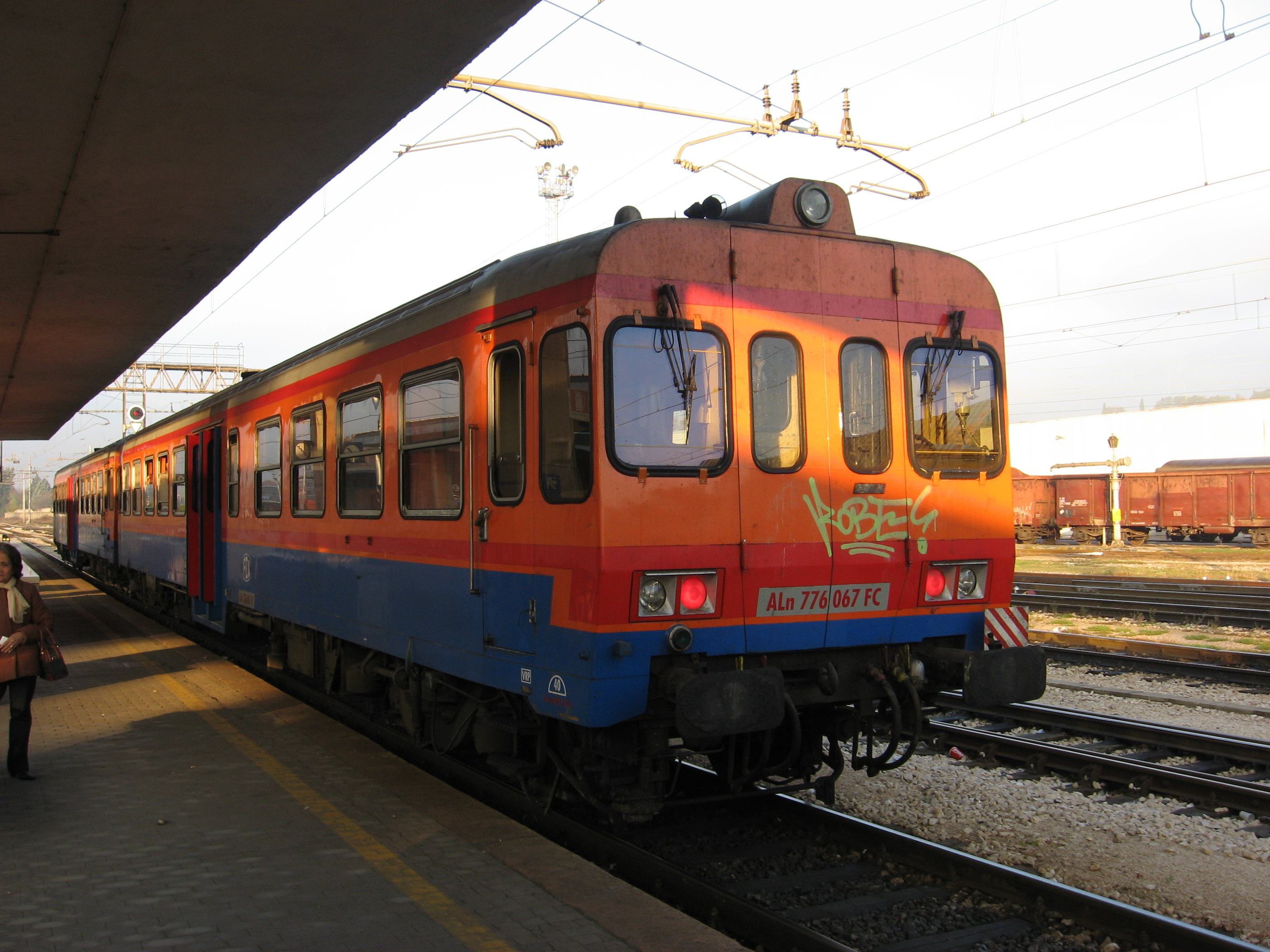
FCU ALn 776–076 in Terni

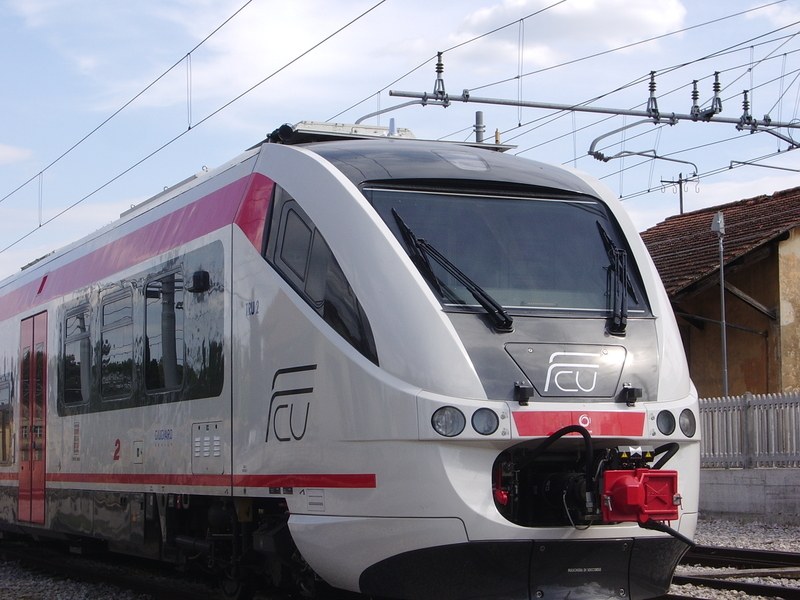
Pinturicchio electric traction train

== Routes ==
The following stations, stops and halts were served in December 2010, many of them as request stops. As of May 2019, most are inactive; stations currently served by rail are marked with a green diamond (◆).

Route Terni – Todi – Ponte San Giovanni – Perugia Sant'Anna:

- Terni
- Borgo Rivo
- Cesi
- San Gemini
- Montecastrilli
- Acquasparta
- Massa Martana
- San Faustino - Casigliano
- Collevalenza
- Todi Ponte Naia
- Todi Ponte Rio
- Pian di Porto
- Ilci - Pian dei Mori
- Fratta Todina - Monte Castello di Vibio
- Marsciano
- Cerqueto
- Papiano
- Fanciullata
- Deruta
- San Martino in Campo
- Balanzano
- Perugia - Ponte San Giovanni
- Piscille
- Perugia Pallotta
- Perugia Sant'Anna

Route Perugia Sant'Anna – Ponte San Giovanni – Umbertide – Sansepolcro:

- Perugia Sant'Anna
- Perugia Pallotta
- Piscille
- Perugia - Ponte San Giovanni ◆
- Ponte Valleceppi
- Pretola
- Ponte Felcino ◆
- Villa Pitignano ◆
- Ramazzano
- Ponte Pattoli - Civitella Benazzone ◆
- San Bartolomeo - Resina
- Solfagnano - Parlesca ◆
- Palazzaccia
- Pierantonio ◆
- Monte Corona
- Umbertide ◆
- Niccone
- Montecastelli
- Montecastelli Ponte Tevere ◆
- Ranchi
- Trestina ◆
- Canoscio
- San Secondo ◆
- Baucca Garavelle
- Città di Castello ◆
- Città di Castello Fornace
- Città di Castello Zona Industriale
- Cerbara
- Selci Lama
- San Giustino
- La Dogana
- Trebbio
- Sansepolcro

=== Gallery ===
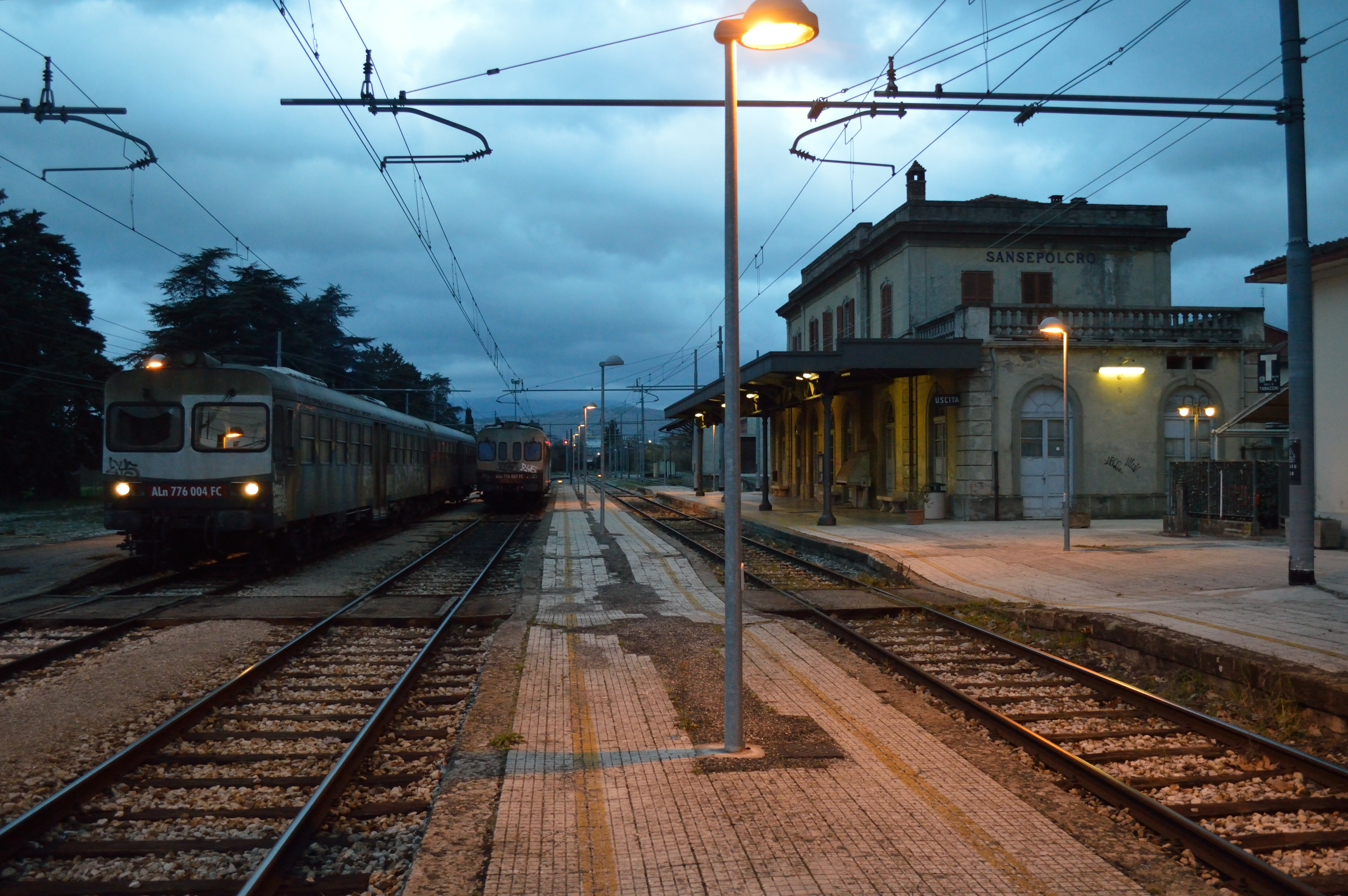
Sansepolcro

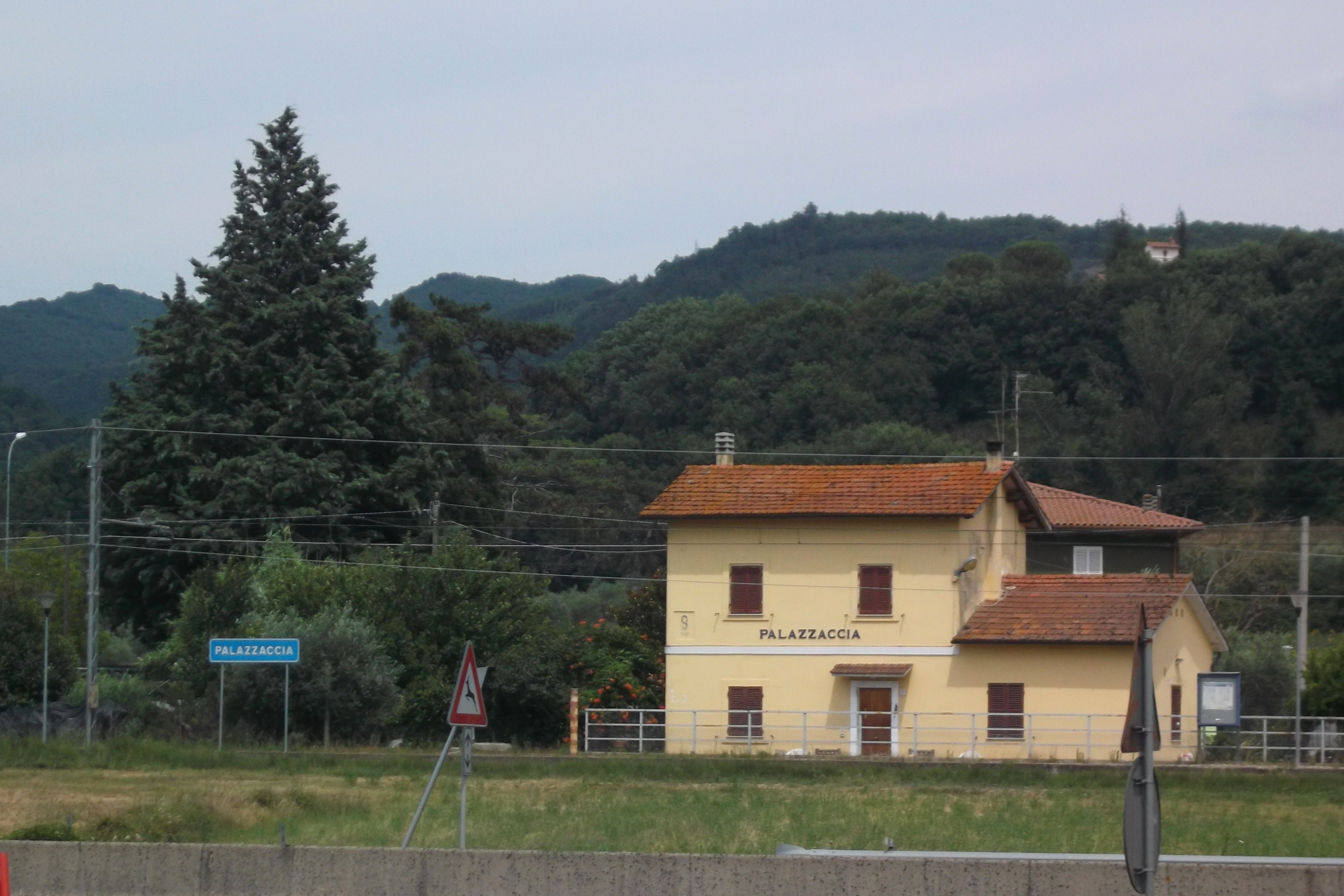
Palazzaccia

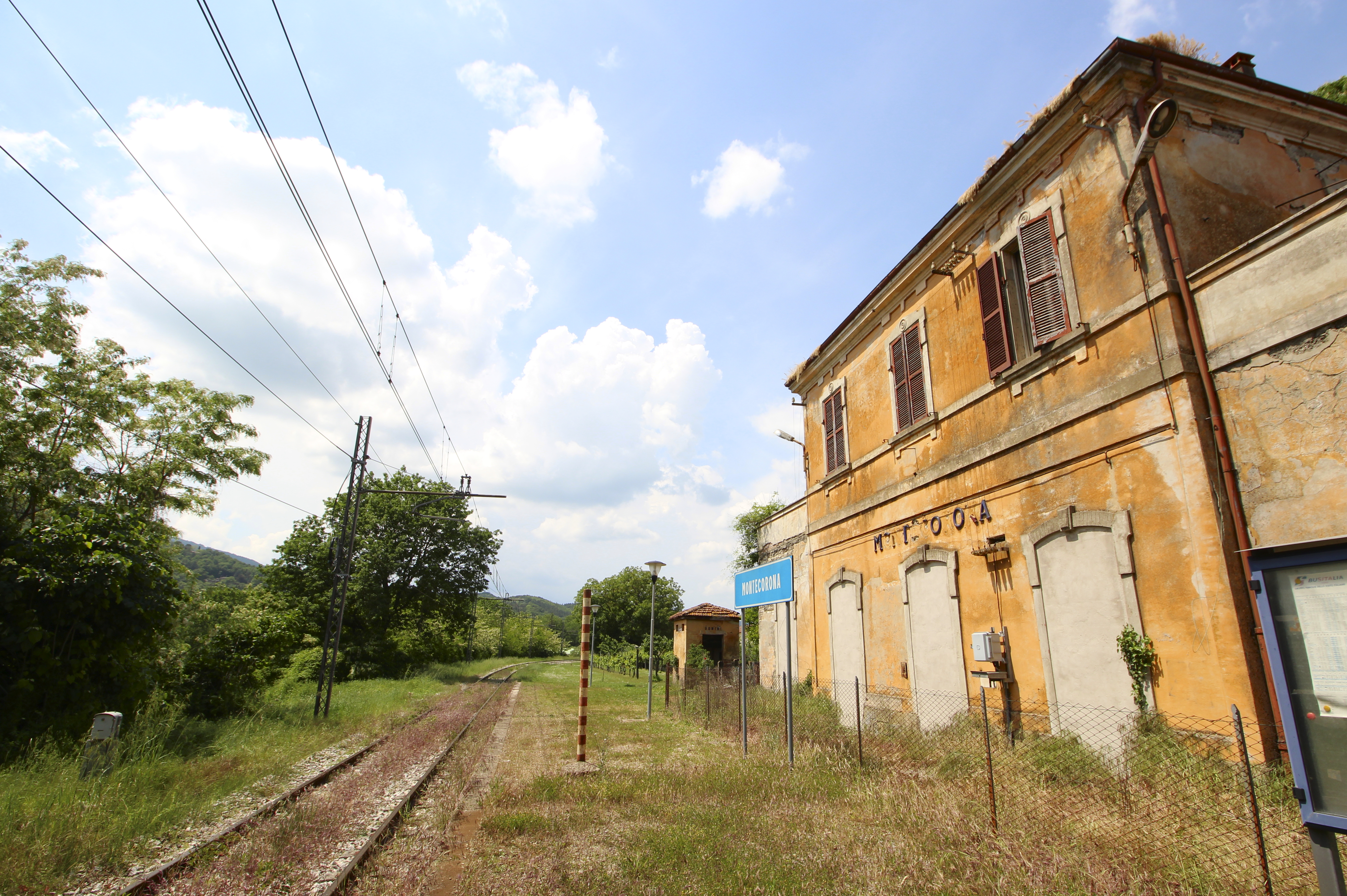
Monte Corona

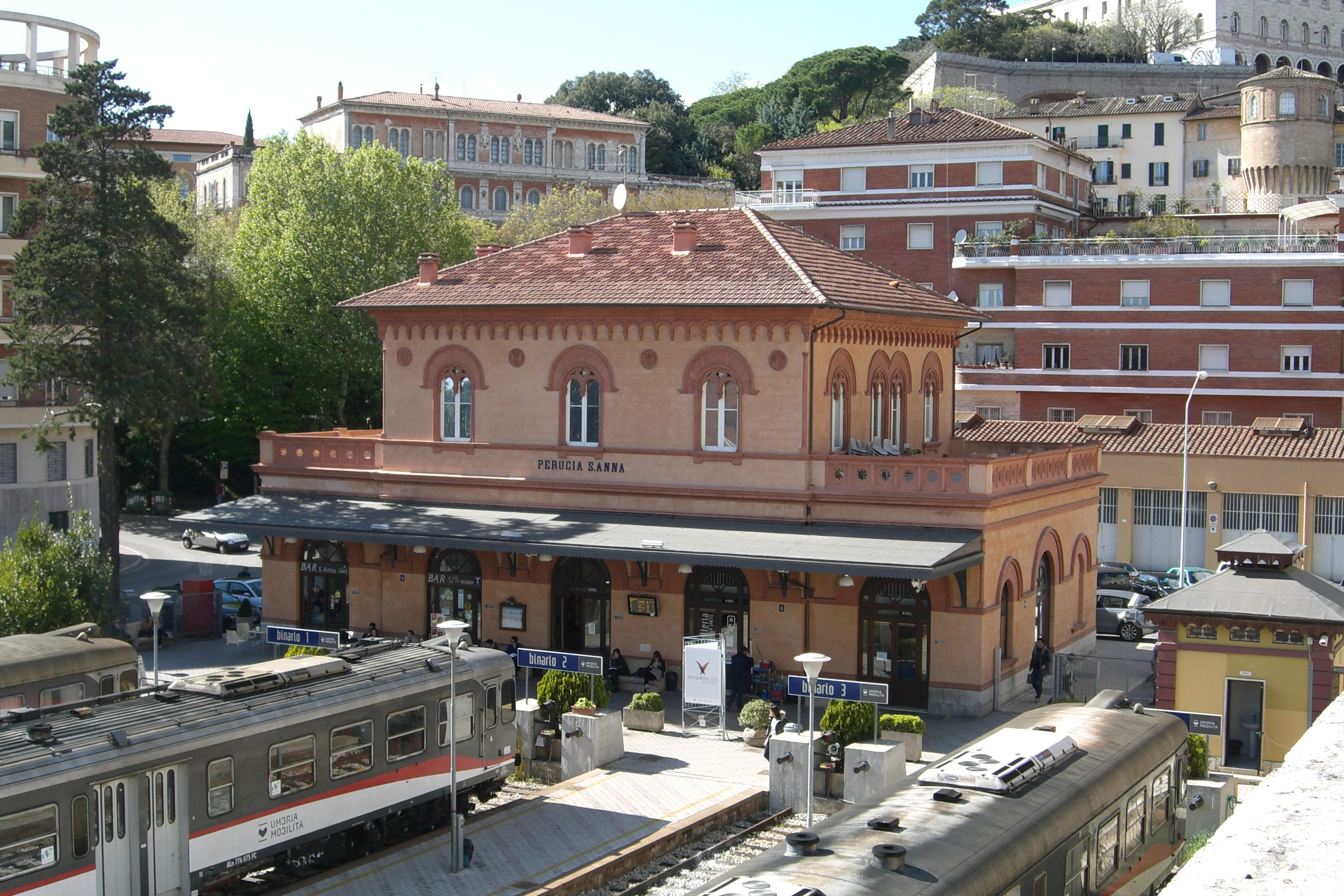
Perugia Sant'Anna

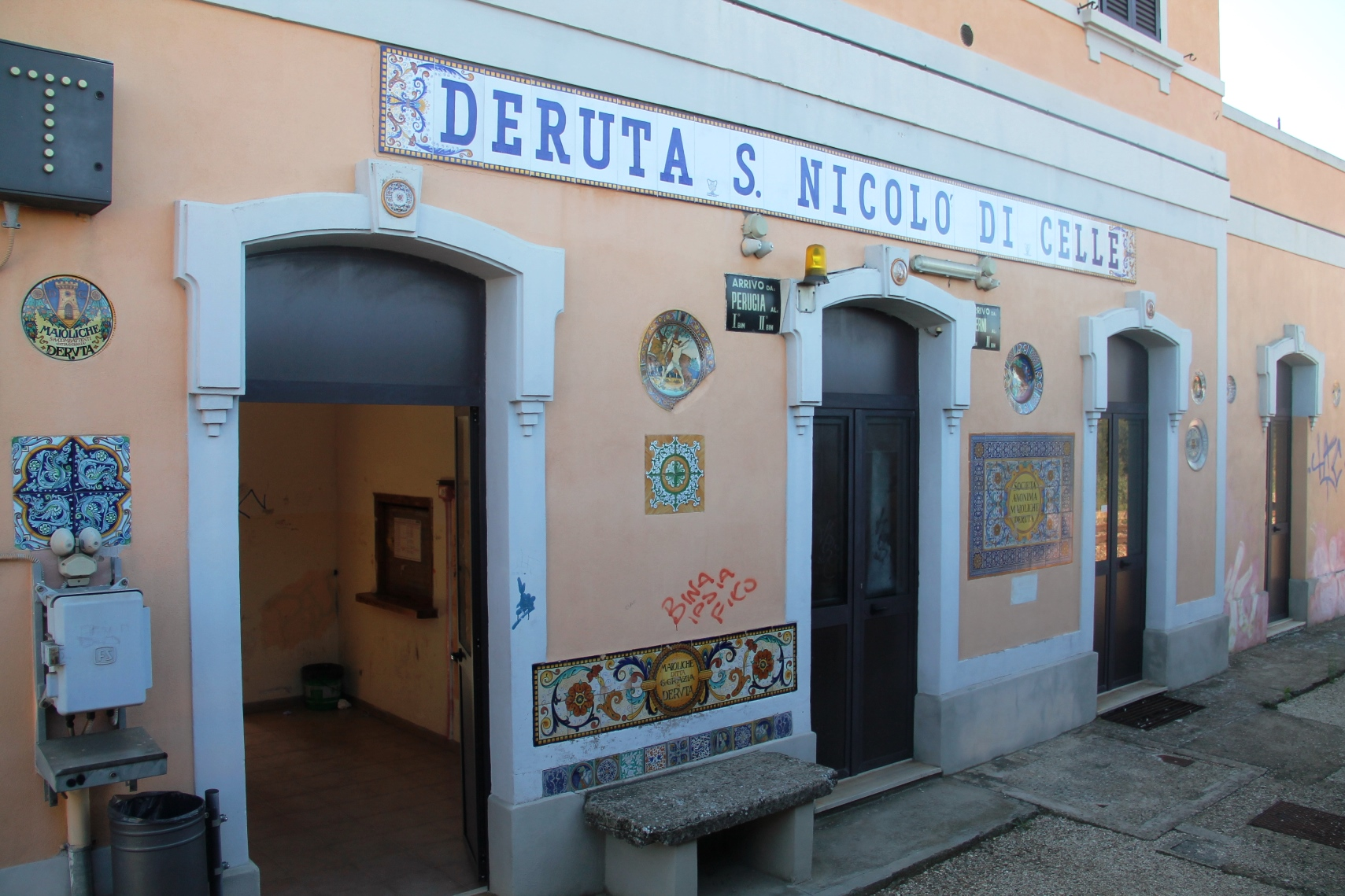
Deruta

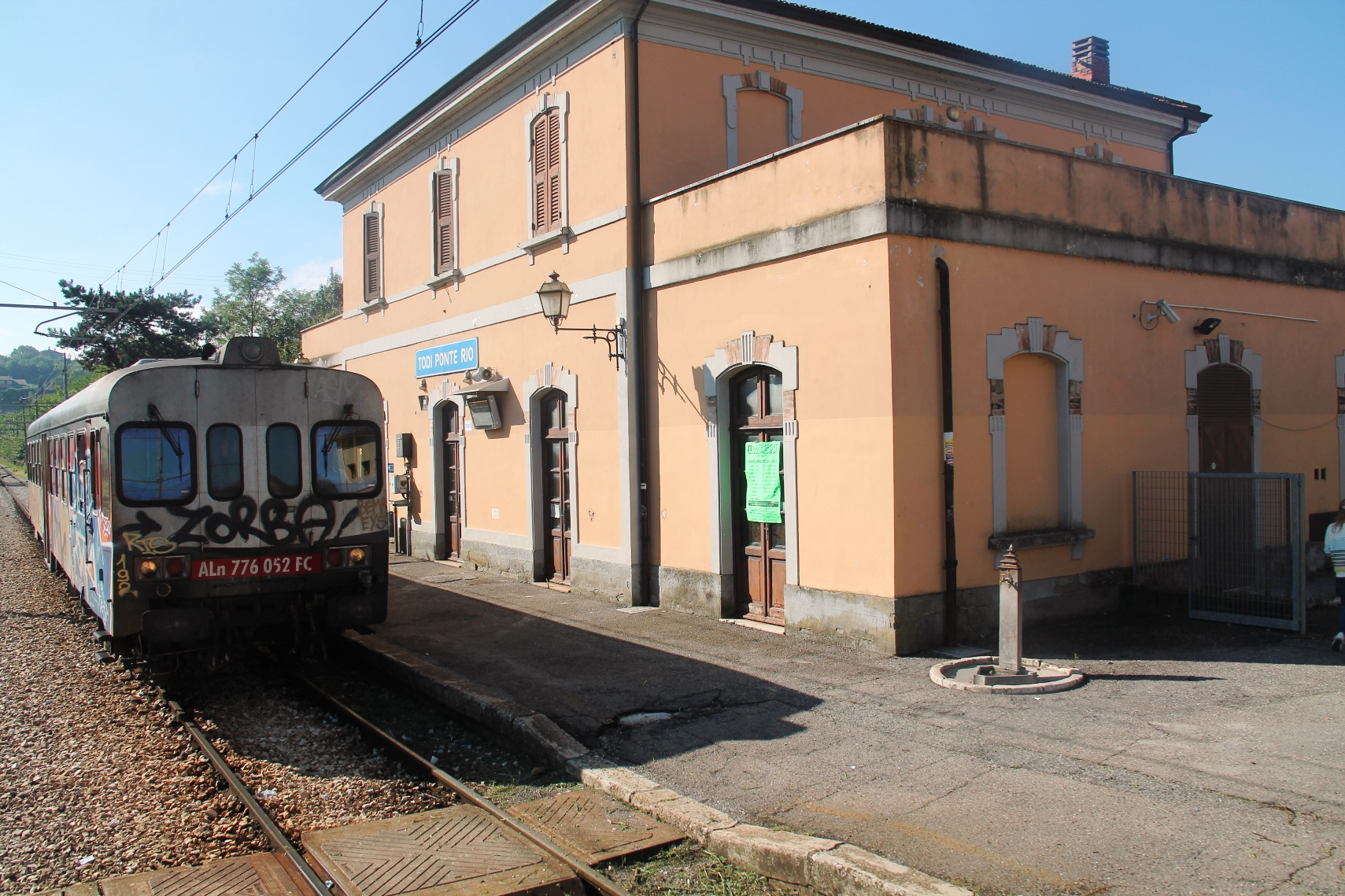
Todi Ponte Rio

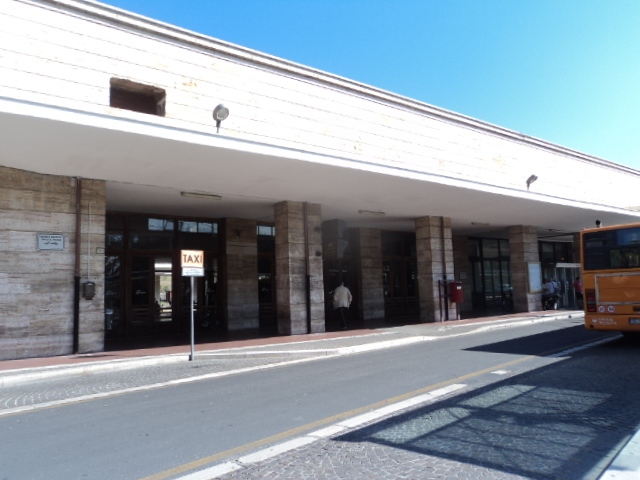
Terni
