= Convent of Sant'Antonio al Monte, Rieti =

Church and convent in Lazio, Italy

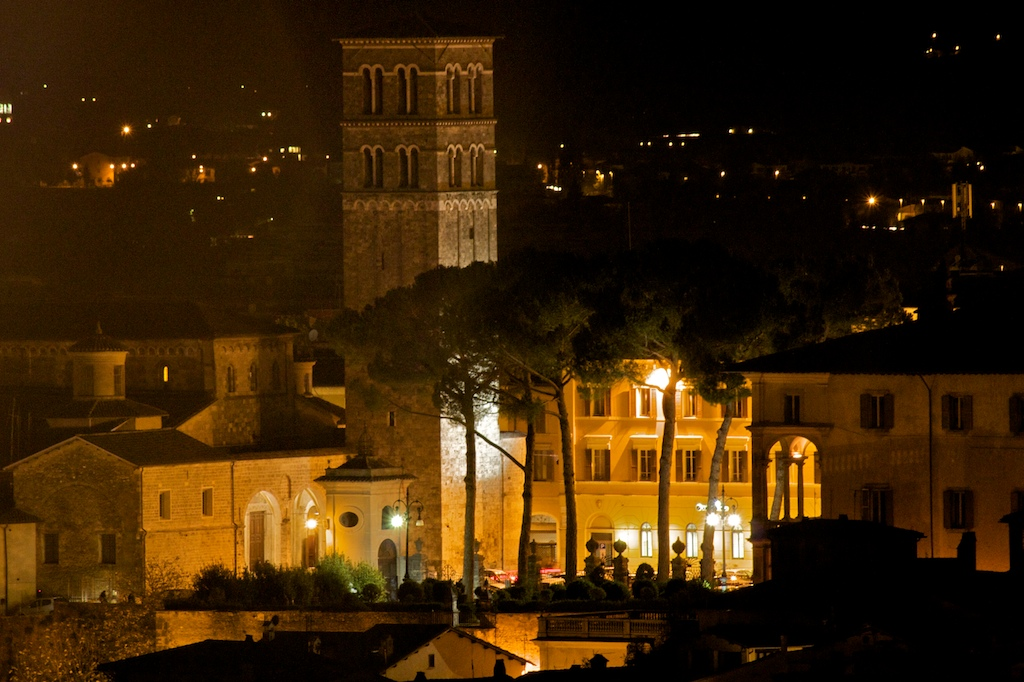
View of the Cathedral from Sant'Antonio al monte - Rieti (Lazio, Italy)

Sant’Antonio al Monte (Italian: St Antony at the Mountain) is a Franciscan church and convent, located just outside the city of Rieti, in the province of Rieti, region of Lazio, Italy.

== History ==
The monastery was founded in 1474, with the approval of Pope Sixtus IV, and funded with donations by the local citizenry. In its origin, the site was adjacent to a hospital and hostel for pilgrims. The friars tended to the ill in a house annexed to the church of San Rufo. The convent had a small church dedicated initially to Santa Maria al Monte, but changed its dedication to St Antony of Padua in the 18th century. The convent once had a notable library, but the institution was suppressed under the Napoleonic rule.

After World War II, the site underwent significant refurbishments. In 2000, when the last friars moved to the larger monastery of Santa Maria delle Grazie a Ponticelli, this convent was converted into a cultural retreat, known as an "Oasi francescana" of Franciscan Oasis, hosting spiritual activities and studies.

The convent can be approached by a path with 18th century aedicules housing a Via Crucis. The terracota panels are modern, completed in 1994 by a student of the Istituto statale d’arte di Rieti "Antonino Calcagnadoro".

The most prominent work that was housed in the convent was a painting depiction the Madonna and Child by Antoniazzo Romano, now on display in the Museo Civico di Rieti, along with illuminated codices once part of the library. The convent has two Renaissance style cloisters. The church contains a wooden crucifix from the 15th century, and a depiction of the Virgin, Magdalen and St John the Evangelist (1652) by Vincenzo Manenti. The oaken sacristy divan was completed by Father Morico da Prossedi in 1692. The bell tower was erected in 1696. Under the main altar are the putative relics of the martyr and saint Vittorio, moved here in 1705.
