= Giovanni Antonio Galli (artist) =

Italian painter

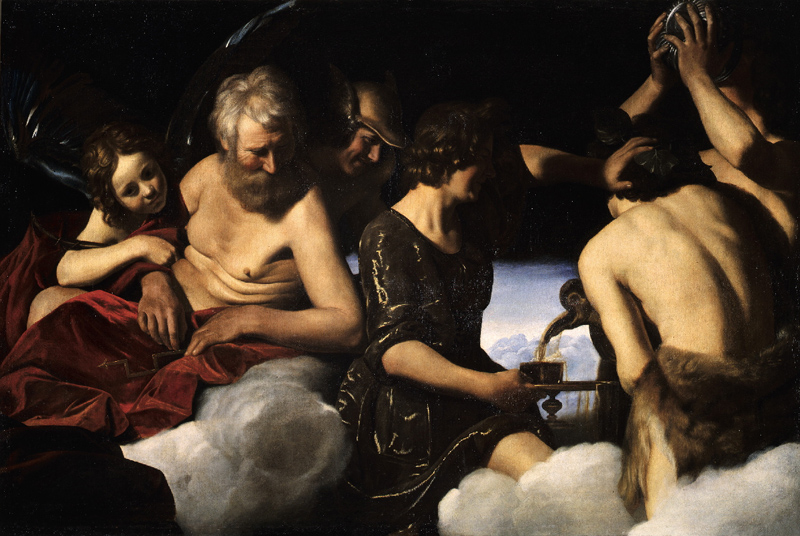
Convito degli Dei, Florence, Uffizi

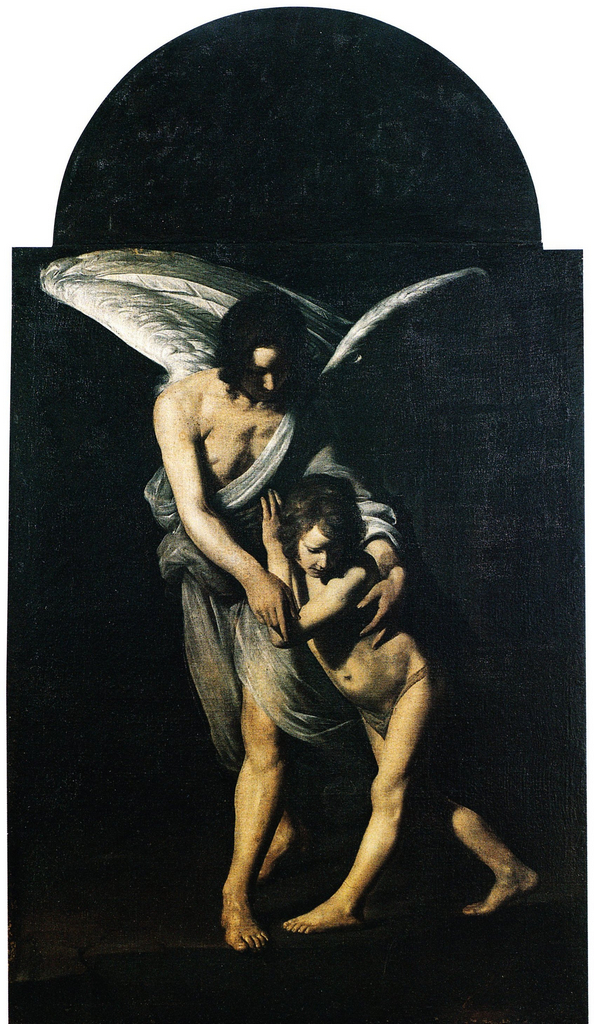
The Guardian Angel, Church of San Rufo, Rieti

Giovanni Antonio Galli, also called lo Spadarino (baptized January 16, 1585 – after June 1651), was an Italian Baroque artist who was a member of the Caravaggisti (followers of Michelangelo Merisi da Caravaggio).

== Life ==
He was born in Rome to a family originally from Florence. His activities are poorly documented but he is known to have been working in Rome in 1597. In 1616 he worked on the decoration of the Sala Regia in the Palazzo del Quirinale with Carlo Saraceni.

He was long confused with his lesser-known brother Giacomo Galli, a gilder, picture framer and artist. In 1943 the art historian Roberto Longhi identified Giovanni Antonio Galli as the painter of a number of works, based on stylistic comparison with The Miracle of Saint Valerie and Saint Martial, the artist's only surviving documented work before the discovery of his frescoes in the Palazzo Madama.

Gianni Papi says that Galli's "most typical and strikingly modern feature is that of human fragility and vulnerability", and that this sets his work apart from that of other Caravaggists. Of the Narcissus (Rome, Palazzo Barberini), which has been attributed variously to Caravaggio, Orazio Gentileschi, Bartolomeo Manfredi, and Galli, Elisabetta Giffi Ponzi says "the quality of lighting, the silky effects of the sleeves and elegiac tone of the work are typical of Spadarino’s style." Ponzi says that Galli's later works, such as the Palazzo Madama frescoes, show a stylistic decline resulting from his ambivalence toward new trends in Roman art.

== Works ==
- Frescoes in the Palazzo Madama, Rome (1638)
- The Miracle of Saint Valerie and Saint Martial (1626–1632; Rome, Saint Peter's Basilica)
- Christ Displaying his Wounds (1625–1635; Perth, Perth Museum and Art Gallery)

After 1943, Roberto Longhi attributed six additional works:

- The Guardian Angel (Rieti, St. Rufo Church)
- Saint Francesca Romana With an Angel, (Genoa, Palazzo Rosso)
- Christ Among the Doctors (Naples, Museo di Capodimonte).
- Saint Anthony and the Christ Child (Rome, Santi Cosma e Damiano)
- Saint Thomas of Villanova Giving Alms (Ancona, Pinacoteca Civica)
- Saint Homobonus and the Beggar (Rome, Vicariato)
