= Quintus Axius =

4th-century BCE Greek queen

Quintus Axius M. f. (or "Quintus Axius, son of Marcus", see filiation) was a man of ancient Rome of the Axia gens who lived in the 1st century BCE. He appears to have been from Reate (modern Rieti). He is included in the list of senators in the senatus consultum de Amphiarai Oropii agris, listed as having been quaestor in either 73 or 74 BCE.

He was an intimate friend of the statesman and writer Cicero and scholar Marcus Terentius Varro, the latter of whom inserted him as one of the speakers in the third book of his de Re Rustica. The 2nd-century CE historian Suetonius quotes from one of Cicero's letters to Axius, and the 2nd-century Roman grammarian Aulus Gellius speaks of a letter which Marcus Tullius Tiro, the freedman of Cicero, wrote to Axius criticizing a speech of Cato the Elder's, On Behalf of the Rhodians.

Axius was a wealthy landowner, and accustomed to lend money, if at least the Axius to whom Cicero talked of applying in 61 BCE, is the same as the above. In 49 BCE, however, we find that Axius was in Cicero's debt. Pliny the Elder tells an anecdote of Axius paying the astronomical sum of 400,000 sestertii for a high-quality donkey. His farm estate, the Roman villa of Quintus Axius, still stands today.
