= San Domenico, Rieti =

Church and adjacent former convent in Lazio, Italy

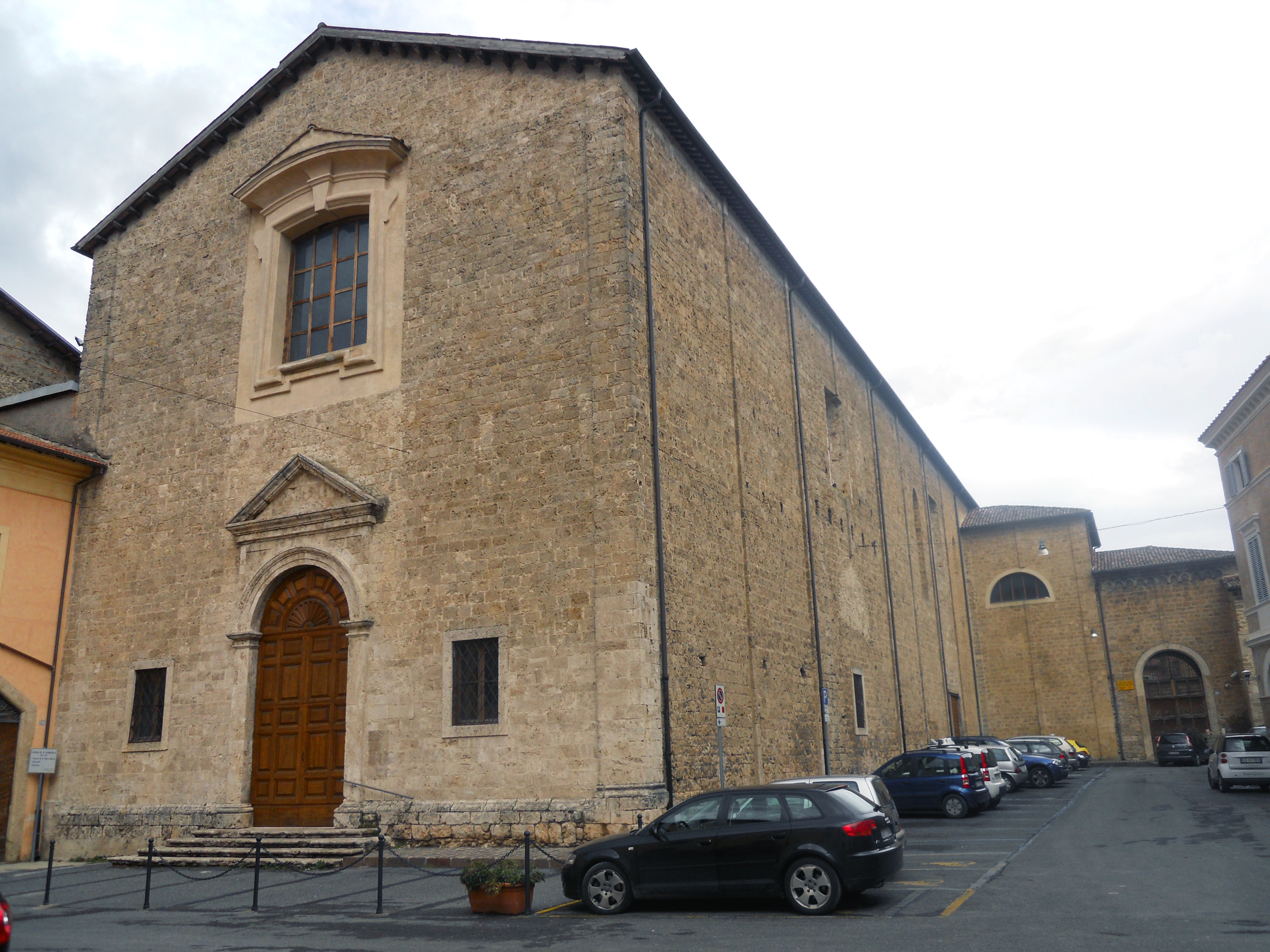
Facade of church

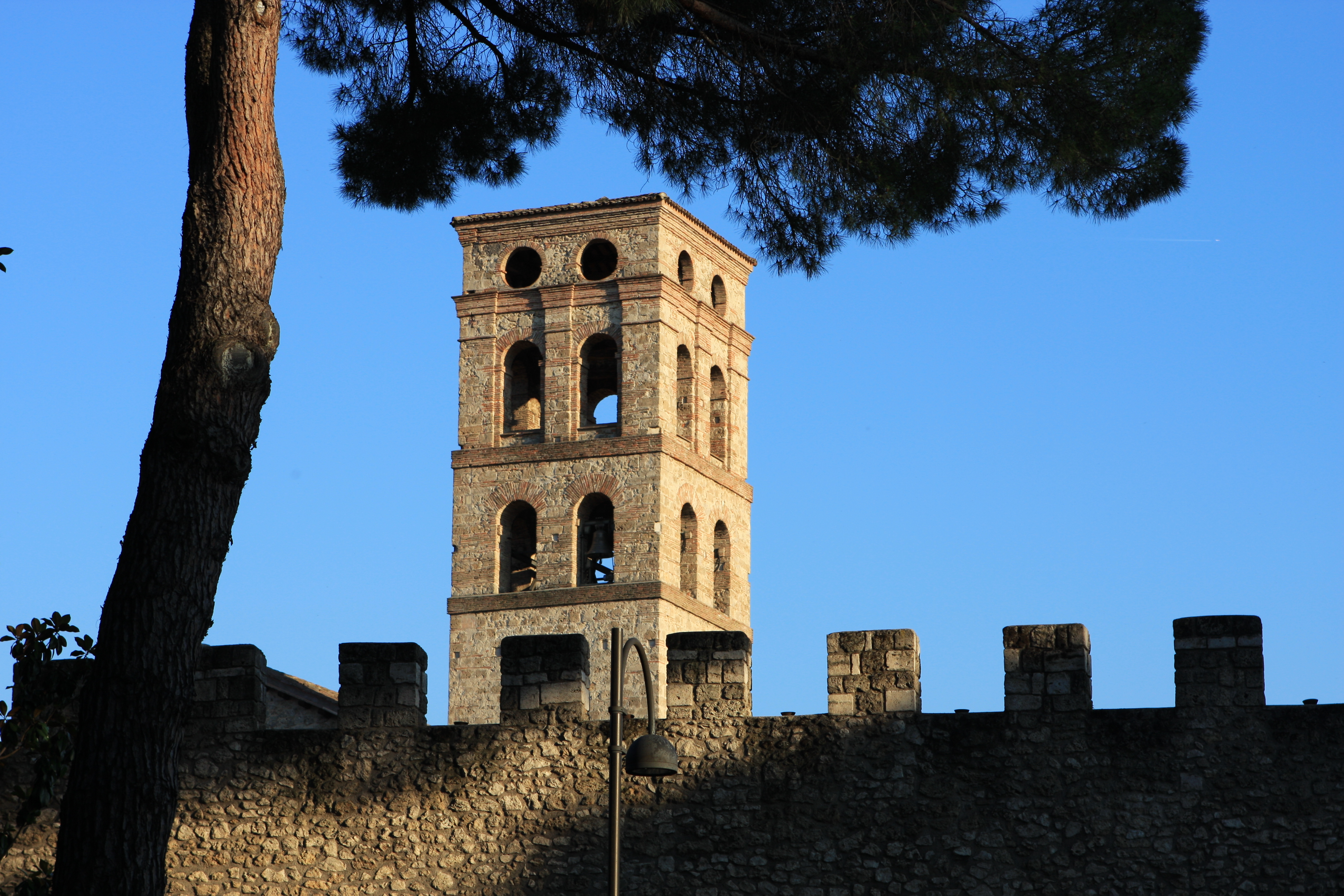
Bell-tower of San Domenico

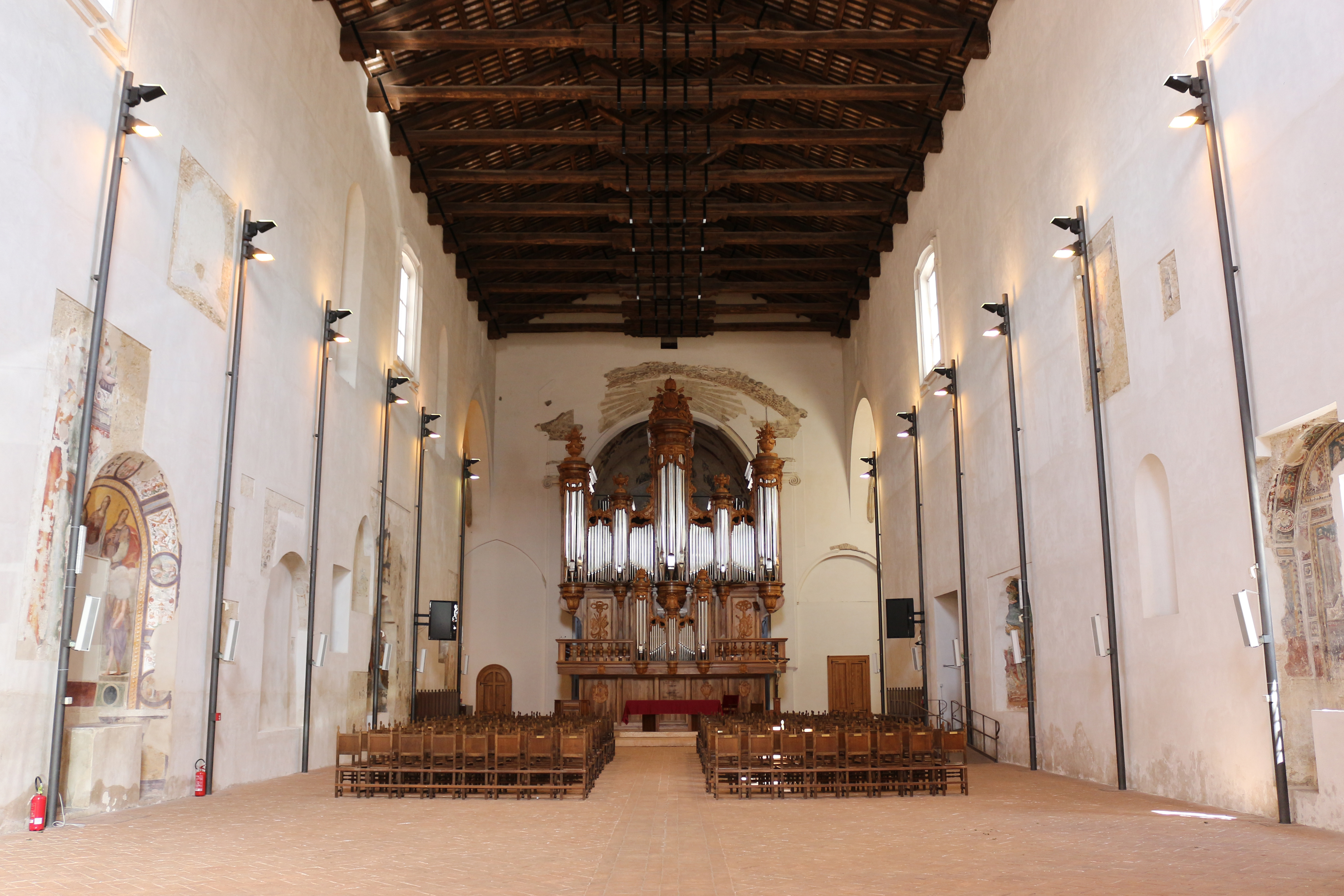
Nave and organ

San Domenico is a Roman Catholic church and the adjacent former Dominican convent is located on the Piazza della Beata Colomba in the medieval center of the city of Rieti, region of Lazio, Italy.

== History ==
Construction was begun in 1242 and completed in 1268; refurbished in 1643-1644. At one time it was endowed with numerous relics and richly decorated. The adjacent convent was linked to the early life of the Blessed Columba of Rieti, after whom the piazza in front of the church is named. The church had a single nave and the facade is built with travertine stone. The Romanesque belltower has a number of bells. It was abandoned in the 18th century, and in 1779, the diocese had proposals to raze the structure and rebuild a new church. The church was suppressed in 1810, but returned after the end of Napoleonic occupation. However again with the establishment of the Italian rule over the Papal states, in 1862 the Dominicans were again expelled, and the convent was used as army barracks. The church was deconsecrated by 1890, and used as a garage or armory.

By 1939, the Bishop of Rieti, Massimo Rinaldi, sought to reconsecrate the building. After the second world war, the commune over the next decades finally committed itself to the slow work of restoration. The earthquake of 1979 caused the roof to collapse, and repairs took decades. The church was reconsecrated in 1994, but restorations not completed until 1999. The sparse interior lacks the numerous side altars, many made with polychrome marble, once decorating the church.

The interior has a number of frescoes, most poorly conserved and some detached and moved to the civic museum. They include:

- Crucifixion (15th-century) by a painter of the Sienese school
- Enthroned Madonna with Saints (1596) by Giovanni Giacomo Pandolci for an altar designed by Dionisio Colonnese
- Madonna with Saints and Putti (1491) by follower of Antoniazzo Romano
- Madonna della Misericordia with God the Father (15th-century) by unknown painter
- Baptism of Christ

Behind the main altar is a monumental organ built from 2004 to 2009 by Barthélemy Formentelli, following 18th century essays by Dom Bédos de Celles (1760) and Roubo le Fils.
