= Axia gens =

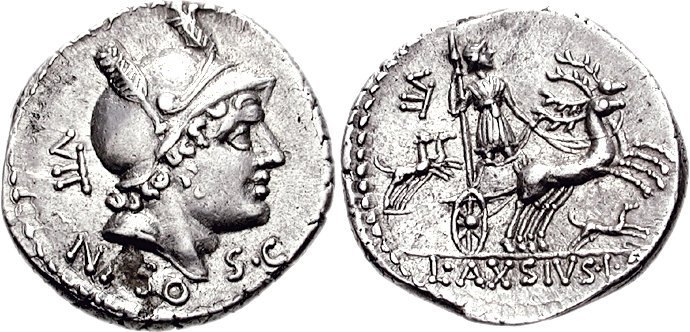
Denarius of Lucius Axius Naso, 71 BC. The obverse depicts Mars, while on the reverse Diana drives a biga pulled by stags, surrounded by her hounds. The Axii probably had a special devotion to the goddess.

The gens Axia, also spelled Axsia, was a plebeian family at Rome during the final century of the Republic and the beginning of the Empire. The gens does not appear to have been particularly large or important, although at least some of the family were reasonably wealthy.

== Branches and cognomina ==
None of the Axii mentioned in history bear a surname; the only cognomen found in inscriptions is Naso, originally referring to someone with a prominent nose.

== Members ==
This list includes abbreviated praenomina. For an explanation of this practice, see filiation.

- Quintus Axius M. f., a senator in 73 BC. He was a wealthy man from Reate, and friend of both Cicero and Varro, who made him a protagonist of his De Re Rustica. His grand villa at modern Colli sul Velino can be seen today.
- Marcus Gallius Axianus, son of Cicero and Varro's friend who was adopted into the Gallia gens.
- Lucius Axius L. f. Naso, triumvir monetalis in 71 BC, probably to be identified with the eques mentioned by Varro, and a banker named in an inscription.
- Lucius Axius L. f. (L. n.) Naso, proconsul in Cyprus in AD 29.
- Quintus Axius Aelianus, governor of the Roman province of Dacia in the 2nd century CE.

== See also ==
- List of Roman gentes

== Bibliography ==
- Marcus Terentius Varro, Rerum Rusticarum (Rural Matters).
- Marcus Tullius Cicero, Epistulae ad Atticum.
- Gaius Suetonius Tranquillus, De Vita Caesarum (Lives of the Caesars, or The Twelve Caesars).
- Aulus Gellius, Noctes Atticae (Attic Nights).
- Joseph Hilarius Eckhel, Doctrina Numorum Veterum (The Study of Ancient Coins, 1792–1798).
- Dictionary of Greek and Roman Biography and Mythology, William Smith, ed., Little, Brown and Company, Boston (1849).
- Theodor Mommsen et alii, Corpus Inscriptionum Latinarum (The Body of Latin Inscriptions, abbreviated CIL), Berlin-Brandenburgische Akademie der Wissenschaften (1853–present).
- Wilhelm Dittenberger, Sylloge Inscriptionum Graecarum (Collection of Greek Inscriptions, abbreviated SIG), Leipzig (1883); Orientis Graeci Inscriptiones Selectae (Select Inscriptions from the Greek East, abbreviated OGIS), Leipzig (1905).
- Paul Du Chaillu, The Viking Age, John Murray, London (1889).
- George Davis Chase, "The Origin of Roman Praenomina", in Harvard Studies in Classical Philology, vol. VIII, pp. 103–184 (1897).
- T. Robert S. Broughton, The Magistrates of the Roman Republic, American Philological Association (1952–1986).
- Michael Crawford, Roman Republican Coinage, Cambridge University Press (1974, 2001).
- Robert C. Knapp, "L. Axius Naso and Pro Legato", in Phoenix, vol. 35, pp. 134–141 (1981).
