= Gallia gens =

Ancient Roman family

The gens Gallia was a plebeian family at ancient Rome. Several members of this gens are mentioned during the first century BC.

== Origin ==
The nomen Gallius might be derived from Gallus, a common surname that can refer either to a cock or someone of Gallic origin.

== Praenomina ==
Among the Gallii we find the praenomina Quintus, Marcus, and Gaius, all of which were common throughout Roman history.

== Branches and cognomina ==
The Gallii do not appear to have been divided into distinct families, and none of those known during the late Republic bore any surnames.

== Members ==
This list includes abbreviated praenomina. For an explanation of this practice, see filiation.

- Quintus Gallius, praetor urbanus in 63 BC, had been accused of ambitus by Marcus Calidius the previous year, and was successfully defended by Cicero. As praetor he presided over the trial of Gaius Cornelius, one of Catiline's conspirators.
- Marcus Gallius, the adoptive father of Axianus, and possibly a brother of Quintus Gallius, the praetor urbanus.
- Marcus Gallius M. f. Axianus, adopted from the Axia gens.
- Marcus Gallius Q. f., praetor in an uncertain year, and a supporter of Marcus Antonius. He adopted the future emperor Tiberius in his youth, and left him a considerable legacy.
- Quintus Gallius Q. f., officer under the proconsul Quintus Marcius Philippus in 47–46 BC. Praetor in 43 BC, he was arrested and put to death by Octavian on the apparently false suspicion of intending to murder him, although Octavian later claimed that Gallius had merely been commended into the care of his brother, and disappeared.
- Gallia Polla, the proprietor of a first-century ousia (Note: Literally, "property"; here an estate that had once belonged to a member of the imperial family.) in Egypt that later passed to the imperial freedman Marcus Antonius Pallas, and after him to Lucius Septimius Severus, (an ancestor of the emperor). She may have been related to Tiberius' adoptive father.
- Gaius Gallius, a person mentioned by Valerius Maximus as having been scourged to death by Sempronius Musca, who caught him in the act of adultery.
- Gaius Gallius C. f. Lupercus, minted copper sestertii in 15 BC.
- Gaius Gallius, the father of Gallia Tertulla.
- Gallia C. f. Tertulla, named in an inscription found at Ravenna, dating to the reigns of Augustus or Tiberius.
- Quintus Gallius Pulcher, archiereus of the Koinon in Ankyra in 35 AD. He probably came from a family that had been granted citizenship by Quintus Gallius the quaestor of Cicily.

== See also ==
- List of Roman gentes

== Bibliography ==
- Marcus Tullius Cicero, Brutus, Epistulae ad Atticum, Epistulae ad Familiares, Philippicae.
- Quintus Tullius Cicero, De Petitione Consulatus (attributed).
- Quintus Asconius Pedianus, Commentarius in Oratio Ciceronis In Toga Candida, Commentarius in Oratio Ciceronis In Cornelio.
- Valerius Maximus, Factorum ac Dictorum Memorabilium (Memorable Facts and Sayings).
- Appianus Alexandrinus (Appian), Bellum Civile (The Civil War).
- Gaius Suetonius Tranquillus (Suetonius), De Vita Caesarum (Lives of the Caesars, or The Twelve Caesars).
- Dictionary of Greek and Roman Biography and Mythology, William Smith, ed., Little, Brown and Company, Boston (1849).
- Broughton, T. Robert S. (1952–1986). The Magistrates of the Roman Republic. American Philological Association.
- Zograf, Aleksandr (1977). The Ancient Coins of the Northern Black Sea Littoral (British Archaeological Reports), ISBN 9780904531879.
- Polska Akademia Nauk. Komitet Nauk o Kulturze Antycznej (1984). Meander: miesie̜cznik poświe̜cony kulturze świata starożytnego. Vol. 39. Państwowe Wydawn. Naukowe.
- Shackleton Bailey, David Roy (1991). Two Studies in Roman Nomenclature. Scholars Press. ISBN 9781555406660.
- Derks, Ton; Roymans, Nico (2009). Ethnic Constructs in Antiquity: The Role of Power and Tradition. Amsterdam archaeological studies. Vol. 13 (illustrated ed.). Amsterdam University Press. ISBN 9789089640789.
- Rossi, Lucia (2014). "Romans and Land Property Rights in Ptolemaic Egypt: The Identification of Lucius Septimius". Ancient Society. 44. JSTOR 44079989.
- Nuorluoto, Tuomo (26 February 2021). "Roman Female Cognomina: Studies in the Nomenclature of Roman Women" (PDF). Uppsala Universitet, Department of Linguistics and Philology. ISBN 978-91-506-2858-6.
- Broux, Yanne (2021), SB 10. 10527 (TM 14312) and the Sale of Ousiac Land in Egypt
