= Museo Civico di Rieti =

Museum in Rieti, Lazio, Italy

Coordinates: 42.4028°N 12.8610°E

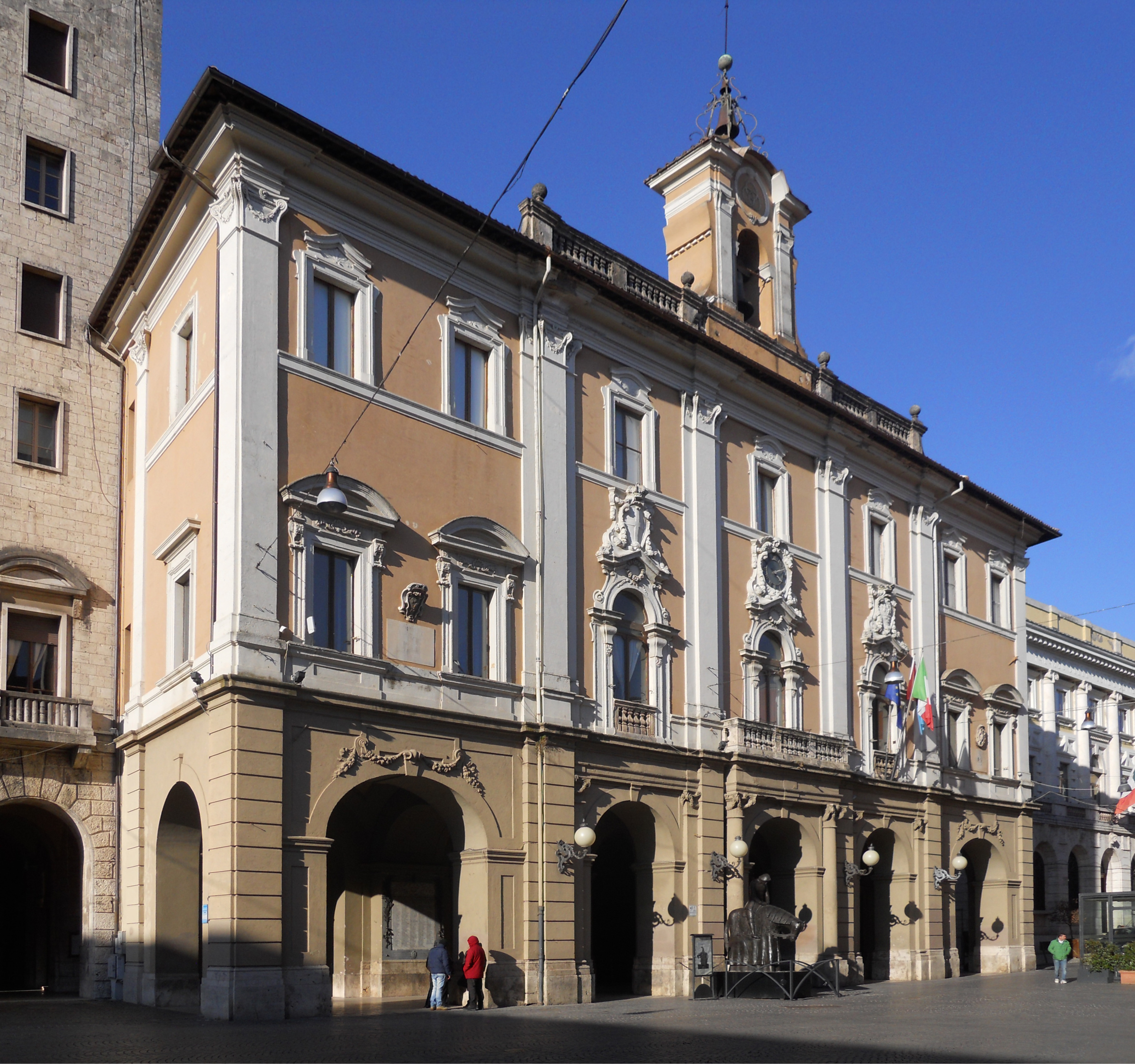
Facade of the Town Hall - Rieti

The Museo Civico di Rieti is the town art and archeology museum located in the Palazzo Comunale or former town hall of Rieti in the region of Lazio, Italy. The painting and art section is located at Piazza Vittorio Emanuele II #1, and the archeologic section at Via S. Anna #4.

== History ==
The impetus for the museum arose in the 19th century and centered around the ancient inscriptions that had been collected in the town hall. After the suppression of many of the religious institutions, the collection was enriched with many works of art, exhibited since 1865 in the halls of the Convent of Sant'Agostino of Rieti. From 1909, they were exhibited in the town hall. The collection includes works of art from Zanino di Pietro, Luca di Tommè, Antoniazzo Romano, and Antonino Calcagnadoro. In addition, there is a large local archeological collection.
