= Marcus Calidius =

Marcus Calidius (fl. 64–47 BC) was a Roman politician and orator.

Jerome, in his Chronicon under the year 64 BC, notes that Calidius studied oratory under Apollodorus of Pergamum. He was one of the earliest Atticists in Rome. In 64, he prosecuted Quintus Gallius for ambitus, even accusing Gallius, who was defended by Cicero, of trying to poison him. Gallius was acquitted. As a praetor in 57, he helped Cicero return from exile and recover his house. This was probably the occasion on which he delivered his speech De domo Ciceronis, cited by Quintilian in his Institutio Oratoria.

In 52, Calidius defended Titus Annius Milo for the murder of Clodius Pulcher. He was twice an unsuccessful candidate for the consulship, in 51–50 or 50–49. After his first failed candidacy, he unsuccessfully prosecuted one of the winners, Gaius Claudius Marcellus. He was himself prosecuted for ambitus in 51 by two Gallii, perhaps sons of Quintus Gallius.

At the start of the civil war in 49, Calidius sided with Julius Caesar. He spoke eloquently in favour of Caesar and against Pompey on the floor of the Senate, arguing that the latter should leave Rome with his troops for his own province. In his Commentary on the Civil War, Caesar recounts how he appointed him governor of Cisalpine Gaul that same year. He probably held the title of legate. He died in Gaul at Placentia in 48 or 47.

Calidius had a high reputation as an orator. Cicero, in a letter to Brutus, expresses dislike of him but admiration for his oratory skill. In the Middle Ages, he received a one-sentence entry in the Lives and Manners of the Philosophers, describing him as an "orator [who] flourished in the time of Pompey".
