= Santa Chiara, Rieti =

Former church and convent in Rieti, Lazio, Italy

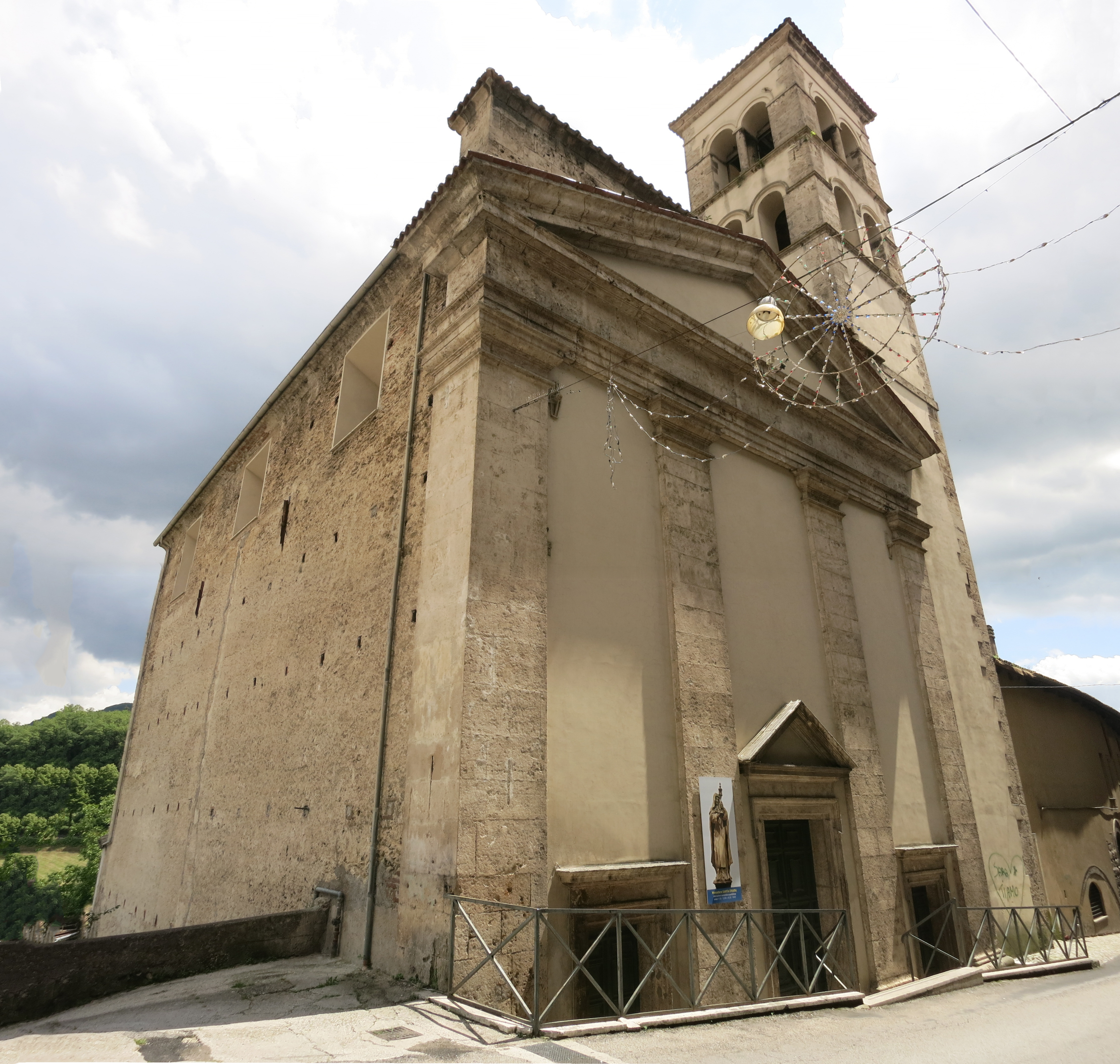
Facade of church

Santa Chiara is a former Roman Catholic church and convent in the city of Rieti, province of Rieti, region of Lazio, Italy.

== History ==
In 1229, Pope Nicholas IV while visiting Rieti, granted the house of the blessed Angelo Tancredi of Rieti, a companion of St Francis of Assisi, to four women who wished to live as nuns under the Franciscan rule. In time, these nuns gained further patronage and donations and were able to build next to their house a small church dedicated to San Stefano. In these restricted quarters, the order continued to gain adherents. In 1566, an aristocrat from the town of Casperia, doctor Paolo Buonamici, endowed the nun's convent with 36 thousand scudi. Buonamici's daughter and granddaughter were among the nuns. This endowment allowed for the erection of the present church, begun in 1567 and completed in 1594. The church while formally dedicated to St Clare, it was also referred to as San Stefano.

In 1572, under Pope Gregory XIII, the nuns in Rieti entered a cloistered rule of the second order of Poor Clares. The Clarissan convent functioned until 1860, when it was suppressed. however, nuns were able to remain lodged here even well into the 20th-century. In 1870 the buildings were transferred to the City. In 1924 the nuns converted part of the convent for use as a school, while the church remained property of the provincial Fondo Edifici di Culto (FEC).

The facade has a formal Renaissance classicism. The bell-tower has mullioned windows. Presently the church is closed. Behind the main altar is a baroque organ.
