= Roman villa of Quintus Axius =

Roman patrician villa

Coordinates: 42.492382°N 12.811493°E

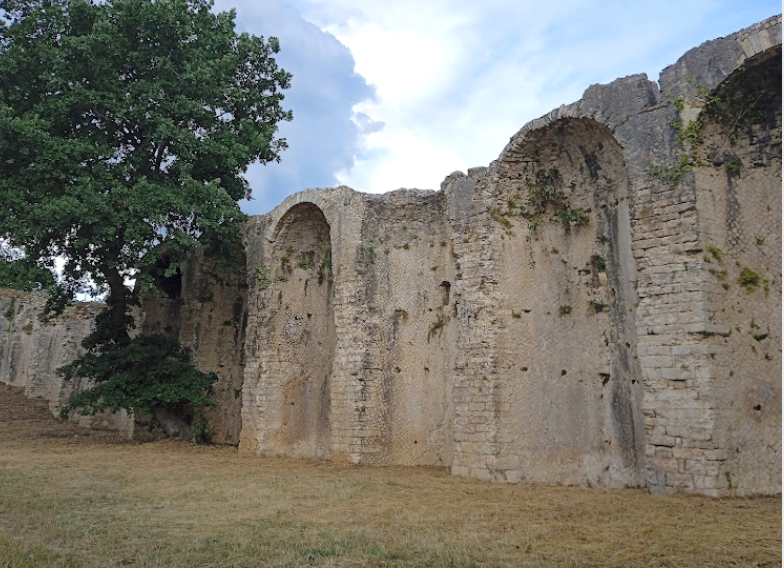
Cryptoporticus, villa of Quintus Axius

The ancient Roman villa of Quintus Axius was a large rural villa rustica in the locality of Grotte di San Nicola, Colli sul Velino (Rieti, Lazio), Italy.

It is one of the relatively few known farm-estates of ancient Roman Italy, especially of those that can be assigned to a known senator of the Axia gens family, friend of Varro and Cicero who wrote about his visit there.

== Background ==
In the third century BC the Romans had conquered Sabina and incorporated it into the nascent Roman state. From the 2nd century BC the landscape of the region saw the abandonment of the ancient Samnite residential areas and the construction of imposing villae rusticae, farm-villas that changed the territorial structure. They were equipped with a residential part (villa) and a farm (housing for the workforce, production facilities and warehouses). The landowners no longer lived in these properties all year, but spent their holidays there with many of the comforts of city life. Roman aristocrats often owned several of these villas in Italy, and visited each over the year to check on business and also to enjoy hunting, reading, writing and the rural life. The farms on these estates typically produced lucrative crops that were sold to the cities including olives, grapes (for wine), and even game or other edible luxuries such as snails, fish, and small birds.

== Location ==
The villa of Axius was "on the bend of the river Velinus" and must have been near the shores of Lake Velino before it was drained.

The site is located at the foot of Monte Castagneto on the slope called "Promontoro", at Ponte Sant’Angelo sul Fiumarone, below the SS79 road.

== Description ==
The villa of Quintus Axius dates most likely to the 1st century BC.

Axius was a senator and businessman and friend of the writer Varro who mentions him in a dialogue with Appius Claudius during which their villas are compared.

Axius had two villas in the area: this one "at Reate (Rieti)" which Appius described as "elaborate" with "citrus wood or gold, with vermillion and azure, and any coloured or mosaic work", yet "never a painter or fresco-worker has seen" as it was more important as a bird-farming estate, and where he had stayed and feasted on exotic birds. Axius was keen to know more from his friends about animal and bird husbandry and how to increase his profits from farming. The other more luxurious villa was in the Rosea (unknown location).

Other information on the villa comes from another friend of Axius, Cicero, the orator who, in 54 BC, was called to defend the nearby city of Reate in one of the countless lawsuits brought against them by the citizens of Interamna Nahars (now Terni) regarding the diatribe over the “Marmore issue”. To remove that threat of malaria to Reate, the Roman consul Manius Curius Dentatus had ordered the construction in 271 BC of a canal (the Curiano Trench) to divert the water from the marshes in the Rieti Valley and from Lake Velino over the natural cliff at Marmore, creating the waterfall, the tallest man-made one in the world. The imposing work expanded the farmland in the Rieti basin, but caused flooding in the valley below. This became the cause of interminable quarrels between Reate and Terni. Cicero was therefore able to visit the villa of Axius in 54 BC and visited the Septem Aquae springs. The resulting lawsuit led by Cicero against the Terni had a positive outcome, as the Reate citizens erected his statue in the forum (which, in the early 1900s, was placed in the municipal museum).

=== The villa buildings ===
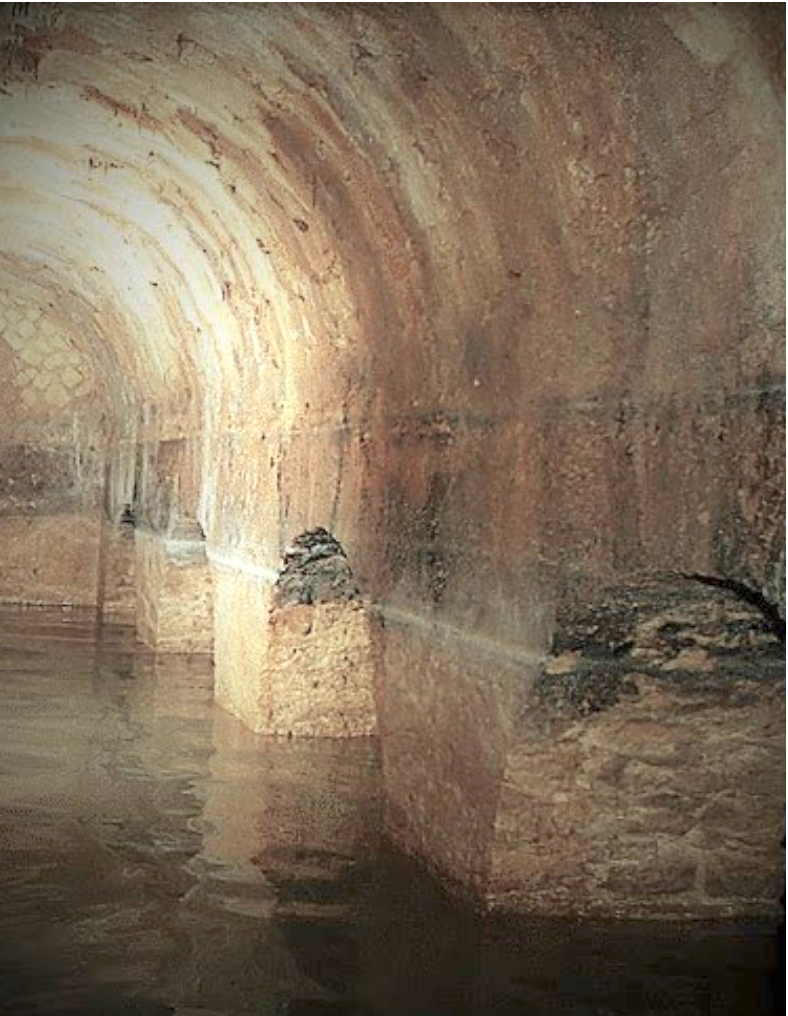
Cistern, villa of Quintus Axius

The high cryptoporticus wall of about 100 m length in polygonal stone work has seven imposing niches, behind which is a cistern of about 6 x 9 m supported by eight pillars and still containing water. On the upstream side, some openings captured water of the nearby spring, while channels exit towards a basin or fountain. The cistern is still in use.

The general layout of the rooms, divided between pars dominica (masters part) and pars rustica (farm), and the description of the residential area with refined decorations in gold and turquoise on the walls and mosaic floors, is known from the story of Varro.

An opus sectile floor was added in the 3rd century, and the amount of pottery recovered for the 3rd and 4th centuries was greater than for earlier phases, and included both imported and locally produced types, such as African red slipware and Adriatic terra sigillata. This showed that the villa was still economically 'active' and also that it was used, as before, as a residence by its owner.

A survey in the surrounding land led to the identification of a series of ancient hypogea, which probably were related to structures of the villa and which must have given rise to the toponym “Grotte di San Nicola”.

== Discovery ==
Ippolito Tabulazzi, in the 17th century, tells of important archaeological finds at the villa. The villa was next mentioned in 1872, when there was a report of its ruins. In 1902, during some groundwork, coins, bricks and a rainwater cistern were found in the area near the remains of the villa described by Tosti.
