= San Rufo, Rieti =

Church building in Rieti, Italy

Coordinates: 42°24′08″N 12°51′43″E

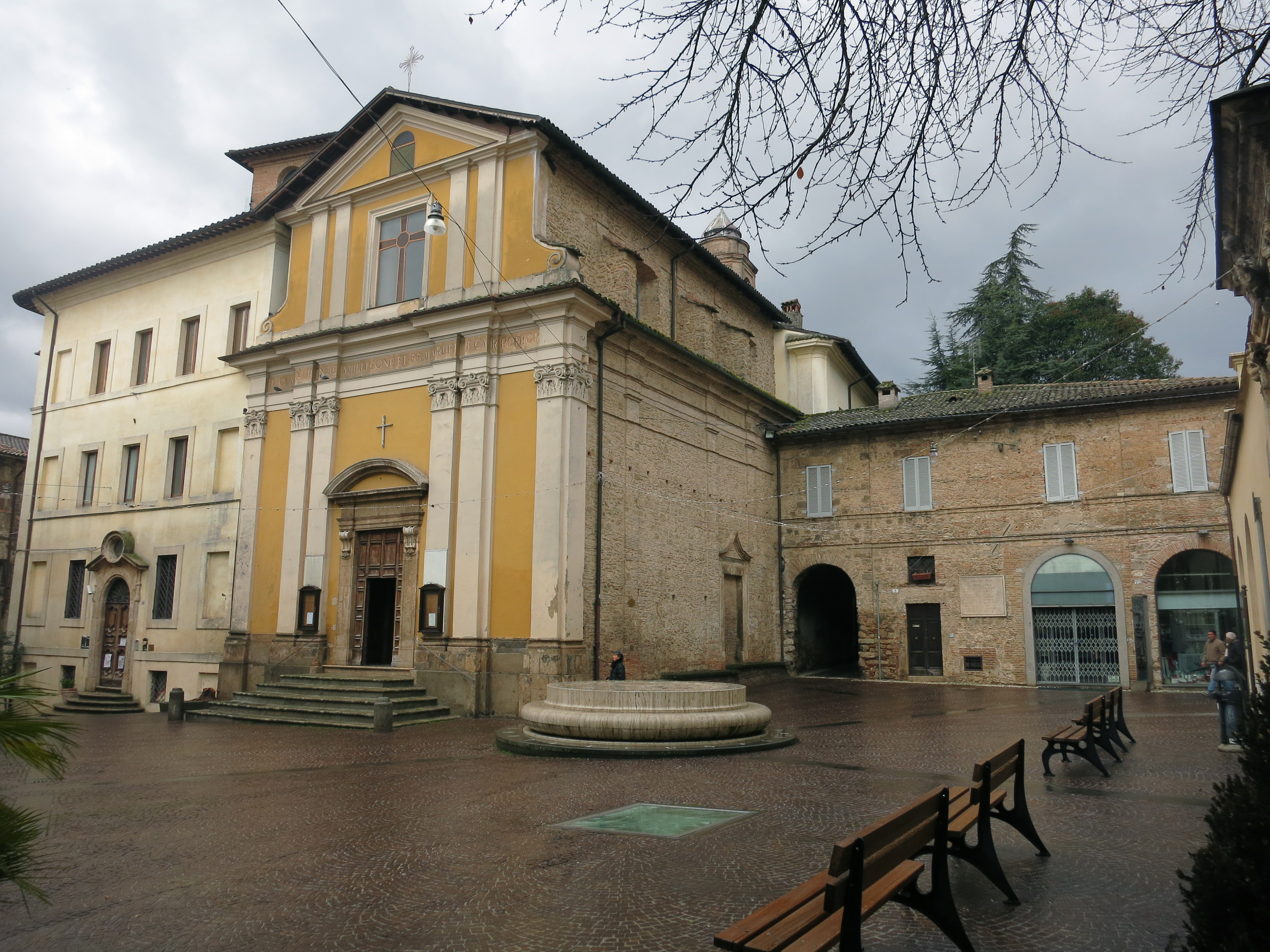
Church and plazza of San Rufo

San Rufo is a Baroque-style Roman Catholic church located in the town of Rieti, region of Lazio, Italy. The piazza in front of the church is said to be the geographic center of Italy.

== History ==
Documents recall a church of San Rufo as early as 1141. But by 1574, documents indicate that it had fallen into ruin and deconsecrated. A lay confraternity (della Pietà) continued to use the church for services. In 1747, the parish was conceded to a Congregation of Clerics regular, and they patronized the reconstruction of the church by 1748 under designs of Melchiorre Passalacqua, and was consecrated in 1760 by Bishop Gaetano De Carli, and dedicated to Saints Ruffo, Carpoforo Martyr, and Camillo De Lellis.

While the exterior is simple, the interior has a rich baroque decoration. Among the works, is the first altarpiece on the left, depicting the Guardian Angel, once attributed to Caravaggio, but since 1943 attributed to Giovanni Antonio Galli. The main altarpiece depicts the Ecstasy of St Camillo de Lellis, painted by Pierre Subleyras. Other altarpieces of the side chapels depict the Apparition of the Sacred Heart of Jesus to Saint Margherita Maria Alacoque (1936) in the 2nd altar on the left. The second altar on the right has a Madonna della Salute with the child Jesus, St Anne, and St Joseph by Giacomo Conti.

The organ in the counterfacade was installed in the 18th century.
