= Sanctuary of Fonte Colombo =

Monastery in Rieti, Italy

The Sanctuary of Fonte Colombo, or Santuario di Fonte Colombo is one of a local cluster of four sanctuary-monasteries, originally based on rural oratories founded in the Rieti Valley by Francis of Assisi in the Rieti valley, province of Rieti, region of Lazio, Italy. This sanctuary is located on the slopes of Monte Rainiero, and near the town of Contigliano.

In 1223, Francis of Assisi occupied a hermit cave, the Sacro Speco, located along the stream below the present monastery. It is there, alongside his companion, Brother Leo, that he composed the second rule of the Franciscan order. This one was accepted by Pope Honorious III. Tradition holds that Francis first acquired the stigmata while at Fonte Colombo. Putatively Frances renamed the site "fountain of the doves" or Fonte Colombo when he saw doves drinking in the stream. The church in the monastery was consecrated in 1450.
