= Rieti =

- Comune
- Comune di Rieti
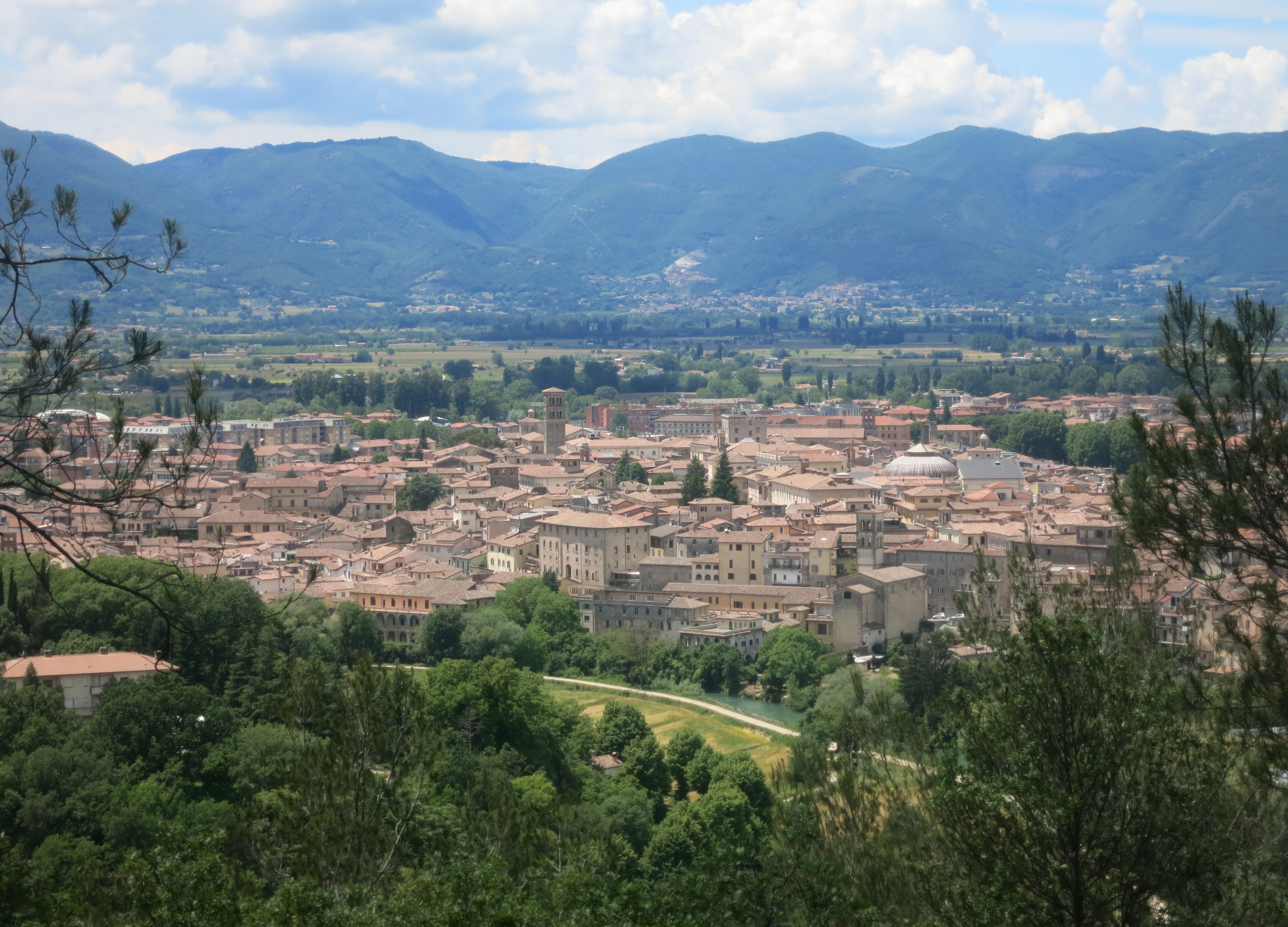
- The city centre of Rieti as seen from San Mauro hill, east of the city. In the background, the Rieti valley enclosed by the Sabine mountains; in the foreground, the Velino river.

- Flag Coat of arms

- Location within Italy Location within Lazio
- Coordinates: 42°24′N 12°52′E
- Country: Italy
- Region: Lazio
- Province: Rieti (RI)
- Frazioni: Case San Benedetto, Casette, Castelfranco, Cerchiara, Chiesa Nuova, Cupaello, Lisciano, Lugnano, Maglianello, Moggio, Piane di Poggio Fidoni, Piani di Sant'Elia, Piè di Moggio, Poggio Fidoni, Poggio Perugino, San Giovanni Reatino, Sant'Elia, Vaiano, Vazia

Government
  - Mayor: Daniele Sinibaldi (Fdl)

Area
  - Total: 206.52 km^{2} (79.74 sq mi)
- Elevation: 405 m (1,329 ft)

Population (30 April 2008)
  - Total: 47,745
  - Density: 231.19/km^{2} (598.77/sq mi)
- Demonym: Reatini
- Time zone: UTC+1 (CET)
  - Summer (DST): UTC+2 (CEST)
- Postal code: 02100
- Dialing code: 0746
- Patron saint: St. Barbara
- Saint day: December 4
- Website: Official website

Rieti (Italian: [ˈrjɛːti]; Latin: Reate, Sabino: Riete) is a town and comune in Lazio, central Italy, with a population of 47,700. It is the administrative seat of the province of Rieti and see of the diocese of Rieti, as well as the modern capital of the Sabina region.

The town centre stands on a small hilltop, commanding from the southern edge the wide Rieti valley, at the bottom of the Sabine hills and of monti Reatini, including mount Terminillo. The plain was once a large lake, drained by the ancient Romans, and is now the fertile basin of the Velino River. Only the small Ripasottile and Lungo lakes remain of the larger original.

== History ==
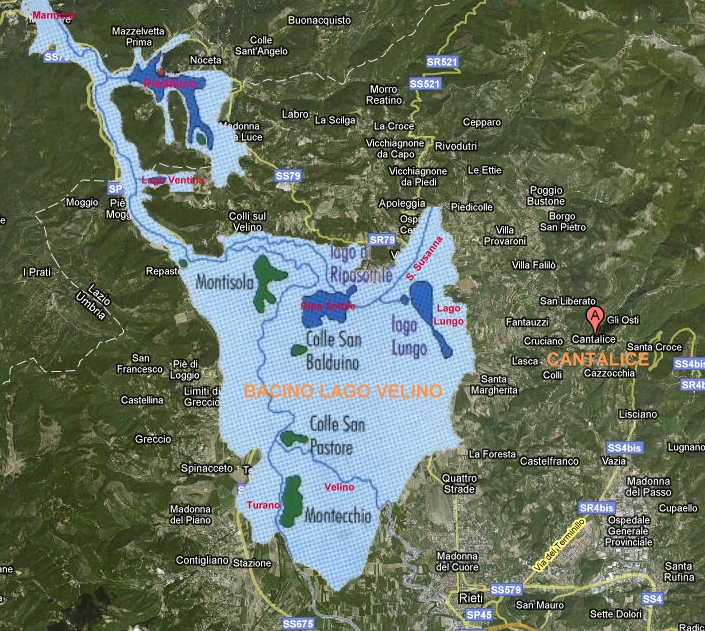
Map showing the extension of the ancient lake which once occupied the Rieti valley; modern-day rivers and lakes are shown in darker blue

=== Prehistory ===
According to the legend, Reate was founded by Rea, a divinity (that would be the origin of the town name). It was founded at the beginning of the Iron Age (9th–8th century BC).

Probably in earlier times the lands around Rieti were inhabited by Umbri, then by Aborigines and later on by Sabines, who reached the lands sited in the nearby of Tevere river.

=== Ancient era ===
Reate was originally a major site of the Sabine nation well before the foundation of Rome. According to the legend, when Romulus founded Rome, Romans kidnapped Sabine women in order to populate the town (The Rape of the Sabine Women) and this led to a war between Romans and Sabines. The battle of the Lacus Curtius came to an end only when the women threw themselves between the armies, begging the men who were by then their relatives to stop fighting. Romulus and Titus Tatius relented and a collaboration between the two people started. According to an account more based on history, Sabines settled on the Quirinale because of their continuous need for grazing-lands.

After the final Roman conquest, carried out by Manius Curius Dentatus in the early third century BC (290 BC), the village became a strategic point in the early Italian road network, dominating the "salt" track (Via Salaria) that linked Rome to the Adriatic Sea through the Apennines. Many lands of Reate and Amiternum were confiscated and allocated to Romans. From the outset, Sabines were offered Roman citizenship but without voting rights, until 268 BC in which they gained full citizenship, and were incorporated into two new tribes (Velina and Quirina).

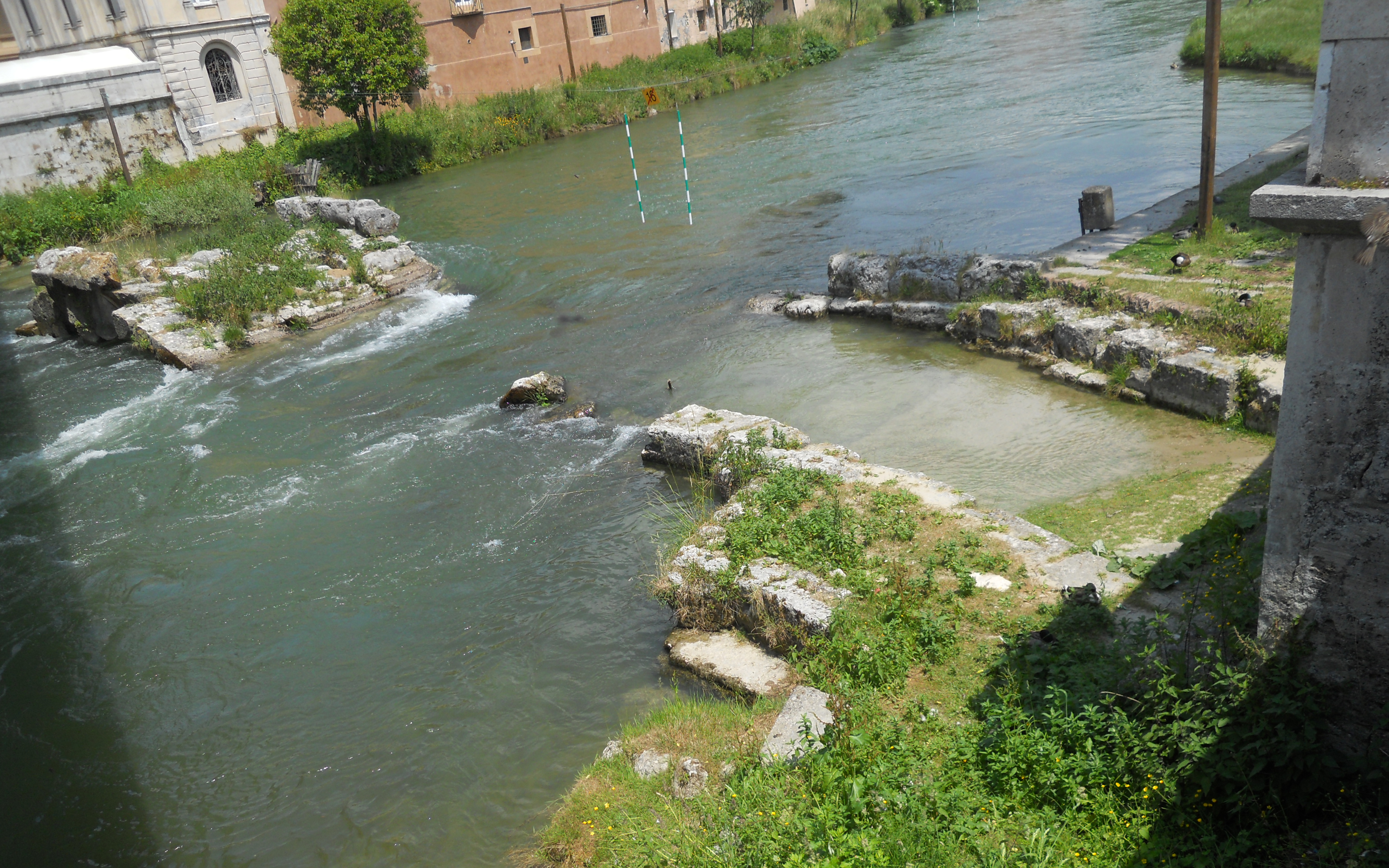
Remains of the Roman bridge (3rd century BC)

Curius Dentatus drained a large portion of the lake by diverting the Velino river into the Nera (thus giving birth to Marmore Falls). The wide area once occupied by the lake turned into a fertile plain (the Rieti Valley). Following Roman customs, the land was split into characteristic square allotments. The town itself underwent significant development, being re-organised according to typical Roman urban standards (e.g., two crossed roads make up the settlement's backbone), and was fortified with strong walls. A stone bridge was laid across the Velino river, and a large viaduct was built to bring goods from the Via Salaria directly to Rieti's southern gate.

Roman Reate receives a number of mentions in Latin literature, thanks to its flourishing soil, its valued assets, and some peculiarities of the surroundings (such as wandering islands and hollow-subsurfaced fields). Cicero, for instance, describes the tensions between Reate and Interamna (Terni) following the lake drainage, and refers to the country house (villa) that his friend Q. Axius owned in the plain.

One of the most important Sabine families that gained success in Rome was the Gens Flavia, from which Emperor Titus Flavius Vespasianus (who started the building of the Colosseum, also known as the Amphitheatrum Flavium) descended.

The Reatin poet and writer Marcus Terentius Varro was born in 116 BC and he is usually referred to as the father of Roman erudition.

=== Middle Ages ===
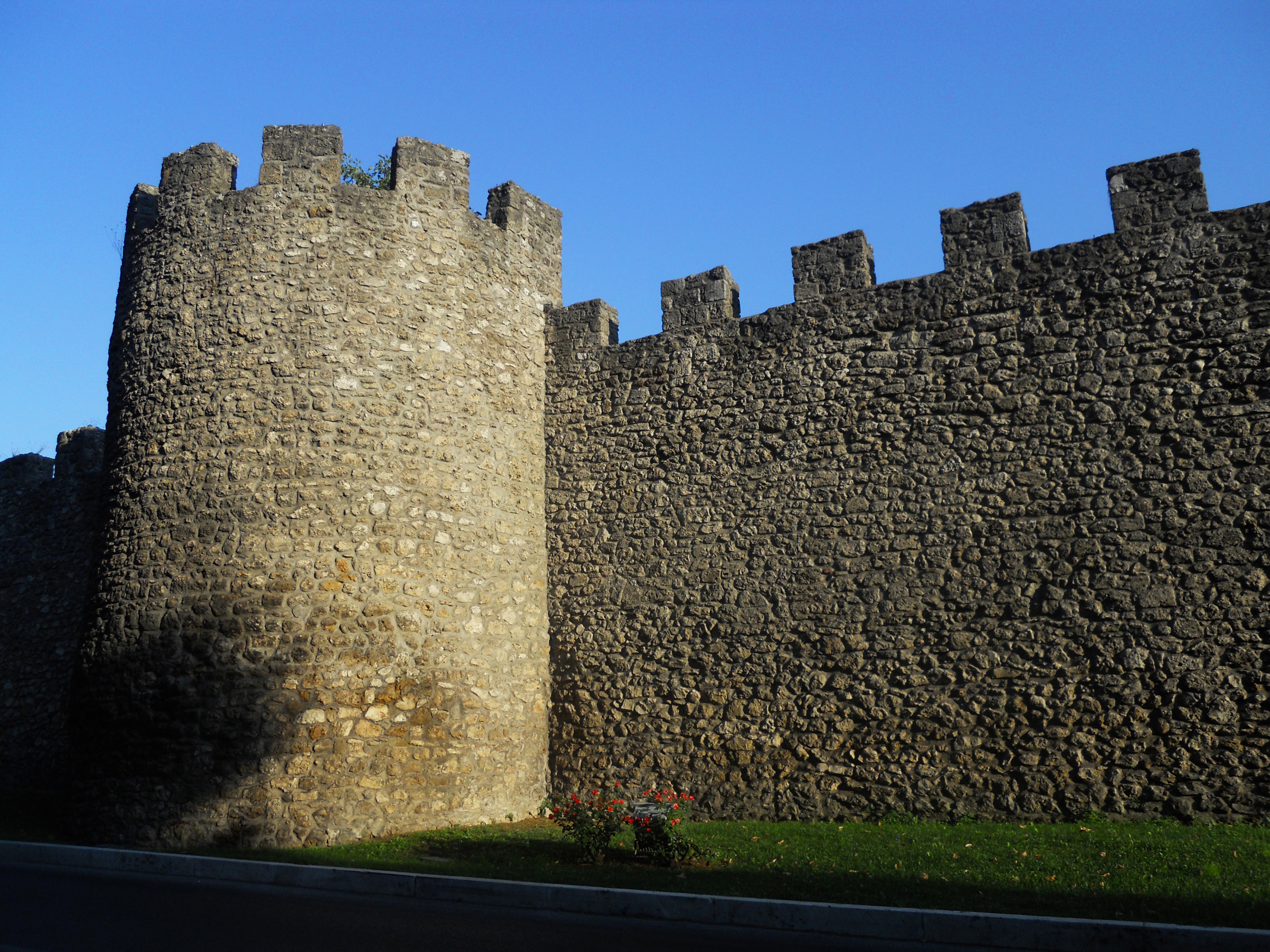
The medieval walls

After the fall of the Western Roman Empire, Rieti suffered destruction by Barbarians, but never ceased to be an important gastaldate during the Lombard domination, as part of the Duchy of Spoleto. Under the Franks, it was the county capital. It was sacked by the Saracens in the ninth and tenth centuries and by the Norman king Roger II of Sicily in 1149.

The city was rebuilt with the help of the Roman comune, and from 1198 was also a free commune, of Guelph orientation, with a podestà of its own.

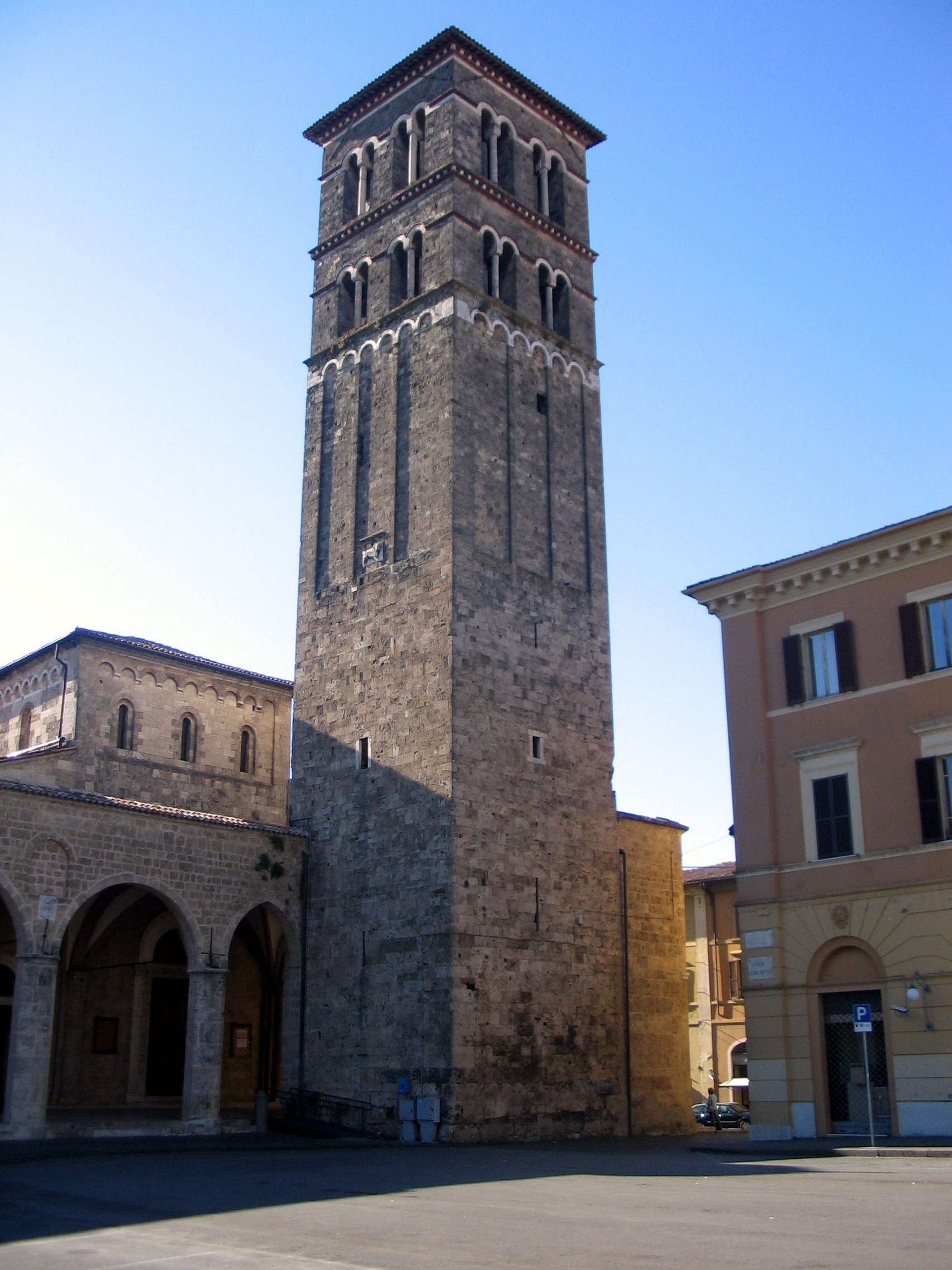
Bell tower of St. Mary Cathedral

As a favourite Papal seat, Rieti was the place of important historical events: proxy Emperor Henry VI married Constance of Hauteville here (1185). Charles I of Anjou was crowned King of Apulia, Sicily and Jerusalem by Pope Nicholas IV in 1289. Pope Gregory IX canonized St. Dominic in Rieti (1234).

Moses ben Isaac of Rieti (1388–1467) was a Jewish scholar and physician who authored a two-part Dantean poem known for its wealth of literary-biographical information, and especially as a primary source for the Shalshelet haQabbalah of Gedalya ibn Yihya. This poem was published as Sefer Miqdash Meat by Jacob Goldenthal (Vienna 1851).

=== Late Middle Ages and modern era ===
After the Papal seat had been moved to Avignon, Rieti was conquered by the King of Naples, while inner struggles between Guelphs and Ghibellines broke out. In 1354 it was won back by Cardinal Albornoz, and it later became a feudal seigneury of the Alfani family within the Papal States. More of the surrounding plain was drained in the following century, but this led to confrontation with the neighboring Terni.

Rieti was province capital of the Papal States from 1816 to 1860. In 1821 the Battle of Rieti between Austrian forces and southern Italian rebels was fought just outside the city at Antrodoco. After the unification of Italy, it was initially part of Umbria, being annexed to Lazio in 1923. It became the provincial capital on January 2, 1927.

== Climate ==
Rieti has a humid subtropical climate (Köppen climate classification: Cfa), bordering on a hot-summer mediterranean climate (Köppen climate classification: Csa) with cool winters and hot summers, and plentiful precipitation throughout most of the year with a relative drying trend around mid-summer.

Climate data for Rieti (1991–2020)
Month	Jan	Feb	Mar	Apr	May	Jun	Jul	Aug	Sep	Oct	Nov	Dec	Year
Mean daily maximum °C (°F)	9.3 (48.7)	10.9 (51.6)	14.6 (58.3)	18.0 (64.4)	22.4 (72.3)	27.1 (80.8)	30.5 (86.9)	30.6 (87.1)	24.9 (76.8)	20.0 (68.0)	14.1 (57.4)	9.6 (49.3)	19.3 (66.8)
Daily mean °C (°F)	5.2 (41.4)	5.9 (42.6)	9.1 (48.4)	12.4 (54.3)	16.4 (61.5)	20.6 (69.1)	23.2 (73.8)	23.4 (74.1)	18.9 (66.0)	14.5 (58.1)	10.2 (50.4)	6.0 (42.8)	13.8 (56.9)
Mean daily minimum °C (°F)	1.2 (34.2)	0.8 (33.4)	3.6 (38.5)	6.8 (44.2)	10.4 (50.7)	14.1 (57.4)	16.0 (60.8)	16.2 (61.2)	12.8 (55.0)	9.0 (48.2)	6.2 (43.2)	2.3 (36.1)	8.3 (46.9)
Average precipitation mm (inches)	113 (4.4)	108 (4.3)	91 (3.6)	102 (4.0)	78 (3.1)	70 (2.8)	35 (1.4)	62 (2.4)	96 (3.8)	118 (4.6)	155 (6.1)	138 (5.4)	1,166 (45.9)
Average precipitation days (≥ 1.0 mm)	8	8	9	11	10	7	5	5	7	8	11	9	98
Source 1: Climi e viaggi
Source 2: Istituto Superiore per la Protezione e la Ricerca Ambientale (precipitation 1951–1980)

== Main sights ==
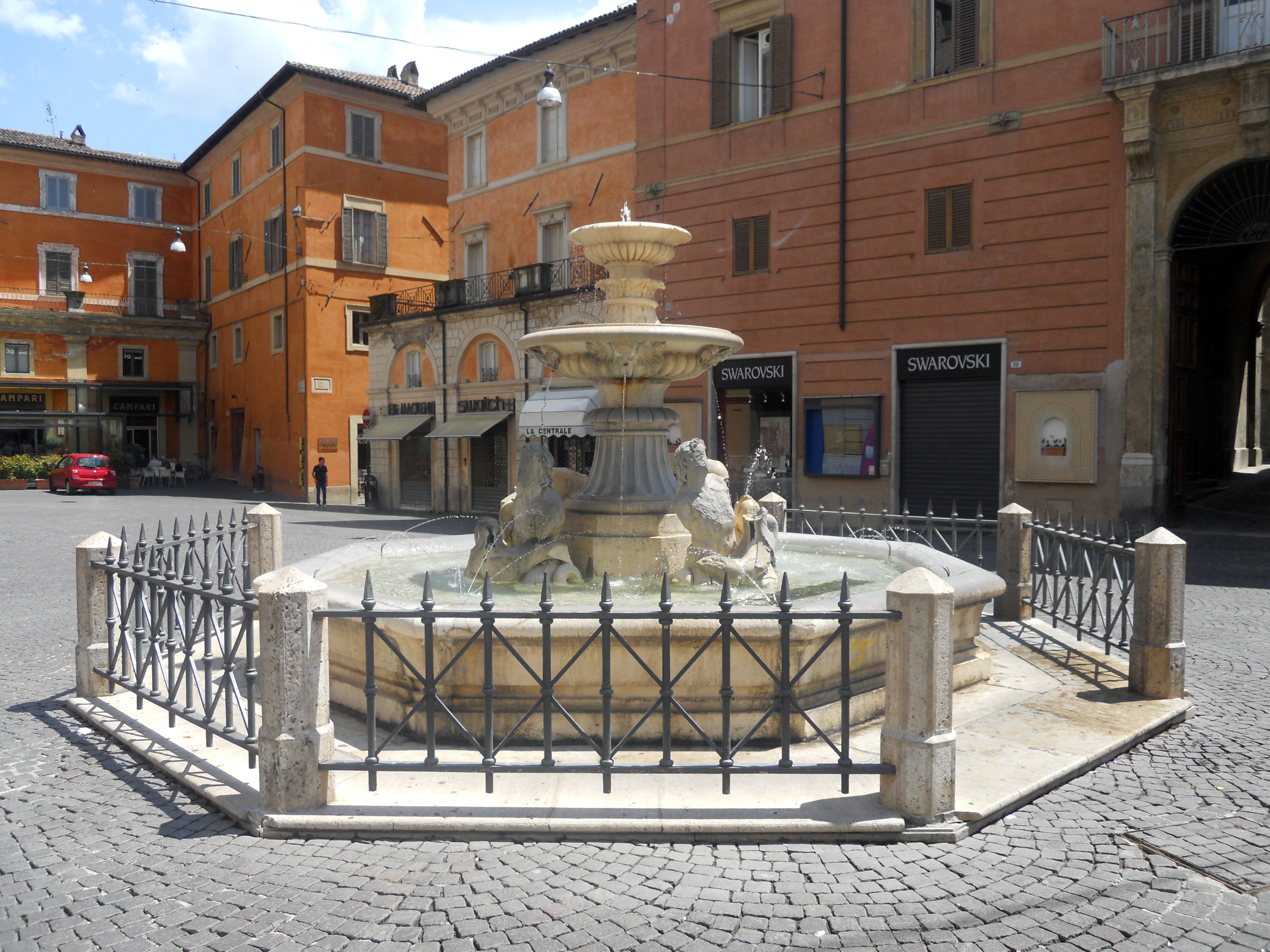
Fontana dei delfini.

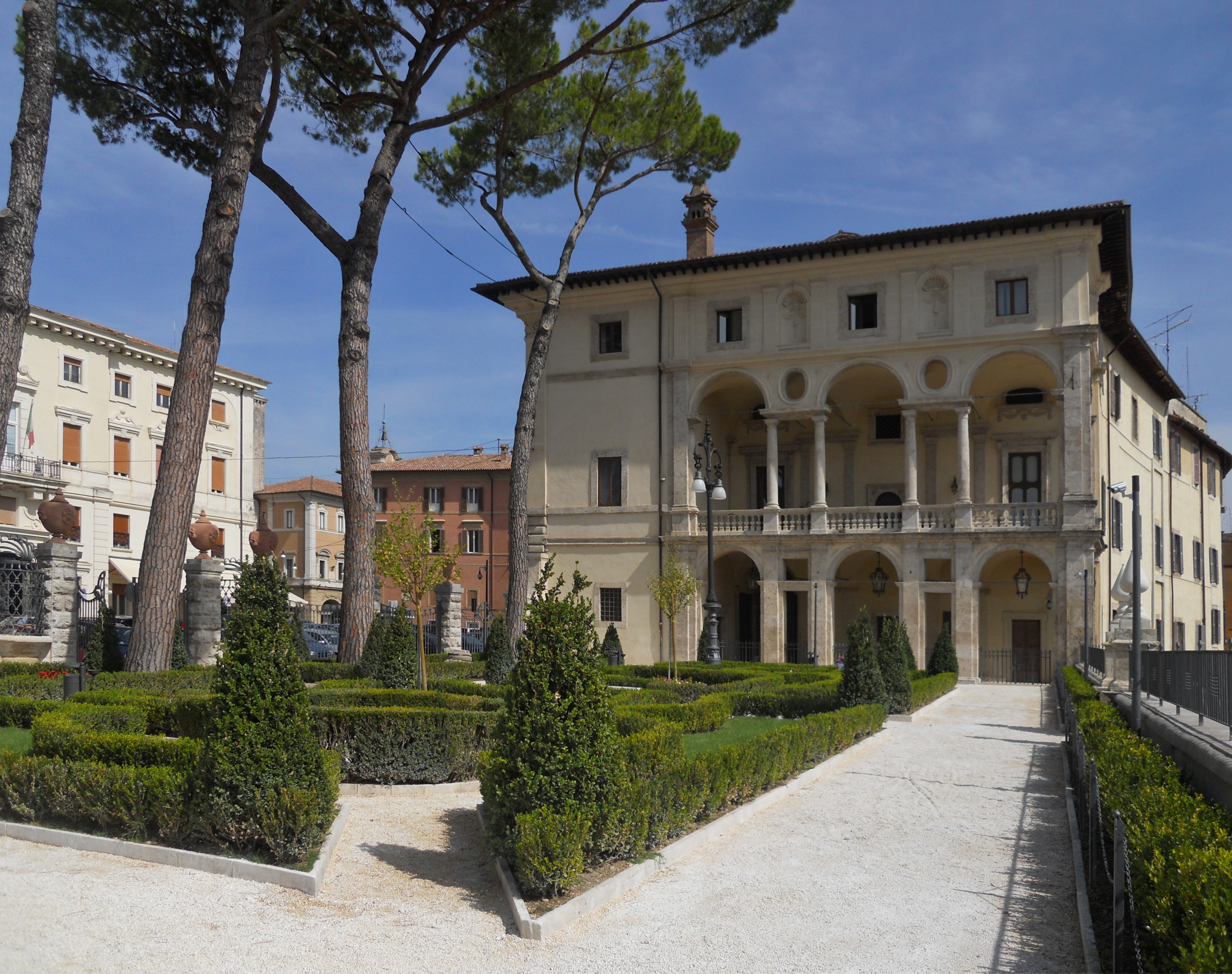
Loggia and gardens of Palazzo Vincentini.

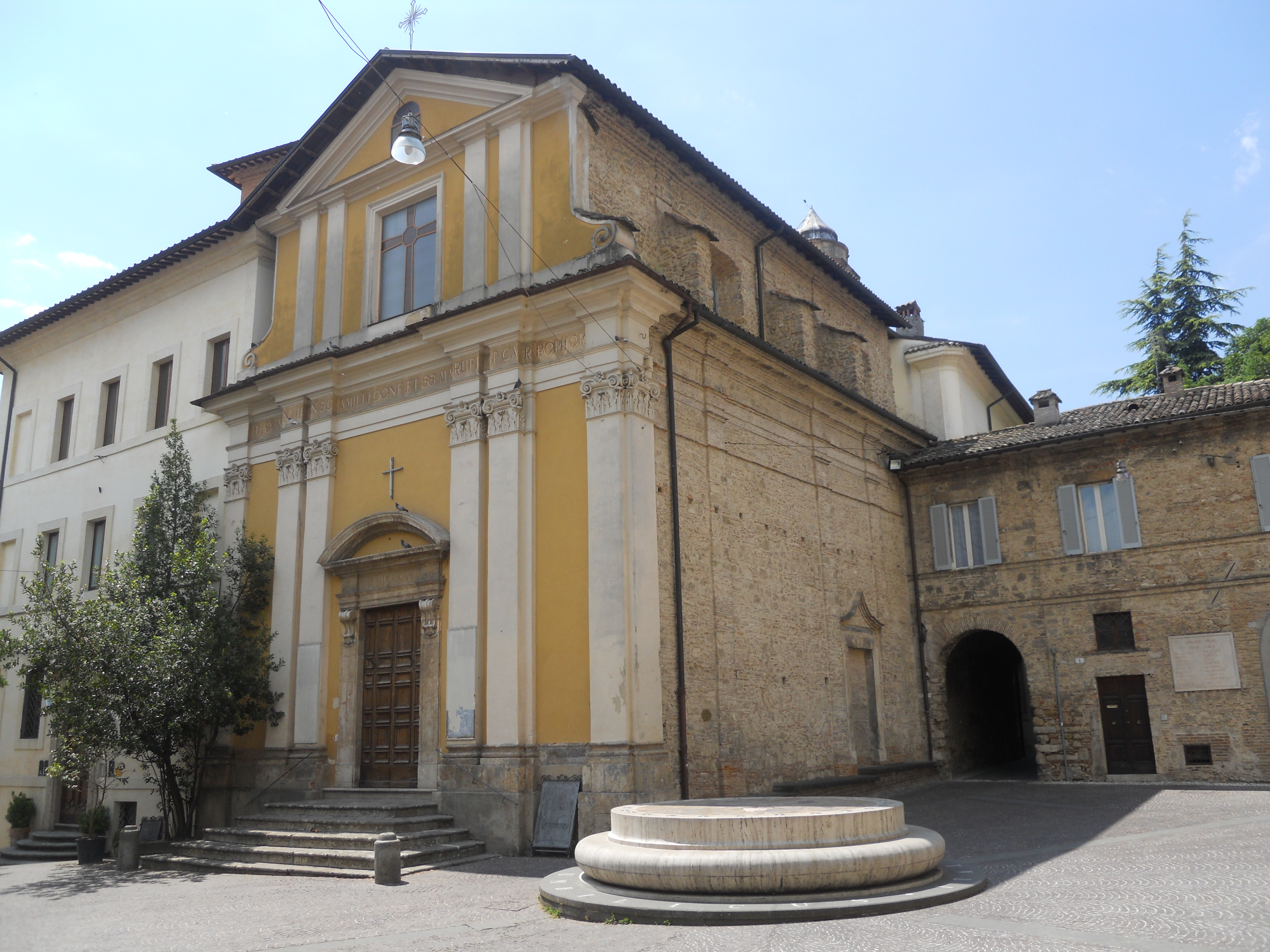
San Rufo church, in the square considered the centre of Italy.

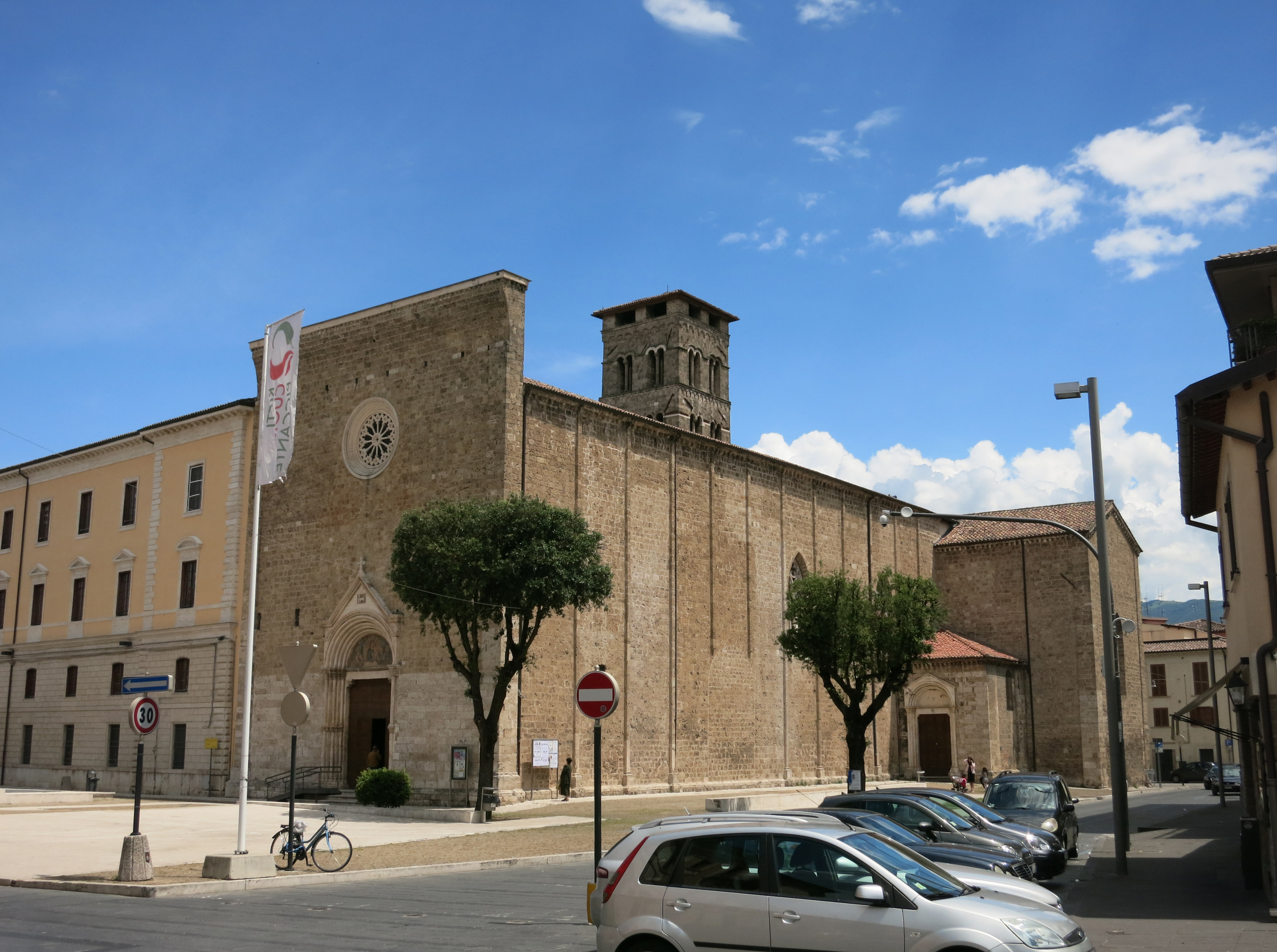
St. Augustine church.

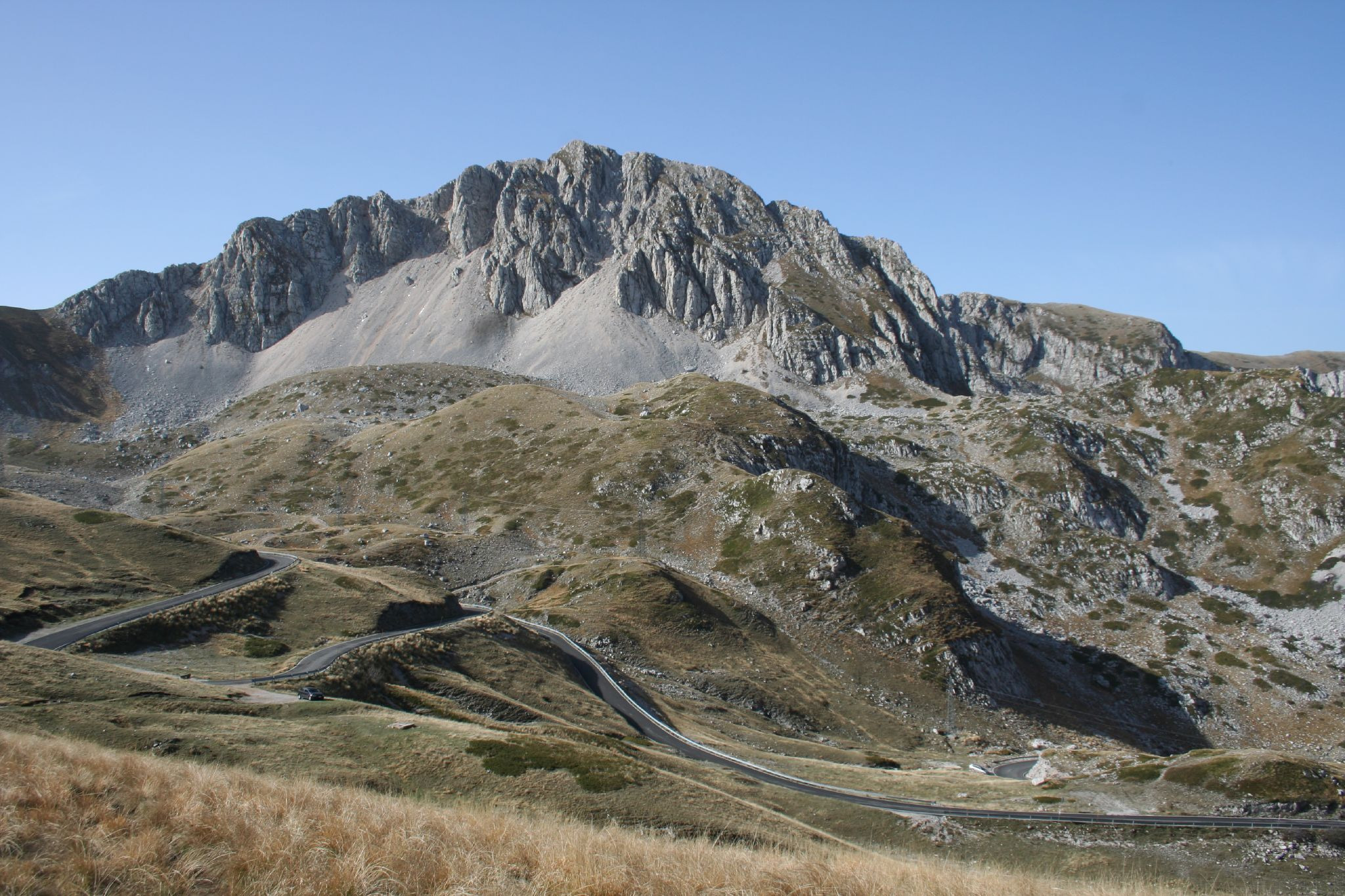
Mount Terminillo in summer.

The ancient Sabine and Roman city was crowded with buildings, including baths (thermae). Only scarce remains were found during excavations in 19th and 20th century: the foundations of a large temple, the stone floor of the main square (forum), walls from private houses, concrete vaults, statues and pottery items. The most striking remains are the stone bridge across the Velino river and the viaduct.

Piazza San Rufo is traditionally considered to be the exact centre of Italy (Latin Umbilicus Italiae).

Other sights include:

- Rieti Cathedral: Construction started in 1109 over a pre-existing basilica, was consecrated in 1225 and almost entirely rebuilt in 1639. It has a stunning Romanesque bell tower from 1252. The entrance portico leads to a 13th-century portal. The interior, on Latin cross plan with one nave and two aisles, has mainly Baroque decorations, including a St. Barbara sculpted by Giannantonio Mari (1657), probably designed by Bernini. Antoniazzo Romano contributed a fresco. It also houses canvases from 16th and 17th centuries. The crypt corresponds to the most ancient part of the church, consecrated in 1157. The Baptistery has an elegant 15th-century baptismal font.
- Palazzo Vescovile ("Bishops Palace" or "Papal Palace"): Construction begun in 1283. Noteworthy are the loggia and eight Renaissance-style windows from 1532. The lower floor is occupied by the so-called "Volte del Vescovado", a great portico with two naves of Gothic arcades. The Grand Hall houses the Diocese Gallery.

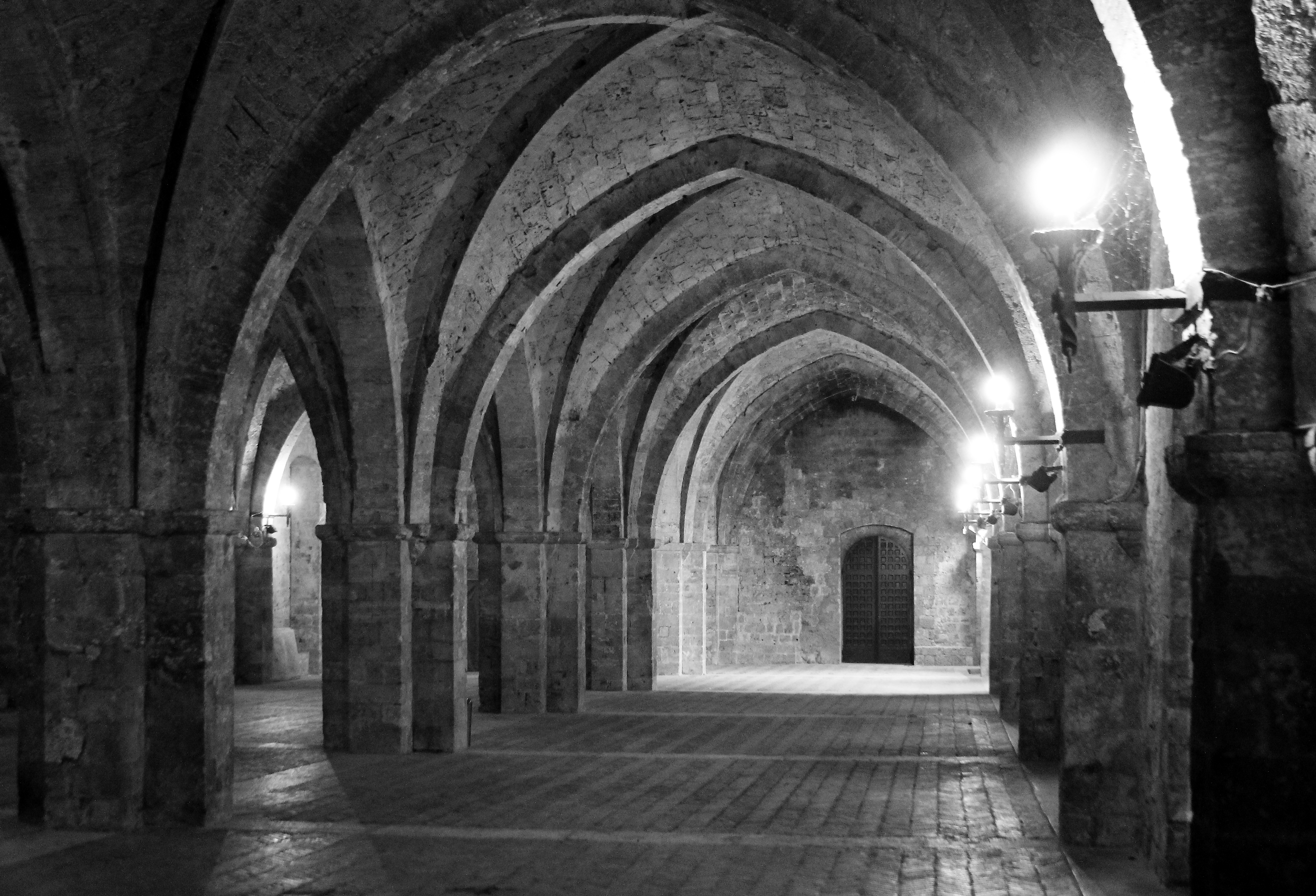
Vaults of Palazzo Vescovile, also known as the Papal Palace.

- Palazzo Comunale ("Town Hall", 13th century, rebuilt in the 18th century), facing Piazza Vittorio Emanuele II, a square corresponding to the ancient Roman forum. The Palace houses the town museum (Museo Civico di Rieti) which hosts works by Antoniazzo Romano, Antonio Canova, Bertel Thorwaldsen.

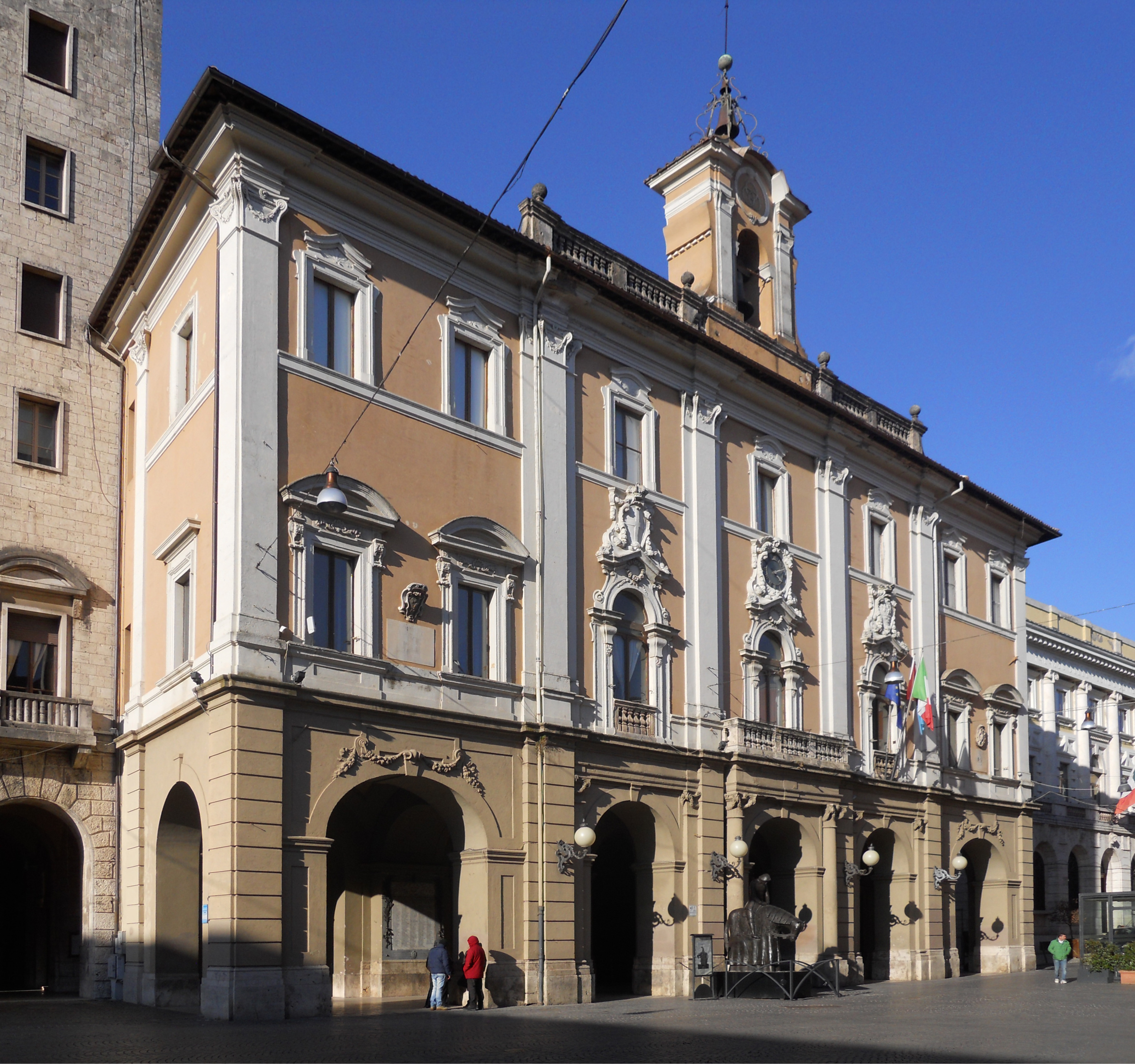
Palazzo Comunale.

- Palazzo del Governo, with a noble loggia from 1596.
- Bishop's Arch, a bridge built by Boniface VIII.
- San Pietro Martire - church of St. Peter Martyr (13th century), with luxurious golden Baroque decorations. It has a Presentation of Christ to the Temple by Giovanni Battista Gaulli.
- Palazzo Vicentini, attributed to Giuliano da Sangallo the Younger.
- Walls of Rieti; Walls date from first half of the 13th century, with characteristical rounded and square towers.
- Sant'Agostino: 13th century Gothic-style church restored in the 18th century). The portal has a fresco of Madonna with Child and Saints Augustine and Nicholas (1354) of Sienese school.
- San Francesco: church begun in 1245, radically restored in 1636). The interior has a single nave. The original frescoes from the 14th-15th centuries depicting scenes from the life of St. Francis and the Virgin and Child are now in the Diocese Museum and in the Palazzo Vescovile.
- Teatro Flavio Vespasiano is the city's theater and opera house, built in the late 19th century.
- Palazzo Vecchiarelli: late Renaissance palace designed by Carlo Maderno.
- Sant'Antonio al Monte: 15th century monastery and church
- Santa Chiara
- San Domenico

Also interesting are the sights in the Lake Lungo and Ripasottile Natural Preserve, and the Mount Terminillo.

== Notable people ==
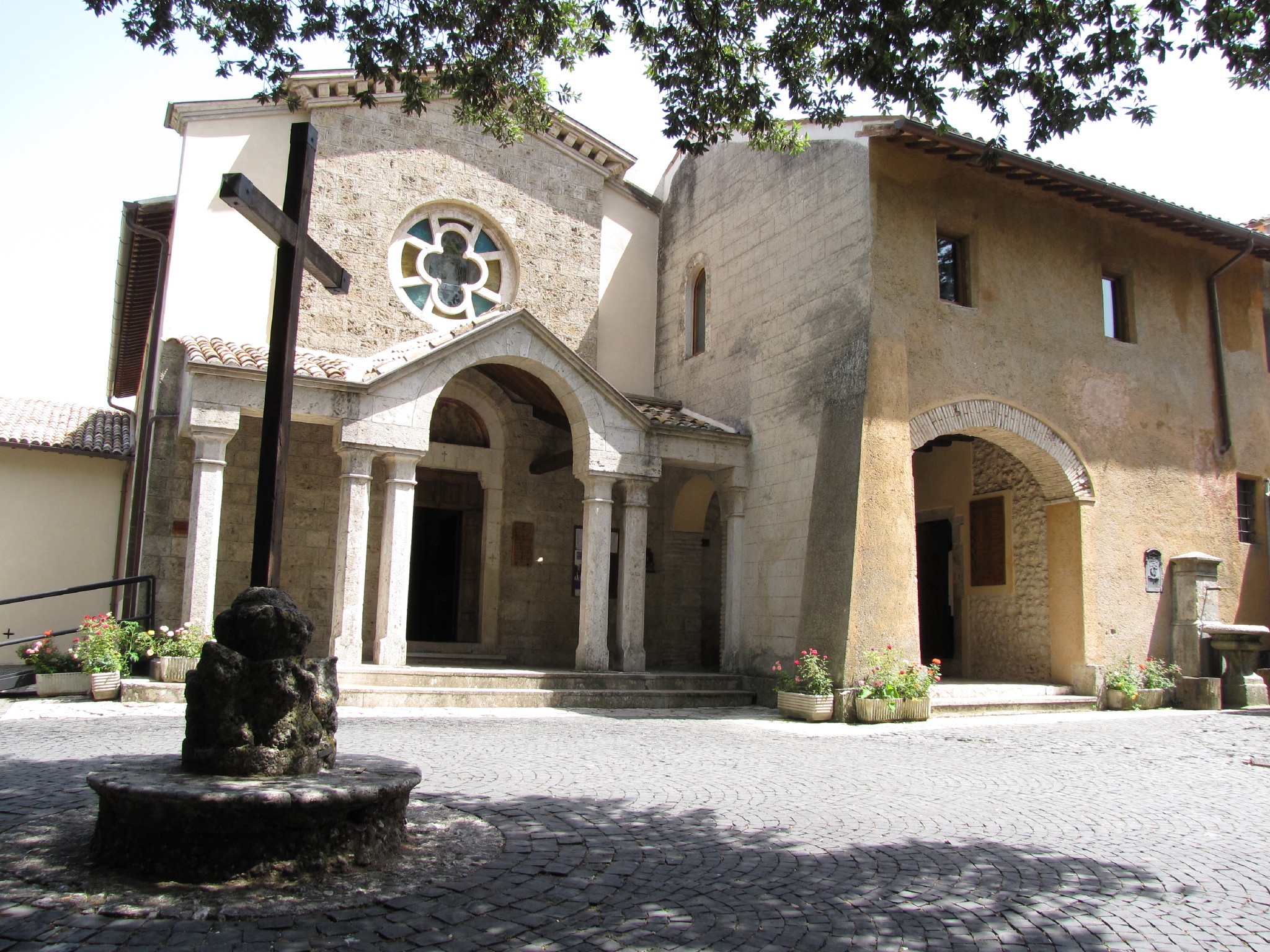
The Sanctuary of Fonte Colombo, near Rieti, founded by Saint Francis and part of the Cammino di Francesco pilgrim way

- Marcus Terentius Varro (116–27 BC), Roman scholar and writer.
- Antonio Gherardi (1638–1702), Italian painter, architect, and sculptor (stuccoist).
- Giuseppe Ottavio Pitoni (1657–1743), composer.
- Giuseppe Ferrari (1840–1905), painter.
- Elio Augusto Di Carlo (1918–1998), Italian ornithologist, historian and physician.
- Renzo De Felice (1929–1996), historian of Fascism.
- Kobe Bryant (1978–2020), NBA player grew up in Rieti.
- Willie Sojourner (1948–2005), NBA player. Played, coached and died in Rieti. PalaSojourner is named after him.
- Carlo Jucci (1897–1962), biologist and geneticist

== Twin cities ==
- Ito, Japan, since 1985
- Saint-Pierre-lès-Elbeuf, Seine-Maritime, Normandy, France, since 2000
- Nordhorn, Lower Saxony, Germany, since 2010

== Transportation ==
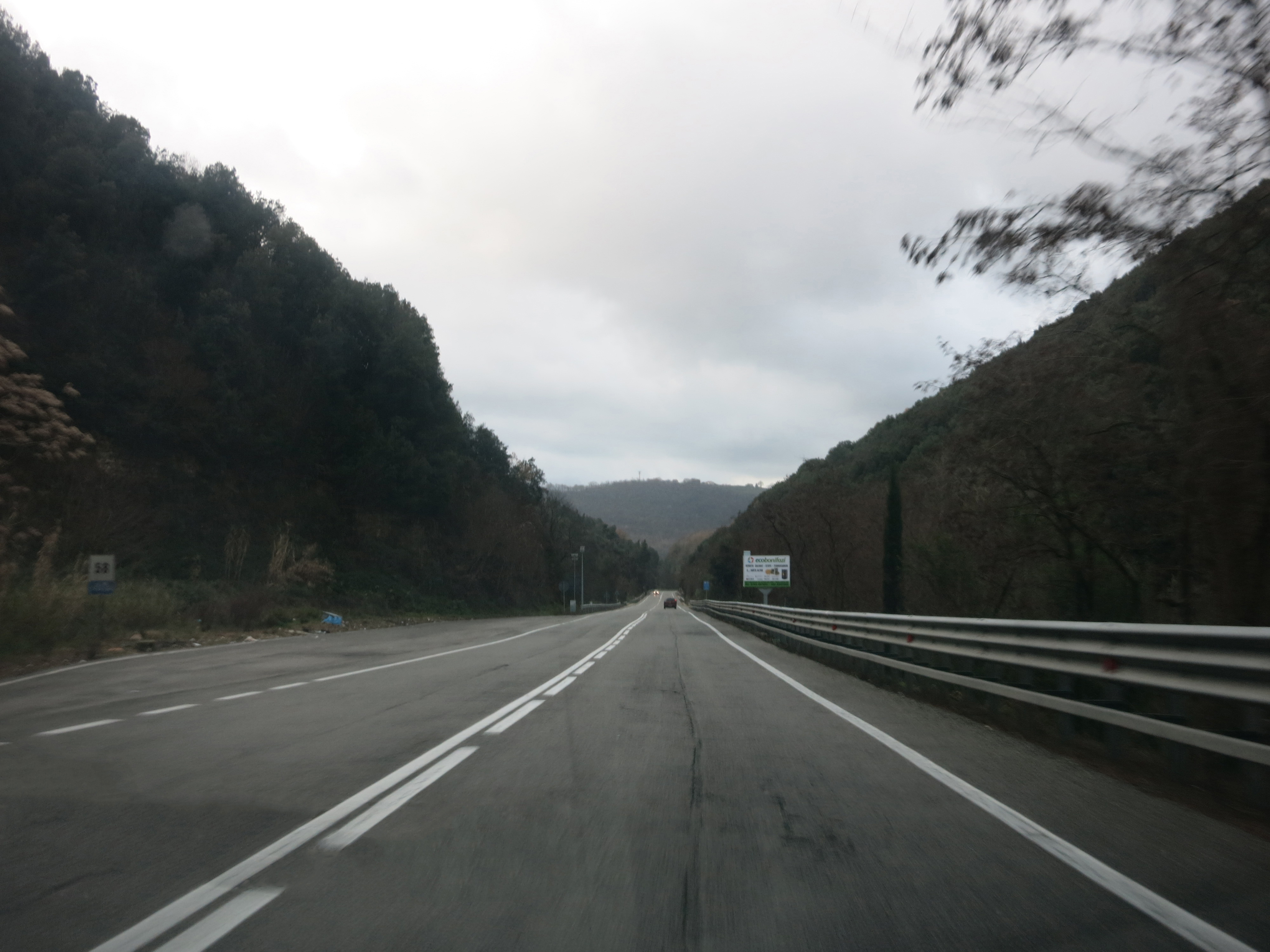
Strada statale 4 Via Salaria, the main road link between Rieti and Rome, near Poggio San Lorenzo

Rieti is not crossed by any of Autostrade of Italy; all roads connecting Rieti with other cities are therefore state highways (strade statali), in most cases single carriageway roads.

The most important road link is strada statale 4 Via Salaria, which connects Rieti with Rome at south and with Ascoli Piceno and the Adriatic Sea at north, just like the ancient Via Salaria Roman road. Other major roads include the strada statale 79 Ternana, which connects Rieti with Terni and with the Orte gate of Autostrada A1; strada statale 17, which branches from strada statale 4 in Antrodoco, connects Rieti with L'Aquila; strada statale 578 Salto Cicolana, which connects Rieti with Avezzano and with the Salto valley gate of A24 and A25 autostradas.

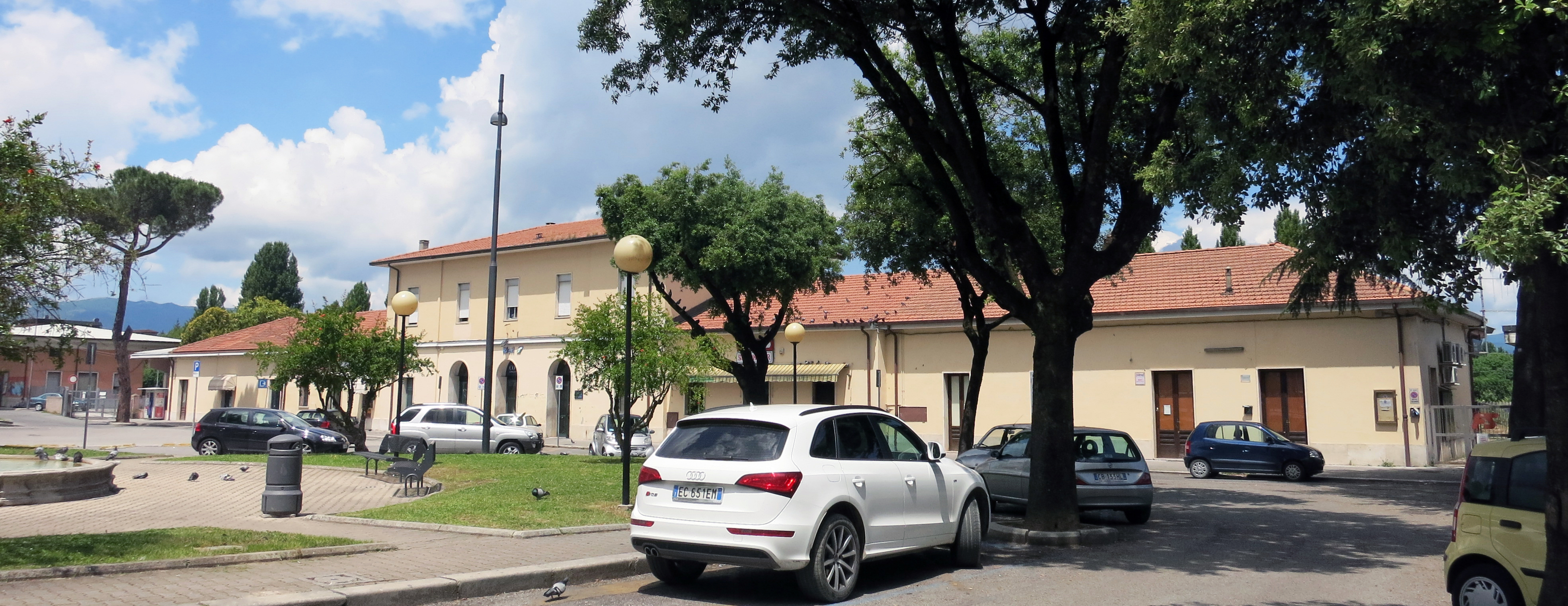
Rieti's railway station

Rieti's railway station is located on the regional, low traffic Terni–Sulmona railway, with trains to Terni and L'Aquila. There is no direct railway link between Rieti and Rome, as the construction of such railway has been subject of a long debate but never took place; Rome can be reached by bus or by catching a train to the Terni station, where direct trains to Rome can be found.

The Rieti Airport is mainly used by small private planes and for gliding.

== Sport ==
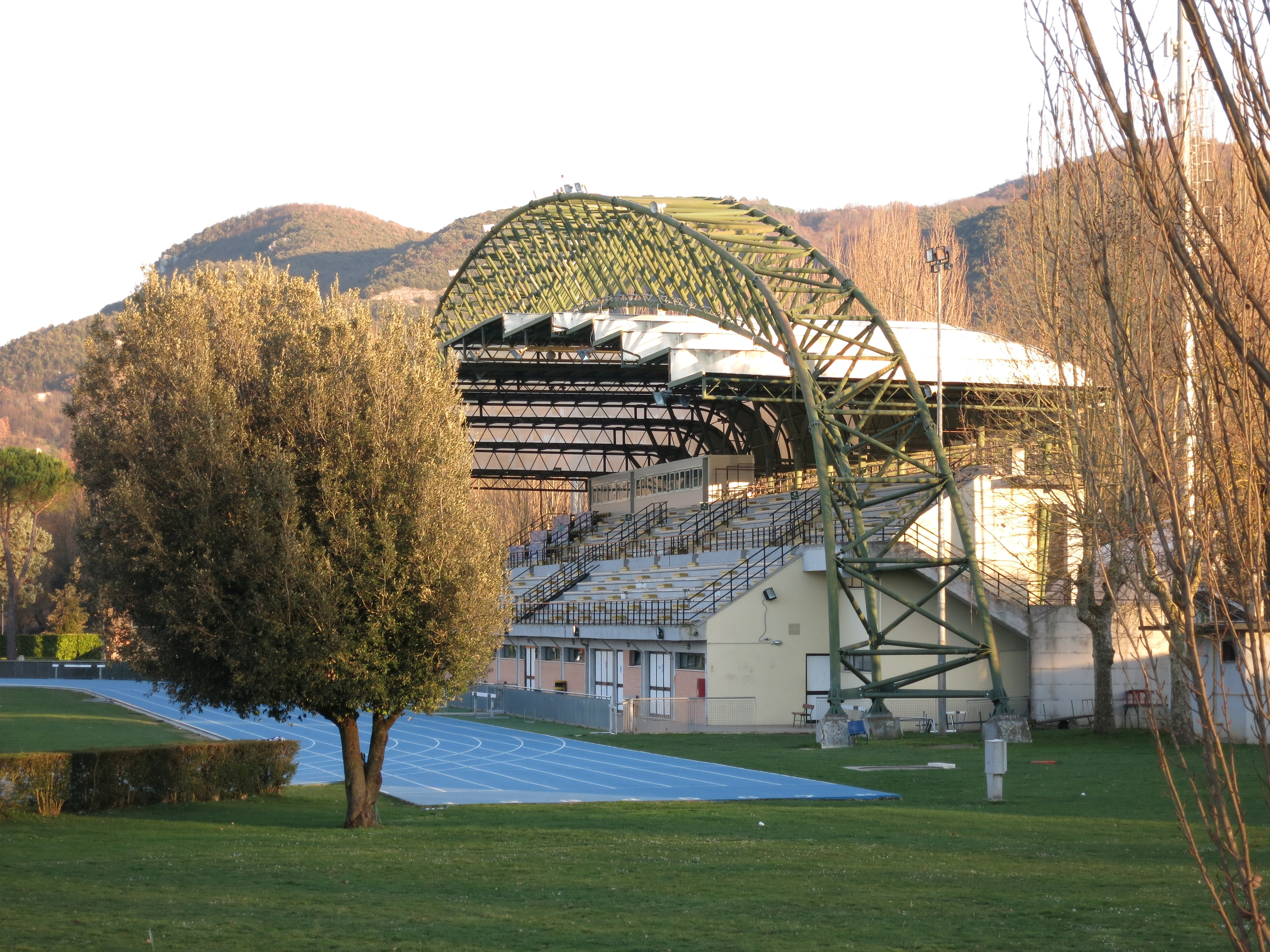
Athletics venue stadio Raul Guidobaldi

- Stadio Raul Guidobaldi in Rieti hosts every year since 1971 the Rieti Meeting, an international athletics event known for the many world records settled here, to the point that Steve Cram defined Rieti as "a Mecca for middle-distance runners looking for fast times". Example of these include Jamaican sprinter Asafa Powell, who ran the then world record time of 9.74 s in the 100 meters at the Rieti meeting on September 9, 2007 (the record stood until Usain Bolt broke it on 31 May 2008) and Kenyan runner David Rudisha, who ran a world record time of 1:41.01 in the 800 meters at the Rieti meeting on August 29, 2010 (the record stood until Rudisha beat his own mark at the 2012 Summer Olympics in London, running a 1:40:91 on August 9, 2012).
- The 2013 edition of European Athletics Junior Championships were also held at the Stadio Raul Guidobaldi.

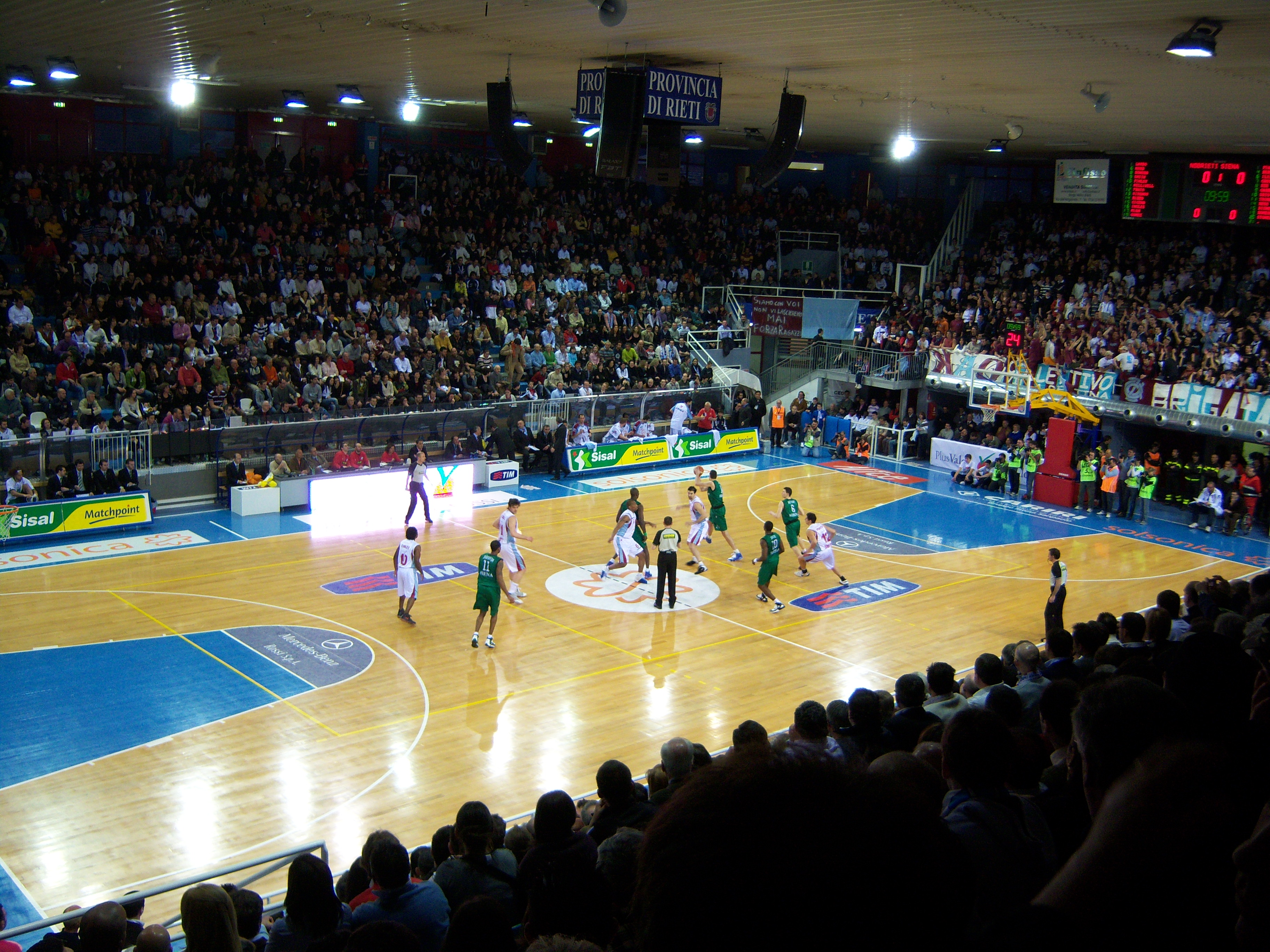
Basketball match of Nuova AMG Sebastiani at PalaSojourner

- Rieti is the base of a strong athletics movement, with an average of one athlete every forty inhabitants. Atletica Studentesca Andrea Milardi, formerly known as Atletica Studentesca CARIRI, is the main athletics team and has been the place where many Italian athletes grew up to become part of the Italy national athletics team. Among them is Andrew Howe, born in Los Angeles but grown up in Rieti, Angelo Cipolloni, Patrizia Spuri, Roberto Donati, Lorenzo Valentini and many others.
- Rieti was home to an important basketball team, AMG Sebastiani, which played in the PalaSojourner arena and won the 1979-80 FIBA Korać Cup, whose players included Willie Sojourner and Joe Bryant (who played in Rieti from 1984 to 1986 and then another 5 years in Italy; his son Kobe Bryant, who also became an NBA player, attended school in Rieti and as a result spoke fluent Italian.). After the dissolution of AMG Sebastiani, newer teams were formed such as Nuova AMG Sebastiani, which managed for some years to regain a spot in Italian basketball's first division.
- The biggest football club in Rieti is Serie C team FC Rieti, which plays at the Stadio Centro d'Italia – Manlio Scopigno. Futsal team Real Rieti Calcio a 5 plays in Italy's premier league.
- Rieti is home to a 9-hole golf course, the "Centre of Italy" golf club.

== See also ==
- Lake of Cutilia
