= Antoniazzo Romano =

Italian Early Renaissance painter (c. 1430–c. 1510)

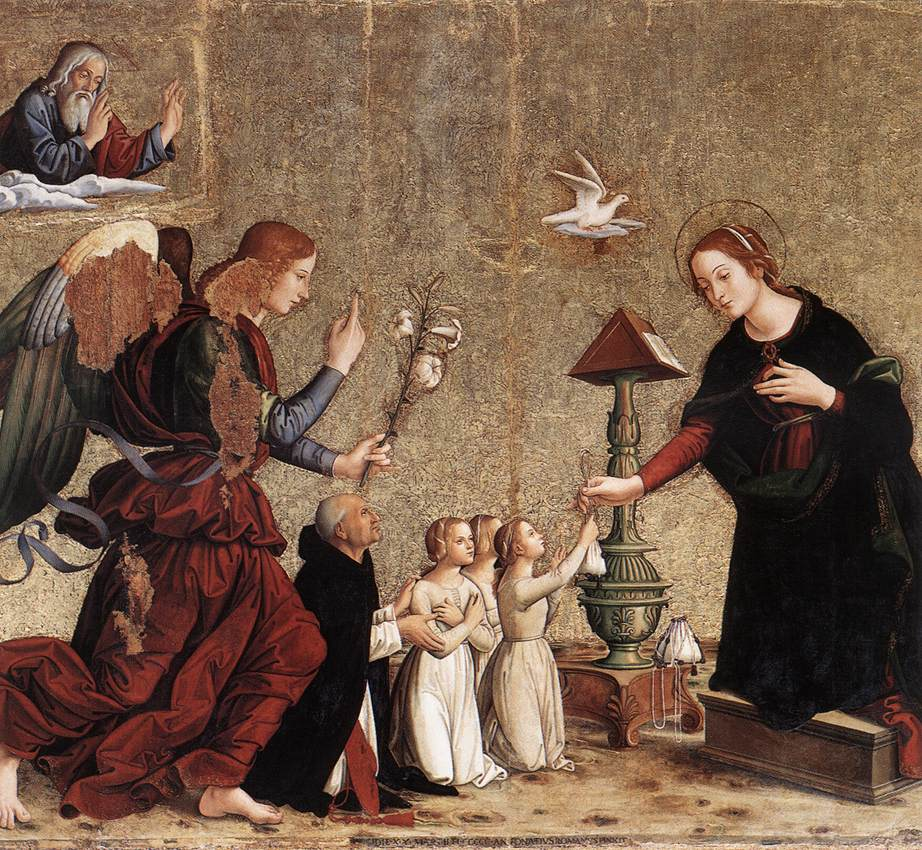
Annunciation by Antoniazzo da Romano, in the church of Santa Maria sopra Minerva, Rome

Antonio di Benedetto Aquilo degli Aquili (c. 1430 – c. 1510), known as Antoniazzo Romano, was an Italian Early Renaissance painter, the leading figure of the Roman school during the latter part of the 15th century He "made a speciality of repainting or interpreting older images, or generating new cult images with an archaic flavor", in particular by very often using the gold ground style, which was unusual by this period.

== Biography ==
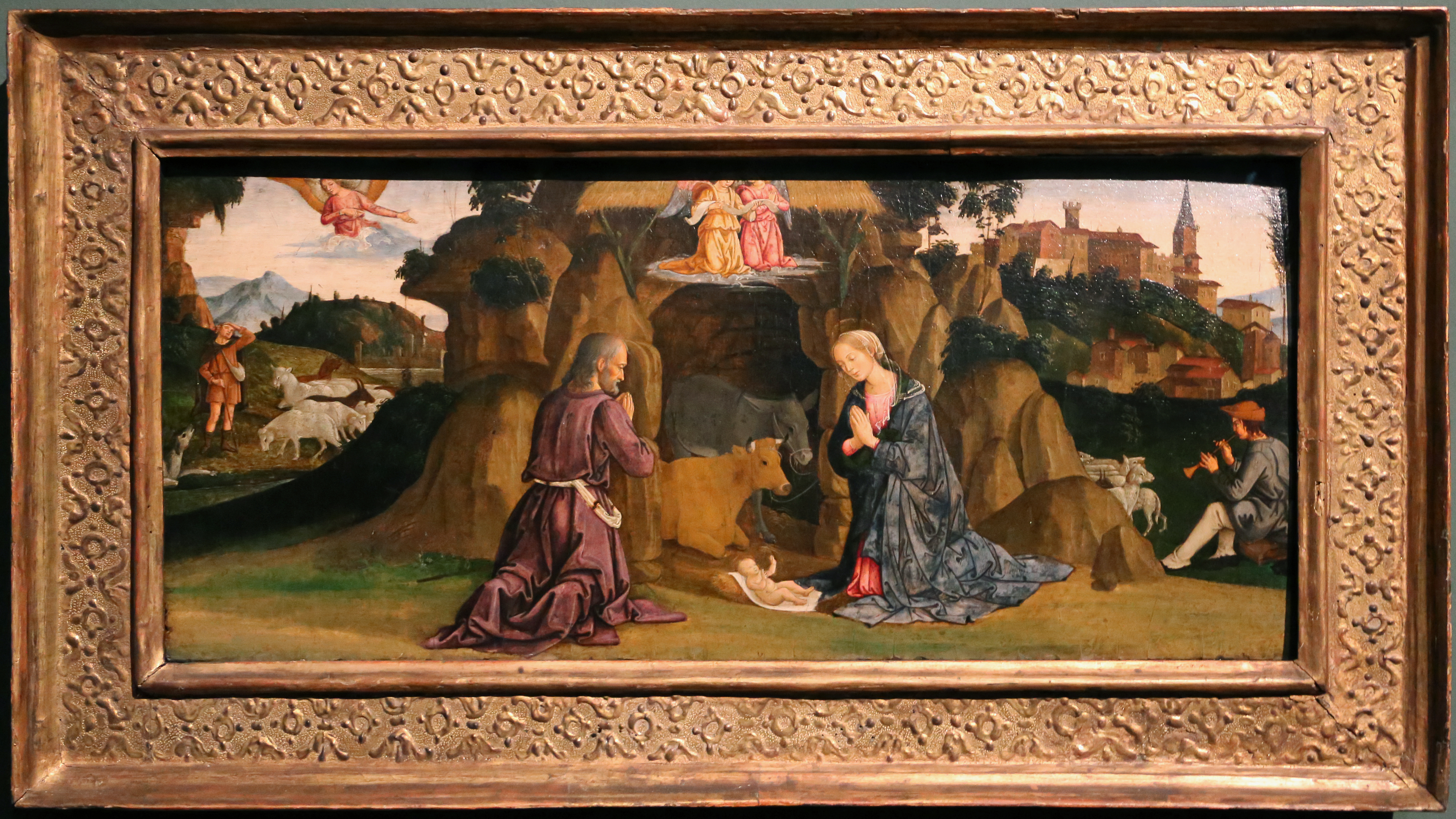
Nativity, late 1480s

Antoniazzo was born in the Colonna rione of Rome. His father was a painter. Antoniazzo was fined as a young man for brawling in the streets.

He was influenced at first by the decorative manner of Benozzo Gozzoli and Beato Angelico, as well as by the local painters of Lazio. His first recorded work is from 1461, a replica (untraced) of the miraculous Virgin and Child of St. Luke in the Basilica of Santa Maria Maggiore of Rome, for the seignior of Pesaro, Alessandro Sforza.

From 1464, he worked for the papal court, producing at first a triptych of the Virgin and Child with Saints in Rieti. He was among those hired to paint banners and decorations for the installation ceremonies of Pope Paul II. In 1467 he completed the decoration of the funerary chapel of Cardinal Bessarion in the church of Santi Apostoli, located not far from the house where he was born. In the centre of the decoration was an icon of the Virgin, now in the Chapel of St Anthony, a copy of the Byzantine icon in the Santa Maria in Cosmedin, the church of the Greeks in Rome. This icon in the Santi Apostoli is one of the most remarkable examples of Antoniazzo's considerable production of Virgins, generally taken from Byzantine models: he was indeed a much sought-after copier of icons. Later he worked to a series of frescoes in the Monastery of Tor de' Specchi in Rome, featuring stories of the life of S. Francesca Romana, and to the decoration of the public rooms of the Palazzo Venezia. Giorgio Vasari called Antoniazzo one of the best painters in Rome at that time.

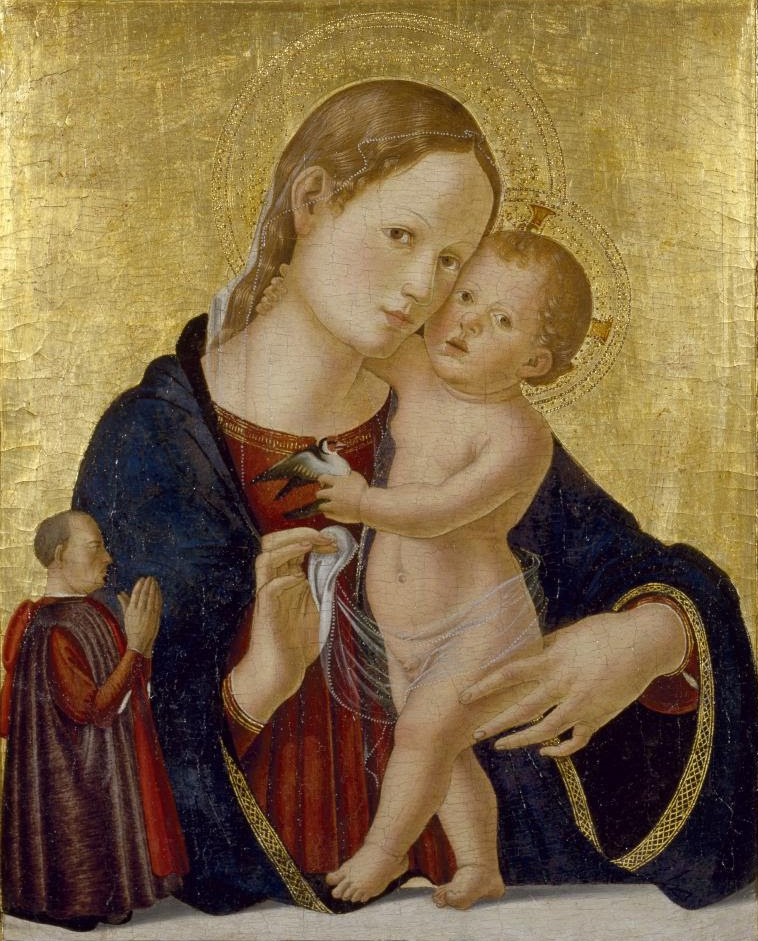
Virgin and Child with donor portrait, c. 1480

In the 1470s, Antoniazzo worked on the decoration of the Vatican Palace with artists like Perugino, Melozzo da Forlì and Ghirlandaio. Through their influence, his figures acquired gentler expressions and their garments were ornamented with decorative patterns, though always retaining several Medieval features.

In Santa Maria sopra Minerva, he painted for that church a famous Annunciation (1500). The painting shows the Dominican Cardinal Juan de Torquemada (d. 1468) presenting poor girls dowered by the guild of the Annunciation. The Cardinal Torquemada founded this guild, which was dedicated to the Virgin Mary.

In the years between 1475 and 1480, Antoniazzo's production of altarpieces and panels with images of the Virgin increased as a result of the encouragement of the cult of the Virgin by Pope Sixtus IV. Around 1480, he painted a single-panel altarpiece for Clemente Brigante Colonna's chapel in the church of Santa Maria Maggiore, Tivoli.

His later works show an increasing mannerism in their features, which were later imitated by several painters, whose works had often been attributed to the master. Antoniazzo was one of the three founders of the Accademia di San Luca, the guild of painters and illuminators in Rome, and signed the statutes in 1478. His last known work is dated 1497. He is buried in the family chapel in San Luigi dei Francesi

A portion of his Madonna and Child with Donor from the Houston, Texas Museum of Fine Arts was chosen as the art masterpiece United States Postal Service's Christmas stamp for 1991.

== Major works ==
- Histories of St. Francesca Romana (1468) Fresco, Tor de' Specchi Monastery, Rome
- Virgin and Child Enthroned (c. 1470) - Fresco, Santa Maria della Consolazione, Rome
- Virgin and Child with the Saints Peter and Paul (c. 1474) San Pietro, Fondi, Italy
- Annunciation (1485) - Wood, Santa Maria sopra Minerva, Rome
- Madonna Enthroned with the Infant Christ and Saint (1487) - Oil on panel, 166 x 165 cm, Galleria Nazionale d'Arte Antica, Rome
- Nativity with Saints Lawrence and Andrew (1480–1485) - Tempera on panel, 142 x 176 cm, Galleria Nazionale d'Arte Antica, Rome

== Sources ==
- Claudio Rendina, Enciclopedia di Roma, Newton Compton, Rome.
- Roberto Longhi, In favore di Antoniazzo Romano, «Vita artistica. Studi di Storia dell’arte», 1927, 2, 11–12, p. 250, reprinted in Edizione delle opere complete di Roberto Longhi, vol. II. Saggi e ricerche 1925–28, Firenze, 1967, I, pp. 245– 256
- Anna Cavallaro, Antoniazzo Romano e gli antoniazzeschi. Una generazione di pittori nella Roma del Quattrocento, Udine, Ed. Campanotto, 1992
- Gerardo de Simone, Melozzo e Roma, saggio in Melozzo da Forlì. L’umana bellezza tra Piero della Francesca e Raffaello, a cura di D. Benati, M. Natale, A. Paolucci, catalogo della mostra (Forlì, Musei S. Domenico, 2011), Silvana Editoriale, 2011, pp. 37–51, e schede pp. 192–199 e 222–223
- Gerardo de Simone, The Use of Trecento Sources in Antoniazzo Romano and Lorenzo da Viterbo, in "Predella", 35, 2014 [2015], ed. by Louise Bourdua, online (http://www.predella.it/index.php/component/content/article/51-issue-35/290-35-monograph-5-de-simone.html) e a stampa (Predella Monografie, n. 9, 2014, ETS Edizioni, Pisa)
- Antoniazzo Romano. Pictor Urbis. 1435/1440-1508, catalogo della mostra a cura di Anna Cavallaro e Stefano Petrocchi (Roma, Galleria nazionale di Palazzo Barberini, 2013–2014), Cinisello Balsamo (Milano) 2013
