= L'Aquila railway station =

Railway station in Italy

L'Aquila
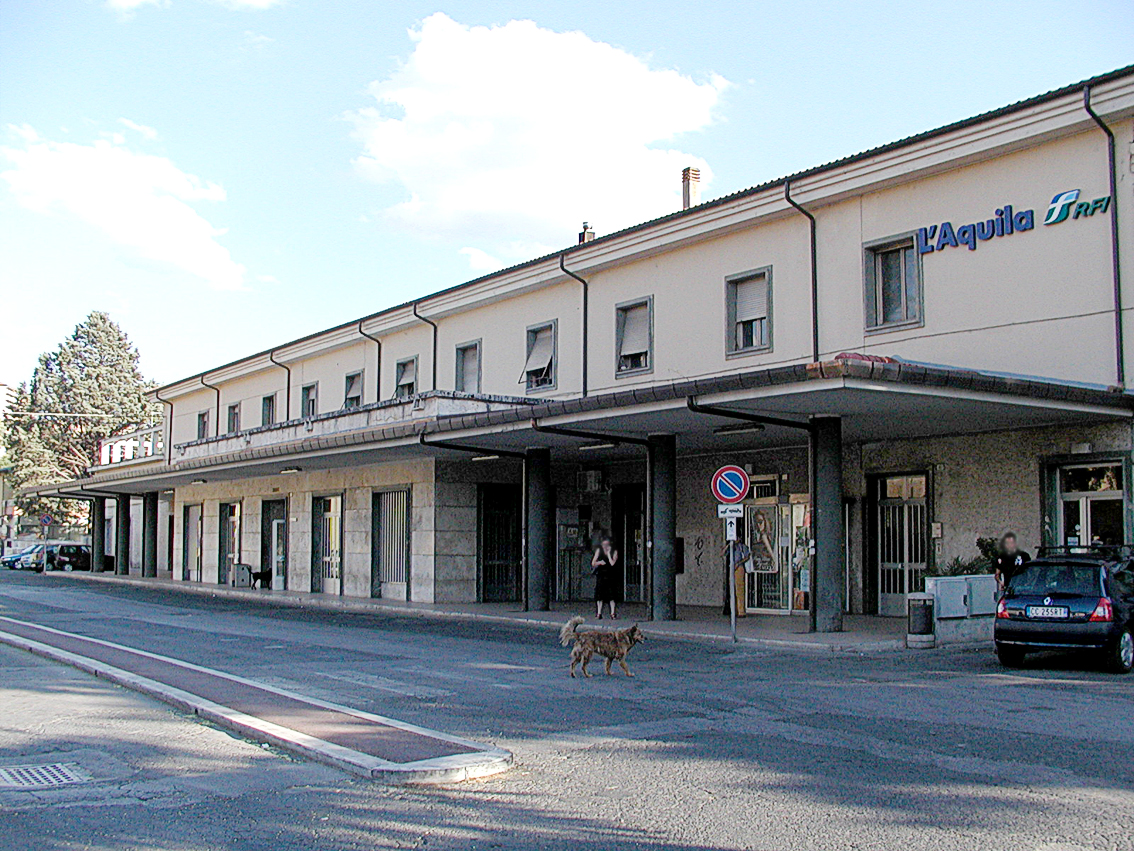
- View of the passenger building.

General information
- Location: Piazzale Stazione 1; 67100 L'Aquila AQ; L'Aquila, L'Aquila, Abruzzo; Italy
- Coordinates: 42°21′04″N 13°23′06″E
- Operator: Rete Ferroviaria Italiana; Centostazioni
- Line: Terni–Sulmona
- Distance: 67.660 km (42.042 mi) from Pescara
- Train operators: Trenitalia; Ferrovia Centrale Umbra
- Connections: Urban buses

Other information
- Classification: Silver

History
- Opened: 10 May 1875; 151 years ago
Location
- Location within Abruzzo Location within Italy

L'Aquila railway station (Italian: Stazione dell'Aquila) serves the city and comune of L'Aquila, in the region of Abruzzo, southern Italy. Opened in 1875, it forms part of the Terni–Sulmona railway.

The station is currently managed by Rete Ferroviaria Italiana (RFI). However, the commercial area of the passenger building is managed by Centostazioni. Train services between L'Aquila and Sulmona are operated by Trenitalia. Each of these companies is a subsidiary of Ferrovie dello Stato Italiane (FS), Italy's state-owned rail company.

Train services between L'Aquila and Terni are operated by Ferrovia Centrale Umbra, a company owned by the province of Perugia.

== Location ==
L'Aquila railway station is situated in Piazzale Stazione, to the west of the city centre.

== History ==
The station was built by the Società per le Strade Ferrate Meridionali (English: Company for the Southern Railways, SFM). It was opened on 10 May 1875, upon the inauguration of the Molina–L'Aquila section of the Terni–Sulmona railway, which was being constructed as a strategic rail link to Castellammare Adriatico (now Pescara), an important node in the Adriatic Railway.

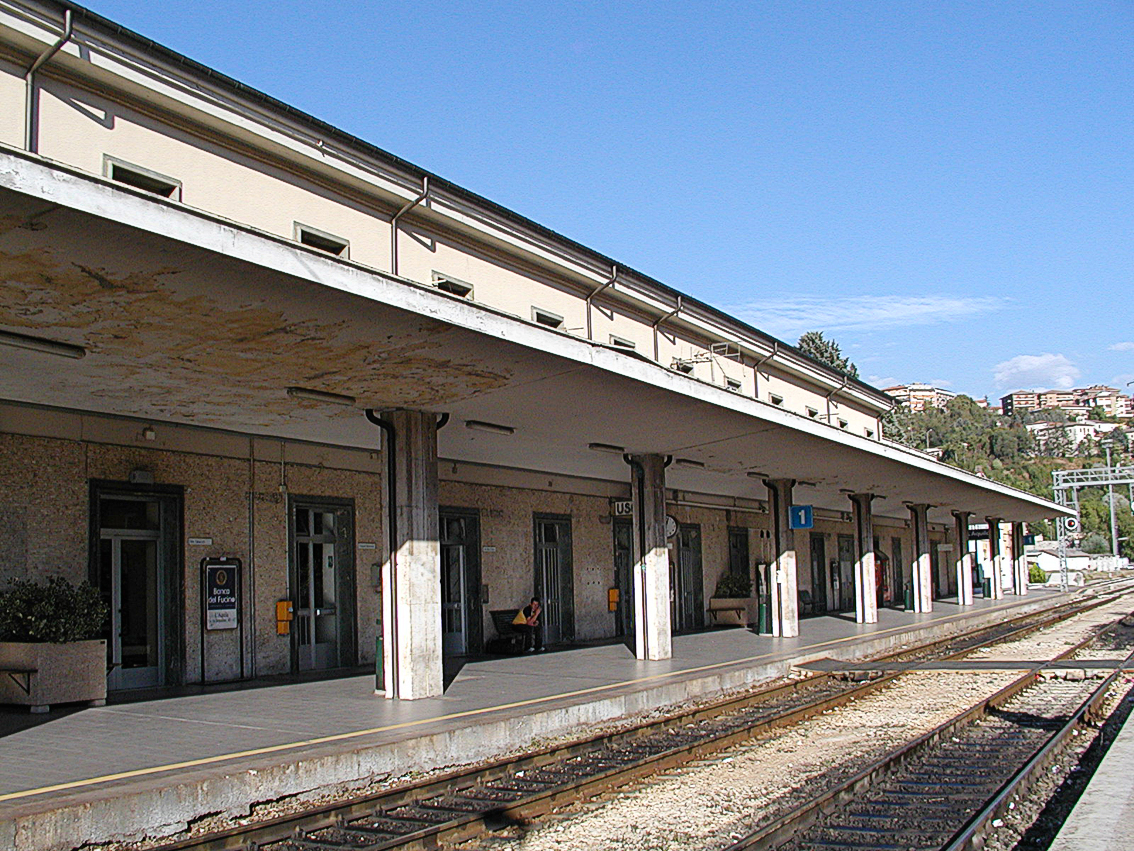
View of the main platform

Until 28 October 1883, the date of entry into service of the line's extension to Rieti and Terni, the station carried out the functions of a terminal station. It then became an intermediate station. Between 1922 and 1933, it was flanked by SIA railway station, terminus of the short lived Capitignano line.

World War II led to the devastation of the station premises. On 8 December 1943, Allied planes bombed the station, claiming hundreds of civilian and military casualties. In 1951, the passenger building was rebuilt in 1951 as a project of the architect Roberto Narducci.

The station has seen its importance decrease following the increase in road traffic, especially after the entry into operation of the Rome–Aquila motorway, and culminating with the closure in 1987 of the direct line Freccia del Gran Sasso, the direct connection with Rome. The station was damaged by the earthquake that hit L'Aquila in 2009, but came back into operation a few days after the earthquake.

== Train movements ==
The trains stopping at the station are regional trains to Sulmona and Terni. They are a small regional composition made up of ALn 668 class railcars in a diesel version designated as the 3300, with a "mountain" gear ratio limiting its top speed to 120 kilometres per hour (75 mph).

Since 15 June 2008, the train service to Terni has been operated by Ferrovia Centrale Umbra, which has taken on the management of the Terni-L'Aquila section following the reorganization of regional rail transport.

The station is served by the following service(s):

- Regional services (Treno regionale) L'Aquila - Sulmona
- Regional services (Treno regionale) Terni - Rieti - L'Aquila

== See also ==
- History of rail transport in Italy
- List of railway stations in Abruzzo
- Rail transport in Italy
- Railway stations in Italy
