= Aquae Cutiliae =

Mineral spring in Italy

Coordinates: 42.3767969°N 12.984039°E

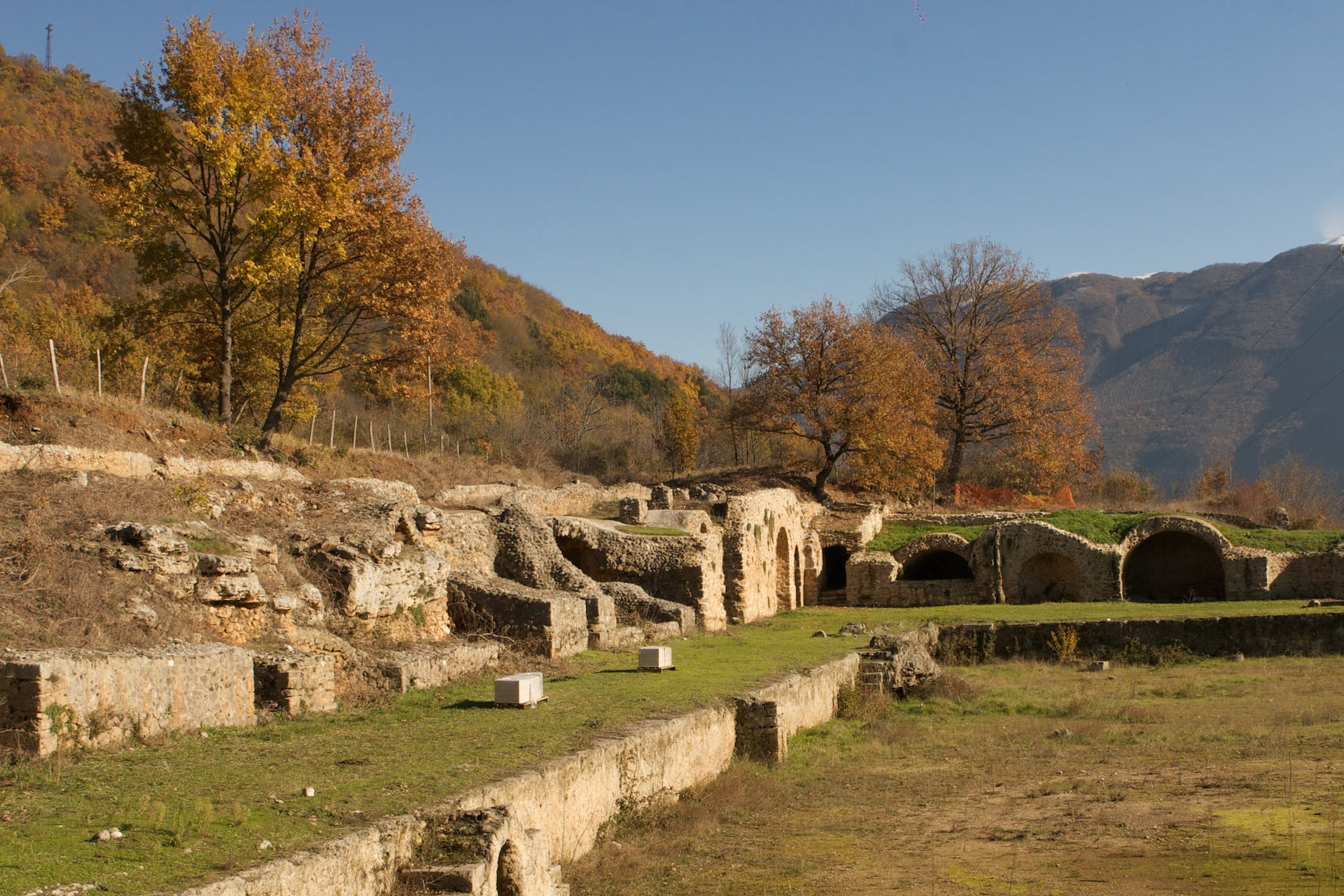
So-called Baths of Vespasian

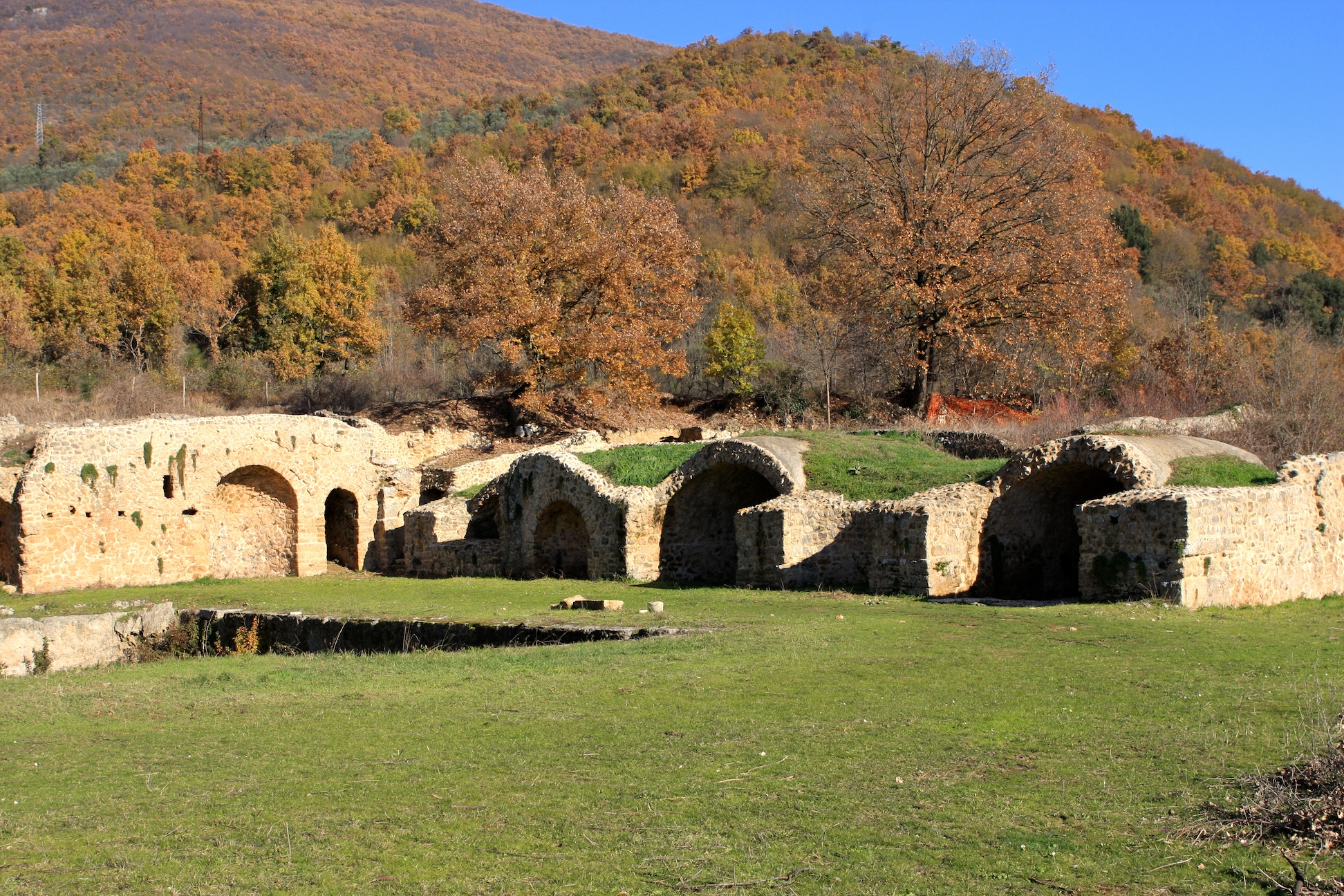
So-called Baths of Vespasian

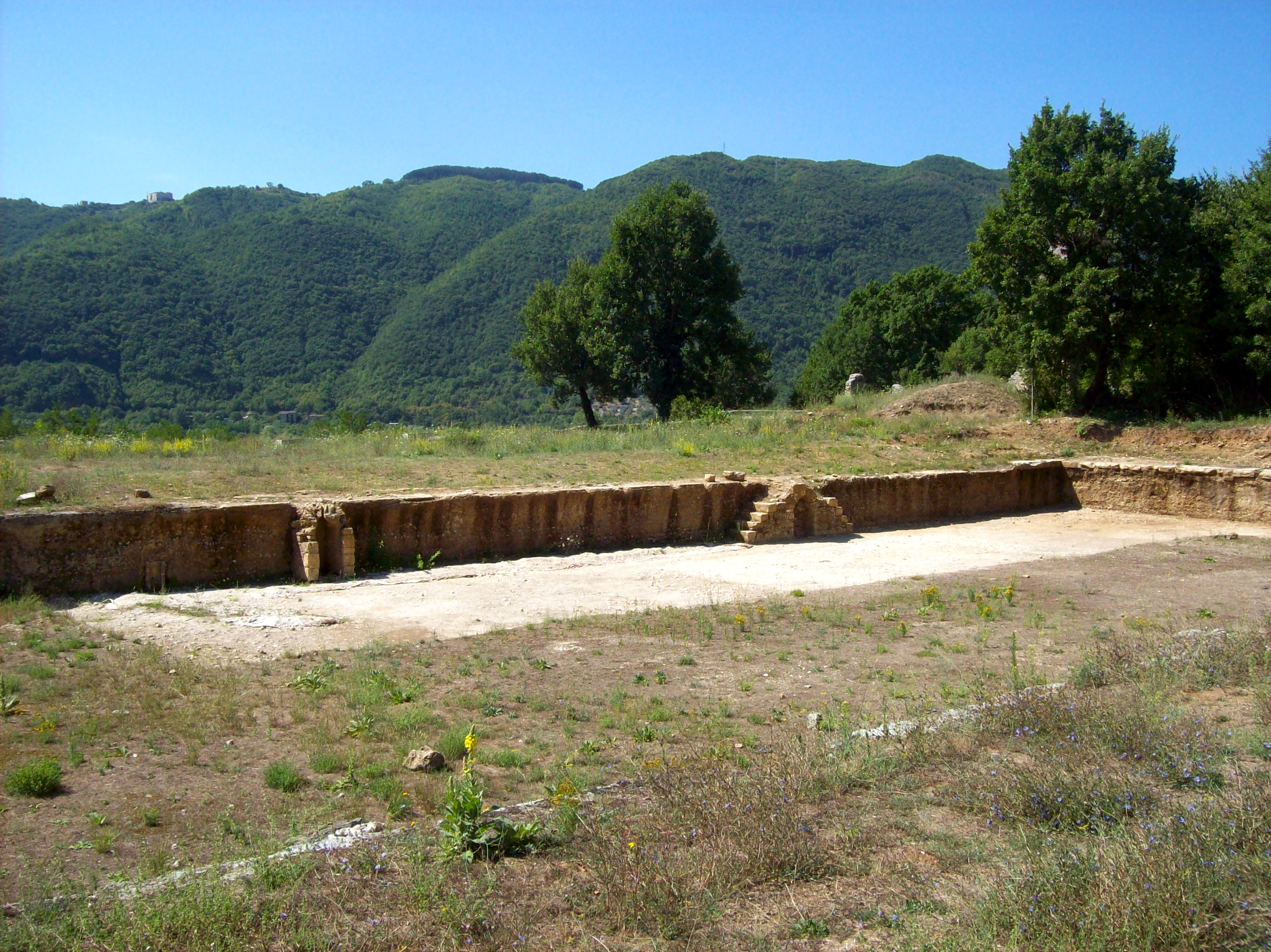
Baths swimming pool

Aquae Cutiliae is an ancient Roman site situated on mineral springs known today as Terme di Cotilia or Terme di Vespasiano, near the modern Cittaducale, 9 miles east of Rieti in the Sabina region.

It took its name from the nearby village (vicus) of Cutiliae or Cutilium whose exact location is unknown.

Emperors Vespasian and his son Titus both died there.

== History ==
Cutiliae is mentioned by Dionysius of Halicarnassus as an important centre of ancient peoples who inhabited Sabina before the arrival of the Sabines.

The nearby Lake of Cutilia was supposed by classical writers such as Pliny, Seneca and Varro to be the centre of Italy, and was renowned for its floating islands, which, as in other cases, were formed from the partial petrification of plants by the mineral substances contained in the water. The lake itself was sacred to the Sabine goddess Vacuna and for this reason made inaccessible with fences.

The baths were built at the settlement to benefit from the perceived healing waters.

According to Suetonius, Roman Emperor Vespasian had a villa at Cutiliae: "he left for Cutiliae and the fields of Reate, where he spent the summer every year", while his son, emperor Titus, "retired to the same villa as his father" and both died there. Vespasian suffered increasingly severe intestinal problems and died in 79 AD at Aquae Cutiliae perhaps due to excessive bathing in the cold waters.

Its name appears on the Peutinger Table as Aqve cvtillie on the Via Salaria.

=== Excavations ===
The first excavations of the baths were done after the discovery of remains in 1890. The excavations carried out in the years 1969-1984 brought to light more of the "Terme di Cotilia", as known in the archaeological literature (or the baths of Vespasian).

Recent archaeological excavations (2007-2012) revealed a section of the ancient road at the first terrace level of the baths, just outside the enclosure walls.

== The site ==
The well-preserved monumental buildings of the so-called Baths of Vespasian lie about 2 km west of lake Cutilia and extend for 400 m and on four terraces. The site was probably originally a sanctuary to the goddess Vacuna similar to many others built in Latium in the late Republican age. On the 2nd terrace, a large natatio (swimming pool) was excavated from the solid rock, measuring 60 by 24 m, and was accessed by swimmers by steps on the longer sides of the basin. It was extended in several periods and used up to the 4th c. AD, and was probably fed by an underground spring. There is also a series of niches and rooms around an apse on the north side that formed a monumental nymphaeum. The west side lies beneath a later church and mill and dates to the Flavian era, showing rooms that heated the spring water for the baths. The baths were used until the 4th-5th century.

On the 3rd terrace 5 pillars are visible, probably belonging to the portico near the corridor. It is possible that this part collapsed around the III/IV century AD, perhaps due to an earthquake or to the Lombard conquest, and was never rebuilt.

A wide section of the ancient road a few hundred metres long has been revealed on the first terrace level of the baths, just outside the enclosure walls.The architectural majesty of the baths, unique for rural Sabina of the late republican and early imperial period, can be explained by their prominent position near the major road.

== Nearby site ==
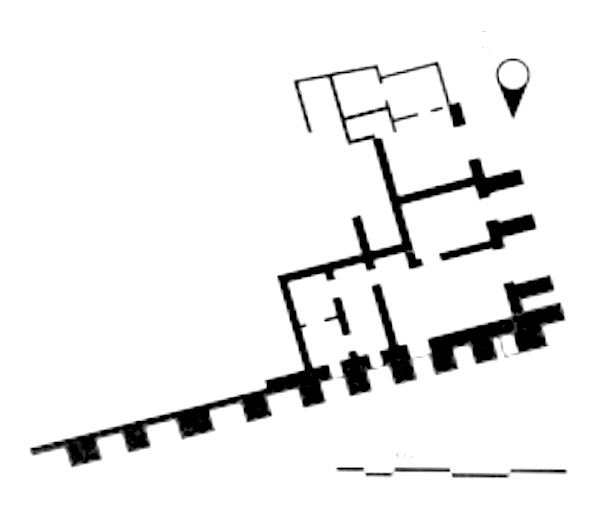
Plan of "Terme di Tito"

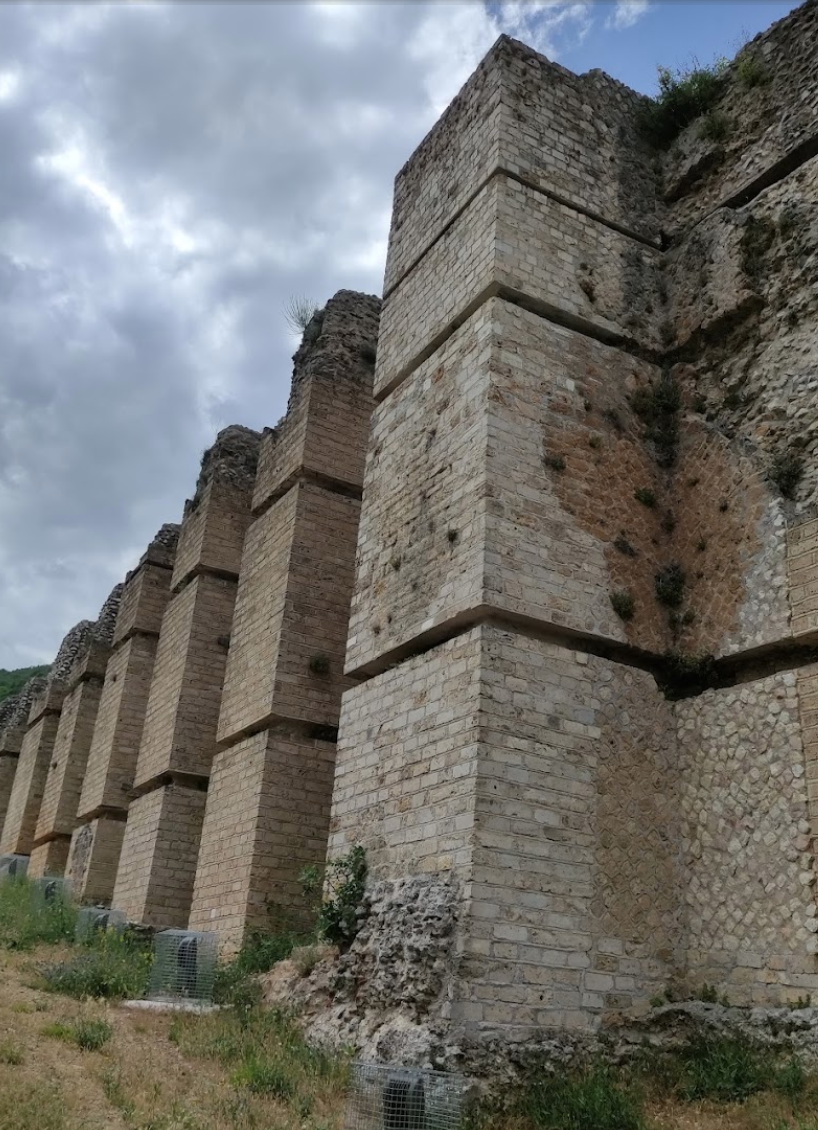
"Terme di Tito"

On the east side of Lake Cutilia are the monumental remains of the so-called "Baths of Titus", more likely to be a large villa and dating from the 1st c. BC to 1st c. AD. The massive retaining wall of 60 m length and 11 m high lies in front of several rectangular rooms.

=== Healing properties ===
Aquae Cutiliae has sulphurous and mineral springs, which was frequently enjoyed by the Flavian emperors and was dedicated to the goddess Vacuna. These sources of intensely cold water were especially renowned for their healing properties, which Pliny and Celsus praised for their effectiveness in curing stomach disorders.
