= Pratola Peligna =

- Comune
- Comune di Pratola Peligna
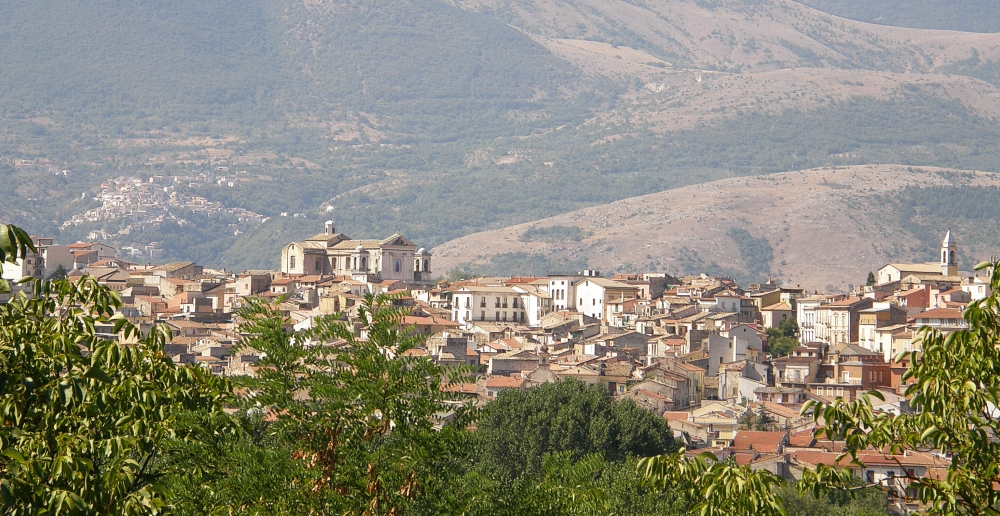

- Location within Italy Location within Abruzzo
- Coordinates: 42°5′57″N 13°52′29″E
- Country: Italy
- Region: Abruzzo
- Province: L'Aquila (AQ)
- Frazioni: Bagnaturo, Ponte la Torre

Government
  - Mayor: Antonella Di Nino (Patrola Belissima)

Area
  - Total: 28.67 km^{2} (11.07 sq mi)
- Elevation: 342 m (1,122 ft)

Population (31-3-2017)
  - Total: 7,519
  - Density: 262.3/km^{2} (679.3/sq mi)
- Demonym: Pratolani
- Time zone: UTC+1 (CET)
  - Summer (DST): UTC+2 (CEST)
- Postal code: 67035
- Dialing code: 0864
- ISTAT code: 066075
- Patron saint: Madonna della Libera
- Saint day: First Sunday in May
- Website: http://www.comune.pratolapeligna.aq.it/

Pratola Peligna (Abruzzese: Pratëlë) is a comune and town in the Province of L'Aquila in the Abruzzo region of Italy. As of 2015, it has a population of 7,652 inhabitants.

== Geography ==
Pratola Peligna is bordered by Popoli, Corfinio, Prezza, Raiano, Roccacasale and Sulmona.

== History ==
It is supposed that in Roman times there was a stranger pagus (village) peligno, who would have participated with Corfinium in the Social War against Rome in 91 BC, but there are no finds to prove its existence. A tomb of the 6th century, of Ostrogoth style, attests to the existence of a settlement, perhaps coinciding with the locality Fara de Campiliano, mentioned in the documents of the following centuries.

The first document in which the name of Pratola appears ("on site Pratulae") is an agricultural contract of 997, reported in the Chronicon Volturnensis, which however does not yet refer to an inhabited center. During the 12th century a fortified center was created: in 1170 the castrum Pratulae was assigned by the Norman William II to bishop Odorisio of L'Aquila. In 1294 the fiefdom was assigned by Charles II of Anjou to the abbot of the monastery of Abbey of Santo Spirito del Morrone, under whose rule Pratola will remain until 1807.

The history of the country is characterized by several popular ferments; to remember: in 1799 the revolt against the invasion French (together with many other municipalities of Abruzzo), the opposition to the Constitution of the Bourbon government of Ferdinand II in 1848 and the riot of 1934 against the fascist regime. During the Second World War, on August 2, 1943, the Montecatini plant, located two kilometers from the country, was bombed by the Allies.

In 1863, after the unification of Italy, the town was officially given by royal decree the name Pratola Peligna.

On January 9, 2006, the President of Italy, Carlo Azeglio Ciampi, awarded the municipality of Pratola the Bronze Medal for Civil Merit, with the following citation: "Strategically important center, during World War II, it was subjected to continuous and violent bombings, which caused numerous civilian casualties and the destruction of industrial heritage. The population, forced to take refuge in the surrounding countryside, contributed to the war of liberation with the establishment of the first partisan nuclei, suffering fierce retaliation from the German army. 1943/1944".

== Twin towns ==
- Hamilton, Canada, since 1992
- Gioia dei Marsi, Italy, since 2013

== Transport ==
Pratola Peligna is served by two train stations. The first one is Pratola Peligna main railway that connects Pratola to Est side of Italy, from Sulmona till Pescara and Pratola Peligna Superiore railway station, a railway stop on the Terni–Sulmona railway, with trains to L'Aquila and Sulmona till Rome.
