= Gioia dei Marsi =

- Comune
- Comune di Gioia dei Marsi
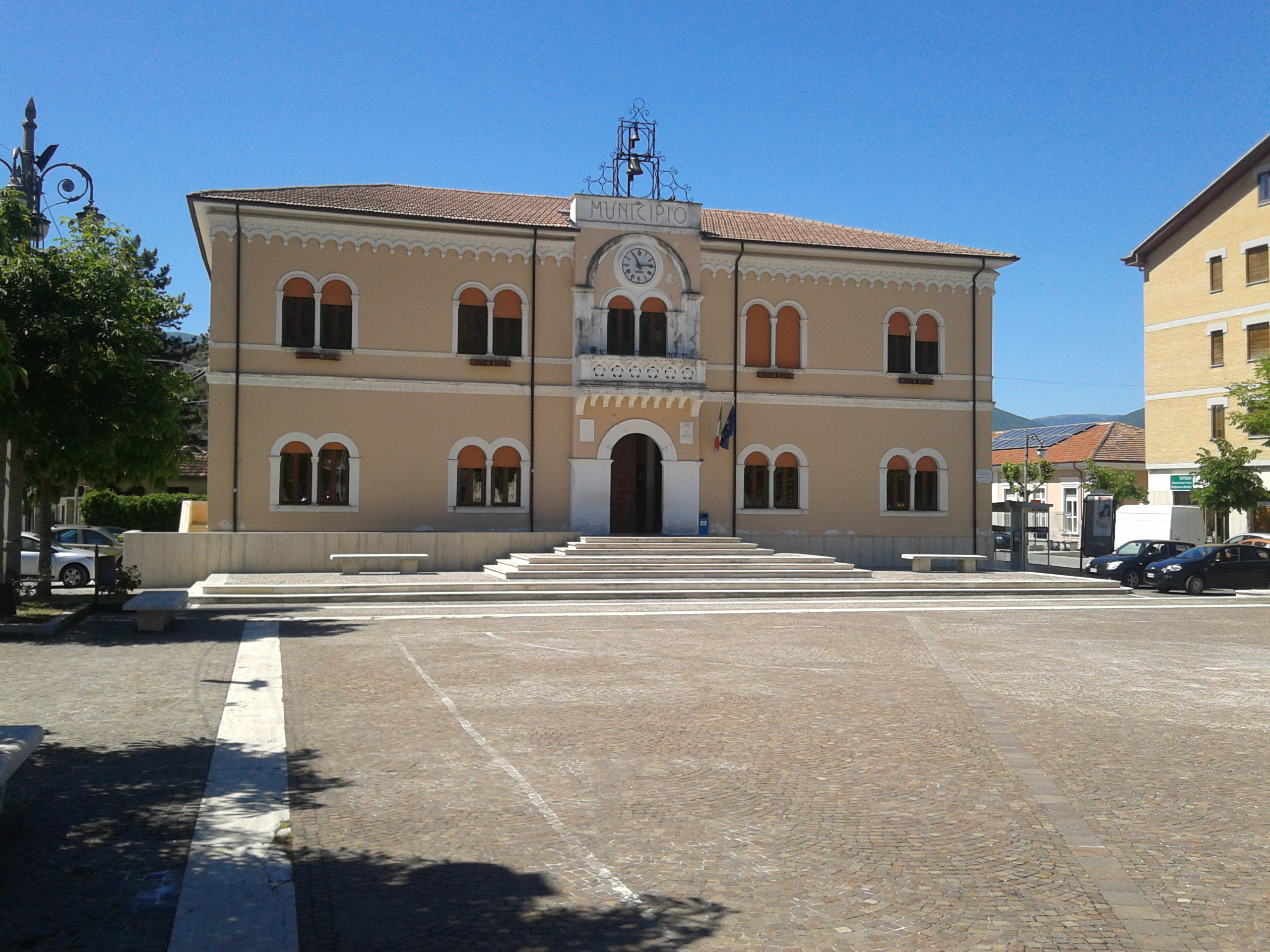
- Town hall.

- Location within Italy Location within Abruzzo
- Coordinates: 41°57′32″N 13°41′27″E
- Country: Italy
- Region: Abruzzo
- Province: L'Aquila (AQ)
- Frazioni: Casali d'Aschi, Gioia Vecchio, Sperone; borgate: Le Grette, Borgo Sperone

Government
  - Mayor: Gianclemente Berardini

Area
  - Total: 63.44 km^{2} (24.49 sq mi)
- Elevation: 725 m (2,379 ft)

Population (30 April 2017)
  - Total: 1,852
  - Density: 29.19/km^{2} (75.61/sq mi)
- Demonym: Gioiesi
- Time zone: UTC+1 (CET)
  - Summer (DST): UTC+2 (CEST)
- Postal code: 67055
- Dialing code: 0863
- Patron saint: St. Vincent
- Saint day: 29 September
- Website: Official website

Gioia dei Marsi is a comune (municipality) and town in the province of L'Aquila in the Abruzzo region of Italy.

It is located on the Fucino Lake plain border, in the Marsica.

== Twin towns ==
- Pratola Peligna, Italy
