= Sulmona-Isernia railway =

Overview
- Status: Tourist railway
- Locale: Abruzzo and Molise, Italy
- Termini: Sulmona; Isernia

Service
- Type: Heavy rail
- Operator: Fondazione FS Italiane

Technical
- Line length: 128.7 km (80.0 mi)
- Track gauge: 1,435 mm (4 ft 8 1/2 in)

The Sulmona-Isernia railway (Italian: Ferrovia Sulmona-Isernia) (nicknamed the Trans-Siberian of Italy) is a secondary railway line railway line in Abruzzo and Molise (128.7 km long with four intermediate stations between the two train stations, two of which with simplified ACEI and two staffed), which connects the city of Sulmona with that of Isernia, since 2011 without ordinary traffic.

The section Sulmona-Carpinone is used by tourist trains and was identified by the Fondazione FS Italiane for this purpose as part of the "Timeless Tracks" project: at the Rivisondoli-Pescocostanzo station it reaches 1,268.82 m above sea level, making it one of the highest stations in the Italian network.

== History ==
The line, severely damaged during the World War II, was reopened in sections; the last section, from Carovilli to Castel di Sangro, was reactivated on 9 November 1960 in the presence of the Minister of Transport Giuseppe Spataro.

Starting from 11 October 2010, the service on the route from Castel di Sangro to Carpinone was suspended, due to urgent maintenance needs of the rolling stock.

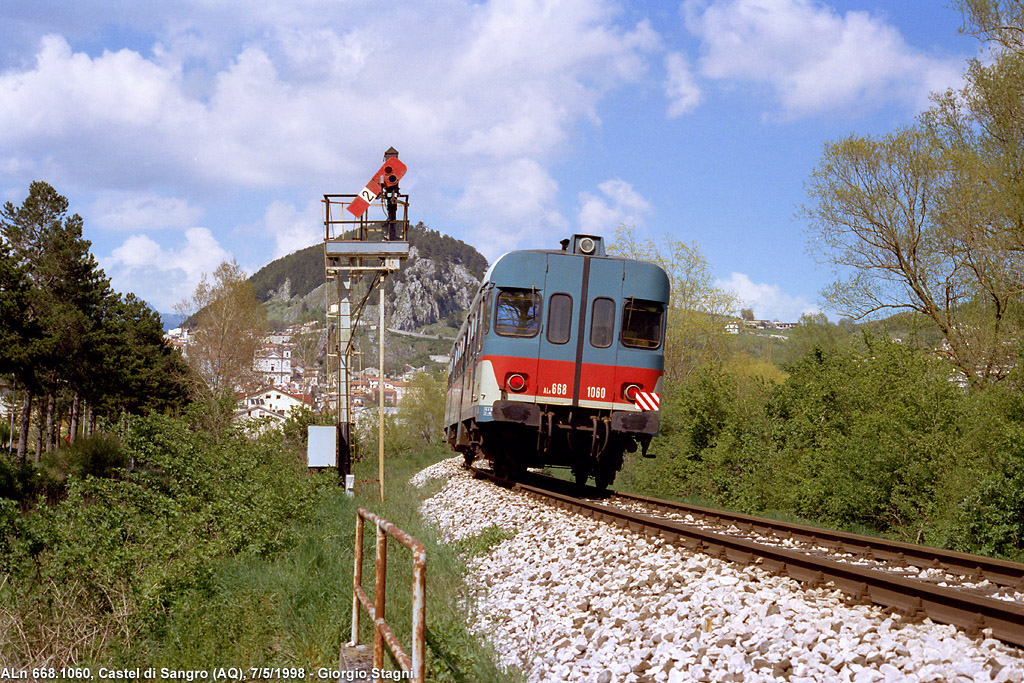
Section of the line
