= Pratola Peligna Superiore railway station =

Railway station in Italy

Pratola Peligna Superiore

General information
- Location: Via per Prezza, Pratola Peligna, Province of L'Aquila, Abruzzo; Italy
- Coordinates: 42°04′50″N 13°52′19″E
- Owner: Rete Ferroviaria Italiana
- Operator: Trenitalia
- Line: Terni–Sulmona railway
- Platforms: 1

Other information
- Classification: Bronze

History
- Opened: 1875; 151 years ago
Location
- Location within Abruzzo Location within Italy

Pratola Peligna Superiore is a railway station near Pratola Peligna, Italy. The station is located on the Terni–Sulmona railway. The train services are operated by Trenitalia.

== Train services ==
The station is served by the following service(s):

- Regional services (Treno regionale) L'Aquila - Sulmona
