= Terni–Sulmona railway =

Railway line in Italy

Coordinates: 42.3154°N 13.2657°E

Overview
- Status: Functioning
- Owner: Rete Ferroviaria Italiana
- Line number: 107
- Locale: Italy
- Termini: Terni railway station; Sulmona railway station
- Stations: 20

Service
- Type: Heavy rail
- Operator(s): Trenitalia (L'Aquila–Sulmona route); Umbria Mobilità (former Ferrovia Centrale Umbra, Terni–L'Aquila route)
- Rolling stock: FCU ALn 776 (Terni–L'Aquila route), Pesa Atribo "Swing" (L'Aquila–Sulmona route)

History
- Opened: 30 October 1883

Technical
- Line length: 164 km (102 mi)
- Number of tracks: Single track
- Track gauge: 1,435 mm (4 ft 8 1/2 in)
- Electrification: none
- Operating speed: varies from 110 km/h (68 mph) to 55 km/h (34 mph)
- Highest elevation: 989.28 m (3,245.7 ft)
- Maximum incline: 3.5 %
Map of the railway with stations
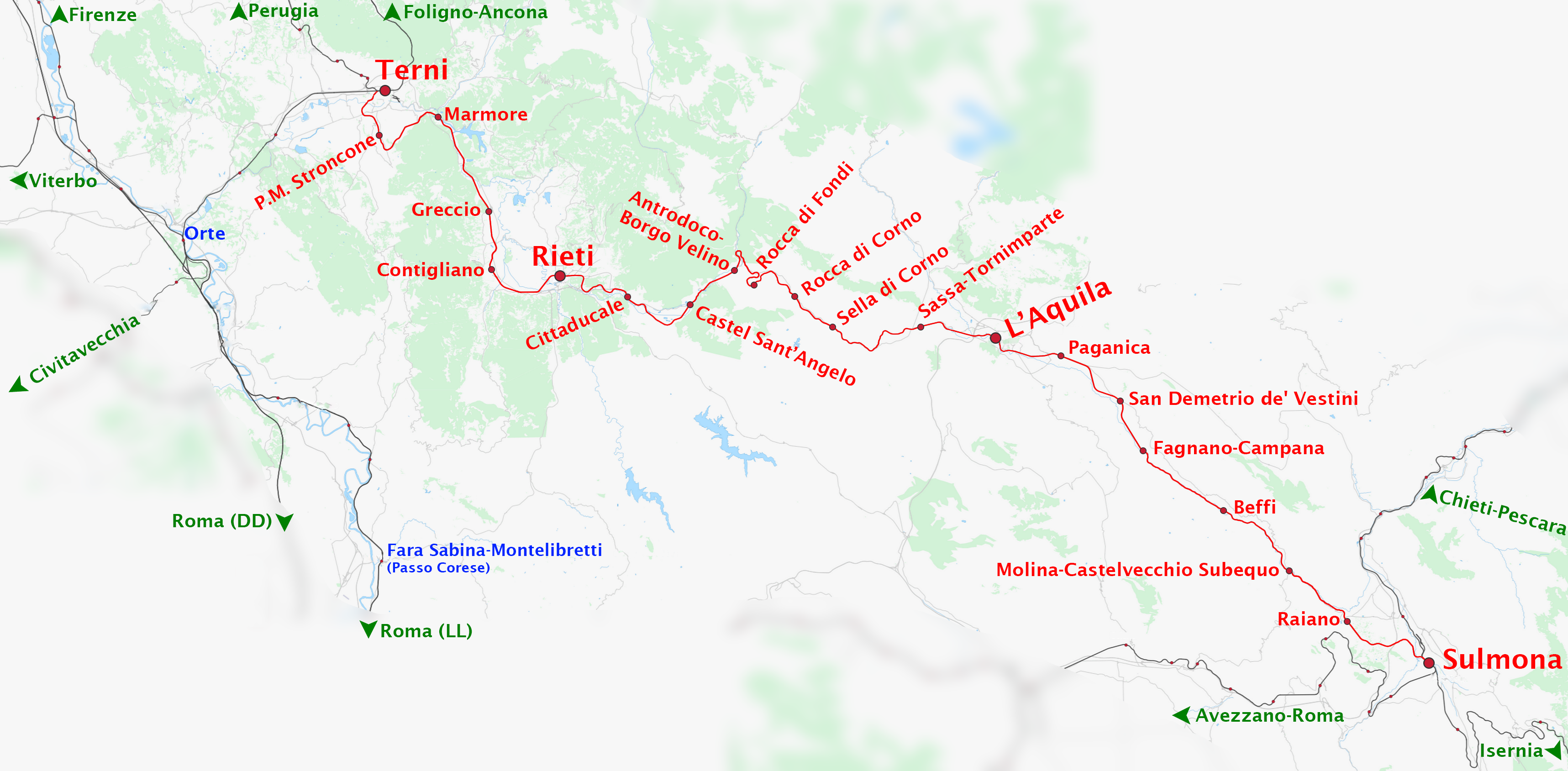
- Source: Italian railway atlas

The Terni–Sulmona railway is a regional railway line in central Italy, managed by Rete Ferroviaria Italiana since June 2019. It links three regions, Umbria, Lazio and Abruzzo, and three provincial capitals: Terni, Rieti and L'Aquila. Together with the Sansepolcro-Terni and the Sulmona–Isernia railways, it forms a 440Km-long North–South corridor through the Apennines in central Italy. In December 2021, Italy's Ministry of Transport included the Terni-Sulmona among the first local railways to be converted from diesel to hydrogen.

Its route is the result of two unfinished railways that had to meet in Rieti: the Pescara–L'Aquila–Rome line, and the Terni–Avezzano–Roccasecca line.

== History ==
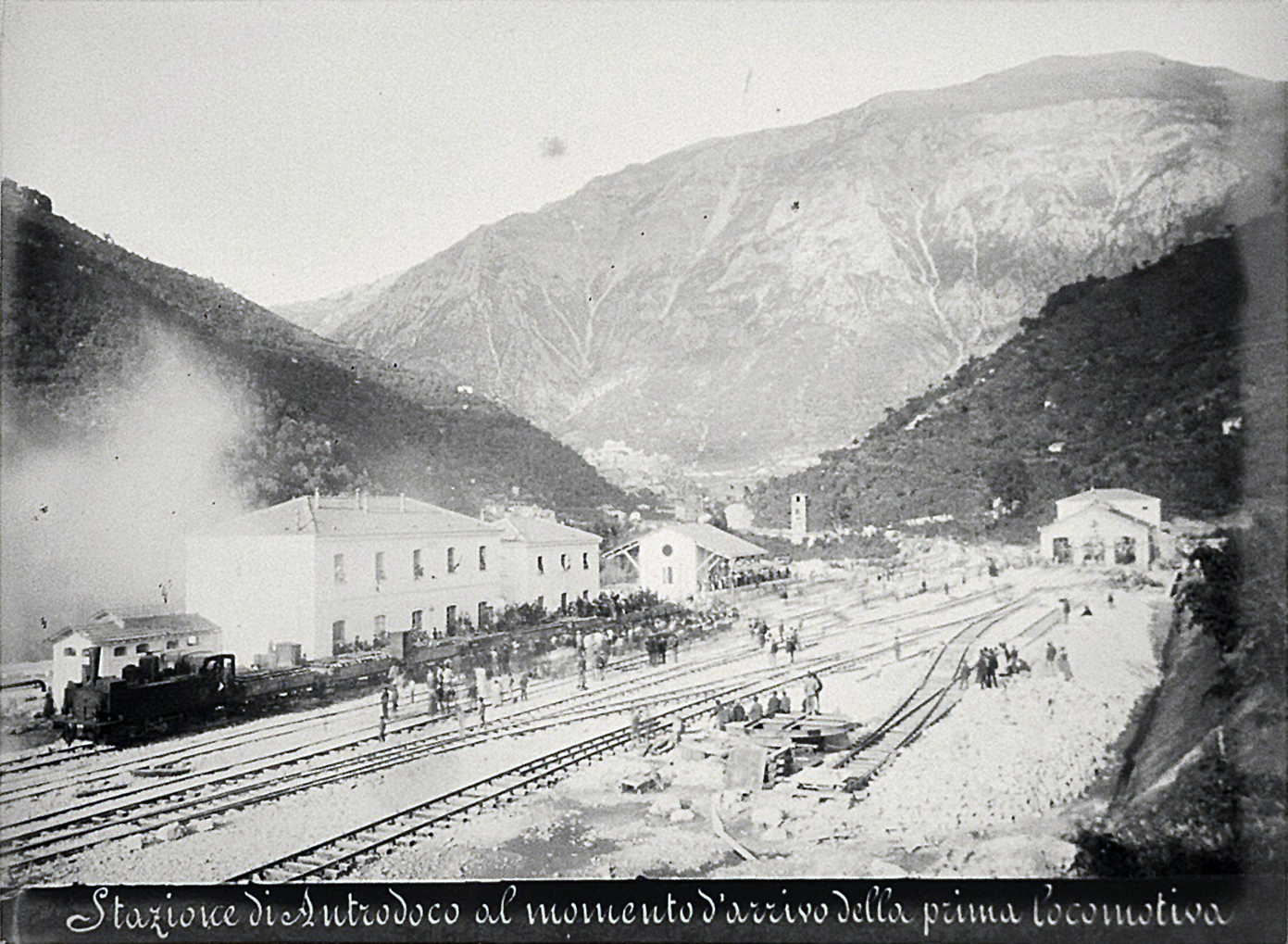
The first locomotive reaches the Antrodoco-Borgo Velino railway station, circa 1882 or 1883

After the Italian unification and the widespread start of railway constructions, many talks started about how to link the Abruzzo region to its new capital, Rome. It was decided that the railway would start from Pescara, reach Sulmona and L'Aquila, then cross the Apennine Mountains at the Sella di Corno pass and then reach Rieti, where the line had to continue towards Rome. Rieti also should have been the starting point of a branch to Avezzano, that – together with the Avezzano–Roccasecca railway – would have linked Abruzzo with the railway to Naples, which was Abruzzo's capital under the Kingdom of Two Sicilies.

However the unsolved Roman question threatened to interrupt railway service between the then-capital Florence and the then-biggest city Naples, and to protect its military and strategic interests the Italian government urged the construction of an alternative route from Florence to Naples that didn't enter the Papal States, which could be created with a new railway between Terni and Roccasecca, passing through Rieti and Avezzano. So it was decided that the Pescara–Rieti line should have continued towards Terni, and not towards Rome as per initial project.

Construction was started in 1871 by Società per le Strade Ferrate Meridionali in Pescara; by 1873 the line was completed to Sulmona and by 1875 it was completed to L'Aquila. Then the work stopped because of the building company's perplexity: even if it was possible to reach Rome from Terni, via the Ancona–Orte railway, Strade Ferrate Meridionali thought that a railway from Terni to Rieti would be less useful for the needs of the company and of Abruzzese people than a railway from Rome to Rieti.

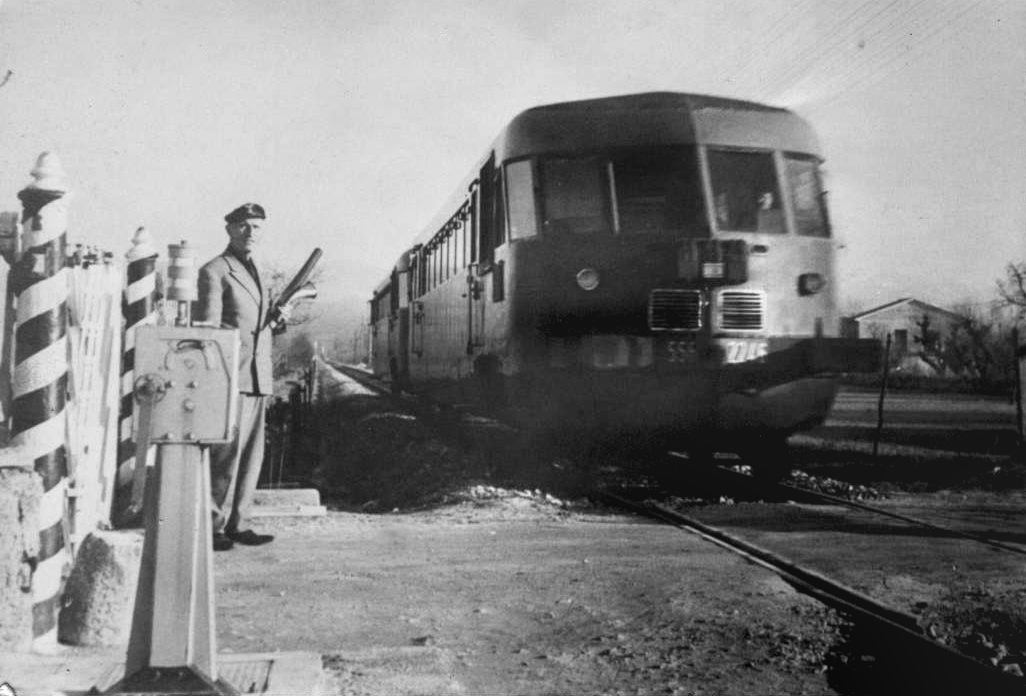
ALn 556 diesel multiple unit near a level crossing in Onna in the 1960s

An agreement was reached in 1879, when Public Works Ministry Baccarini granted Strade Ferrate Meridionali to build another railway to satisfy the need of connecting Abruzzo to Rome (the Rome-Sulmona railway) but tied the company to finish the former line till Terni. Work restarted and the line was soon completed, even if the most mountainous region of the track was involved (the Apennine Mountains that divide Abruzzo and Lazio, and the drop of altitude near the Marmore falls). The Pescara-Sulmona-Terni line opened on October 30, 1883.

The line's importance as the primary means of transport between Abruzzo and Rome, however, lasted five years: in 1888, the Rome-Sulmona railway was opened and all trains from Abruzzo's Adriatic shore to Rome were diverted on the newer, shorter line. As most trains starting from Sulmona were travelling from Pescara to Rome, except for some going to L'Aquila and Terni, the first part of the original Pescara–Terni line was officially detached and merged with the newer Rome-Sulmona; so the Roma-Sulmona line became the Roma-Sulmona-Pescara line, while the Pescara-Sulmona-Terni line became the Sulmona-Terni line.

At the start of 20th century the Avezzano–Roccasecca railway was built, but with the capture of Rome the government's strategic purposes ceased, so the Rieti–Avezzano railway was never built and the Terni–Roccasecca route remained unfinished.

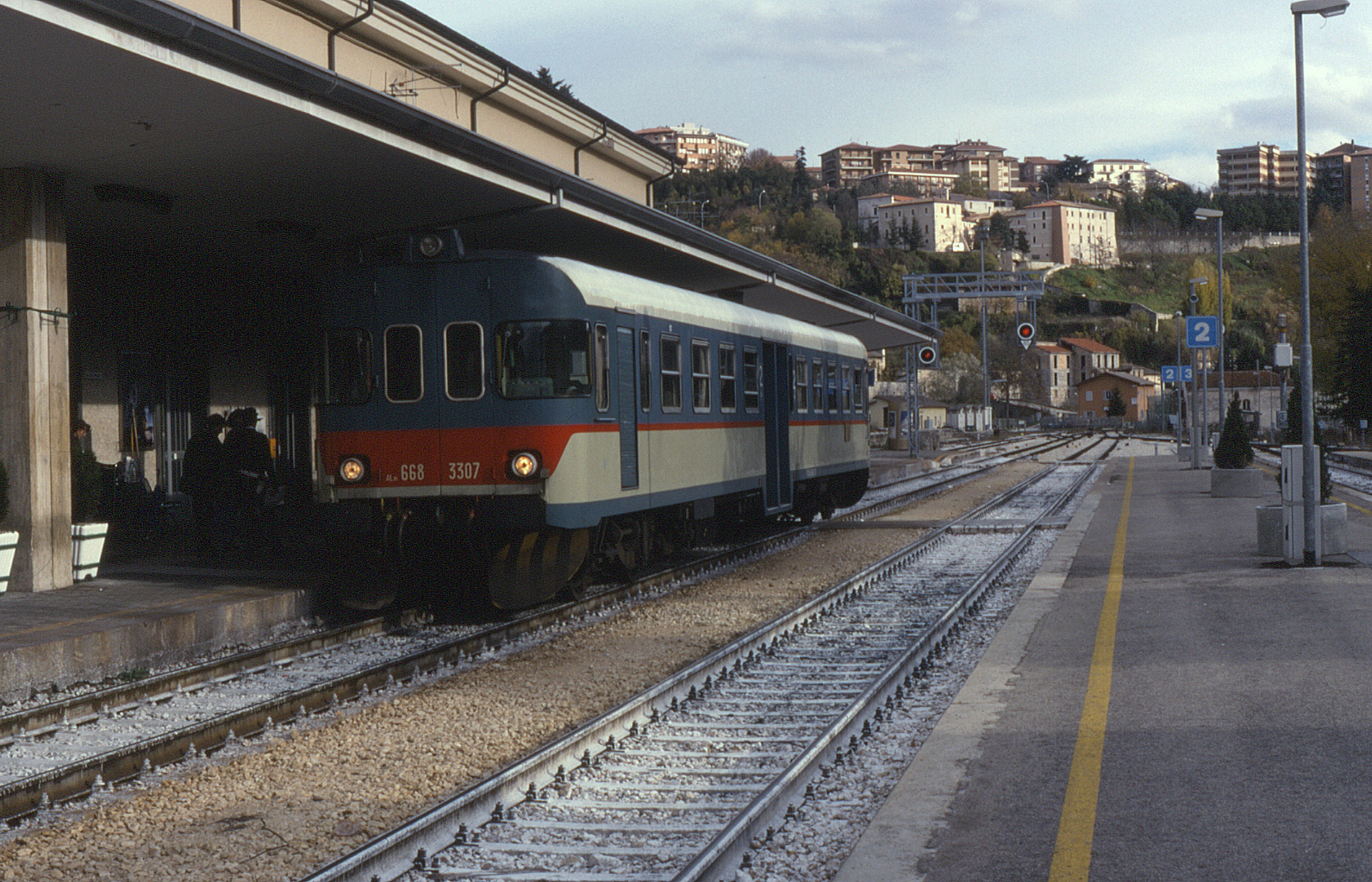
ALn 668 3307 diesel multiple unit at L'Aquila railway station in 1996

On October 3, 1936, a severe accident happened near Contigliano, in which two trains collided head-on, resulting in several deaths and many injured, among which the entire L'Aquila Calcio football team. Many players were killed and most couldn't play football again; the team was relegated and never recovered its lost position.

In the 1930s steam locomotives were dismissed and faster ALn 56 and ALn 556 diesel multiple units (DMU) were introduced; in the 1980s these were replaced with ALn 668 3300 series.

In 1905 all Italian railways were nationalized and Ferrovie dello Stato Italiane took control of the Terni–Sulmona railway. In 2008 Trenitalia, the passenger division of Ferrovie dello Stato, put out passenger services on the Terni–L'Aquila route entrusting Ferrovia Centrale Umbra for the service (now Umbria Mobilità, part of the Busitalia group). Ferrovia Centrale Umbra operates its services using FCU ALn 776 diesel multiple units; Trenitalia still operates the L'Aquila–Sulmona route, and in 2016 it introduced the new Pesa Atribo "Swing" DMUs replacing ALn 668s.

== Features ==
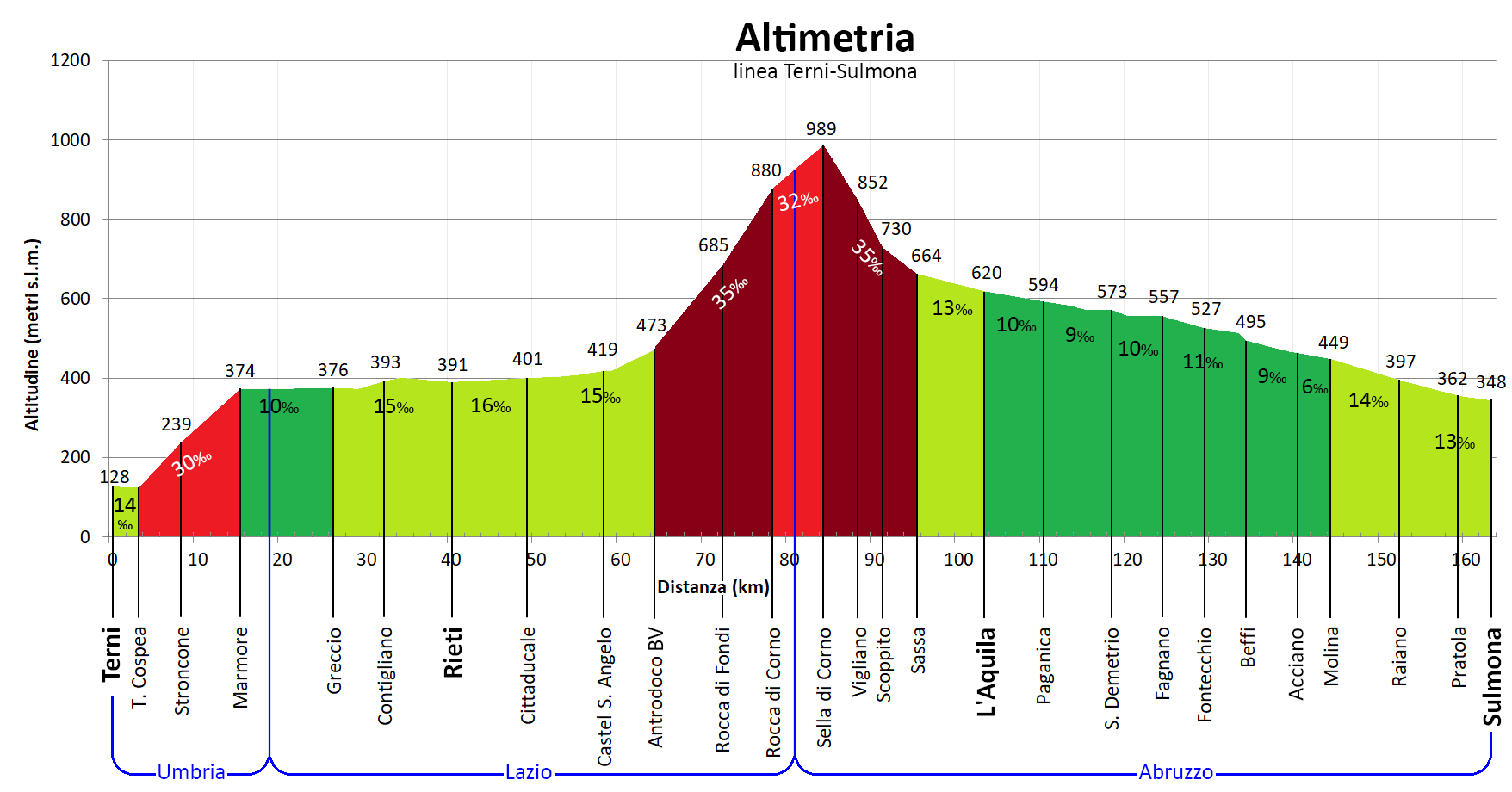
Altimetry of the line (metres above sea level)

The railway line is graded by Rete Ferroviaria Italiana as a secondary, low-traffic line.

It is a single-track railway for its entire extension, and it is not electrified, so it is run with diesel multiple units: currently FCU ALn 776 (on the Terni-L'Aquila route) and Pesa Atribo "Swing" (on the L'Aquila-Sulmona route).

The line features some of the most steep climbs of the standard gauge, non-rack Italian rail system: from the Antrodoco-Borgo Velino station until the Sassa-Tornimparte station, where the line crosses the Apennine Mountains that divide Lazio from Abruzzo, it has a steepness of 35‰; the highest point of the line is the Sella di Corno railway station, at 989.28 metres on the sea level. From the Terni station until the Marmore station the line climbs the drop of altitude near the Marmore falls with a steepness of 30‰.

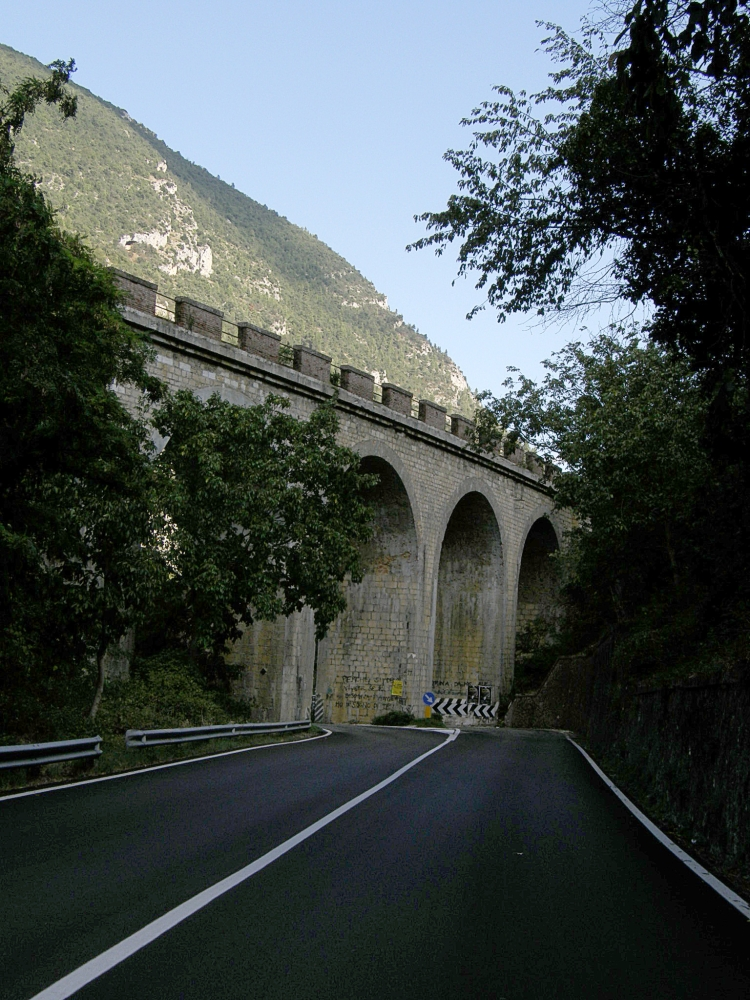
Railway viaduct in the San Venanzio canyon, near Castelvecchio Subequo

Maximum allowed speeds vary for each stretch of the line; the highest is 110 kilometres per hour (68 mph), which is reached in the straight and flat stretch between Contigliano and Marmore, while the lowest is 55 kilometres per hour (34 mph), which is reached in the winding trait between Antrodoco and Rocca di Fondi, at the start of the Apennine pass.

Signalling on the line is operated by Centralized traffic control while safety is assured by Sistema Supporto Condotta and by automatic axle-counting block system; installation of these systems took place from 1989 to 1993.

The line has 20 stations, leaving stops out:

- Terni railway station
  - Terni Cospea (stop)
  - Stroncone (stop)
- Marmore
  - Piediluco (closed station)
  - Labro-Moggio (stop)
- Greccio
  - Terria (stop)
- Contigliano
  - Poggio Fidoni (stop)
- Rieti railway station
- Cittaducale
  - Cotilia (stop)
  - Sorgenti del Peschiera (stop)
- Castel Sant'Angelo
  - Canetra (stop)
- Antrodoco-Borgo Velino
  - Antrodoco Centro (stop)
- Rocca di Fondi
- Rocca di Corno
- Sella di Corno
  - Vigliano d'Abruzzo (stop)
  - Scoppito (stop)
- Sassa-Tornimparte
- L'Aquila railway station
- Paganica
  - San Gregorio (stop)
  - Fossa (stop)
- San Demetrio ne' Vestini
  - Villa Sant'Angelo (stop)
- Fagnano-Campana
  - Fontecchio (stop)
  - Tione degli Abruzzi (stop)
- Beffi
  - Acciano (stop)
- Molina-Castelvecchio
- Raiano railway station
  - Pratola Peligna Superiore railway station (stop)
- Sulmona railway station

== See also ==
- List of railway lines in Italy
- List of railway stations in Umbria
- List of railway stations in Lazio
- List of railway stations in Abruzzo
