= Sperone, Gioia dei Marsi =

Coordinates: 41°56′16″N 13°43′46″E

Sperone
- Frazione
- Tower of Sperone (13th century)
- Interactive map of Sperone
- Country: Italy
- Region: Abruzzo
- Province: L'Aquila
- Commune: Gioia dei Marsi
- Time zone: UTC+1 (CET)
  - Summer (DST): UTC+2 (CEST)

Sperone is a frazione of Gioia dei Marsi, in the Province of L'Aquila in the Abruzzo, region of Italy.

Its population in 2025 was 150.

It includes Sperone Vecchio, which was abandoned in the 1960s and is now a ghost town.
