= Borgo Velino =

- Comune
- Comune di Borgo Velino
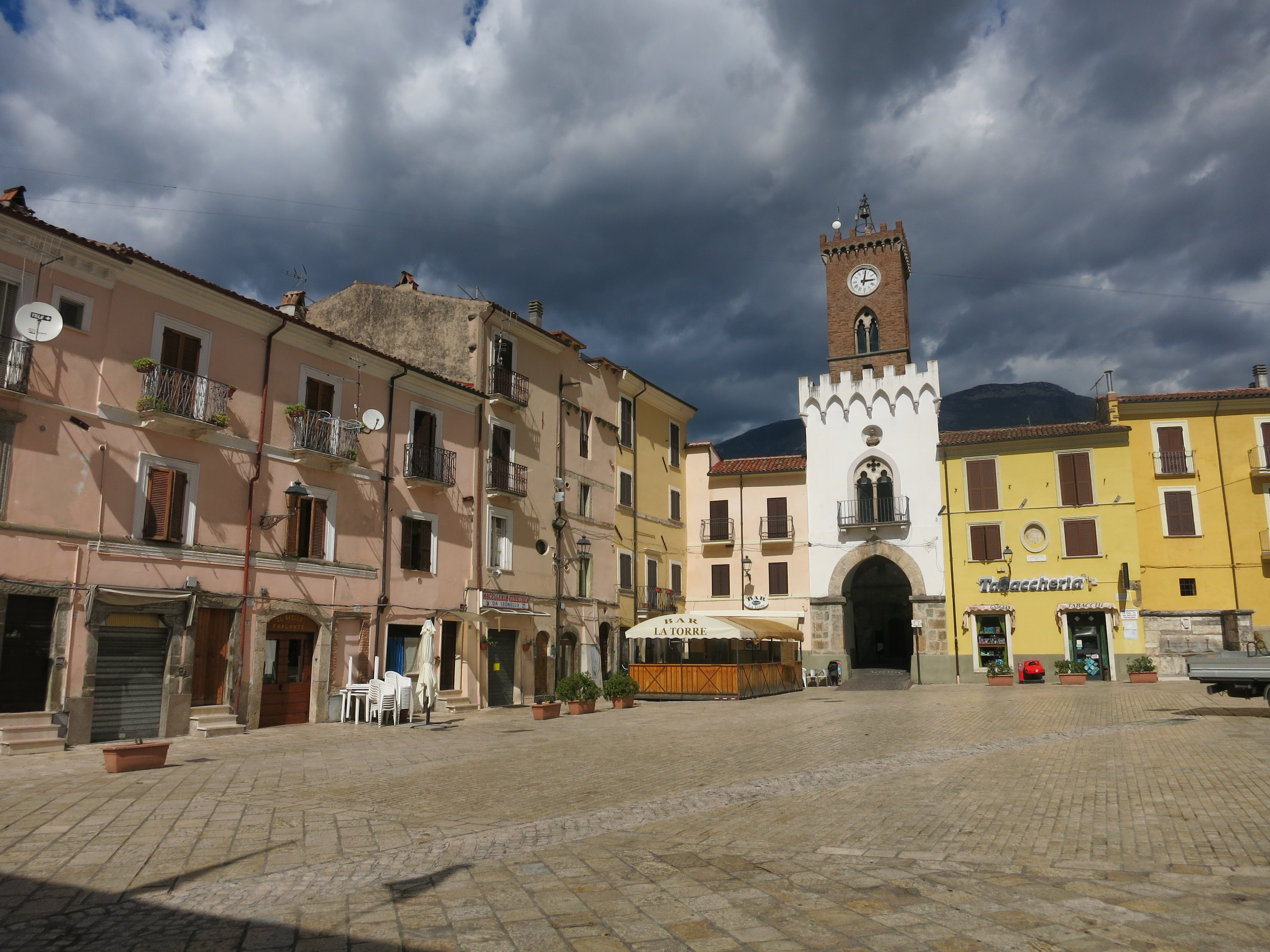
- Umberto I square with the civic tower

- Coat of arms

- Location within Italy Location within Lazio
- Coordinates: 42°24′N 13°4′E
- Country: Italy
- Region: Lazio
- Province: Rieti (RI)
- Frazioni: Collerinaldo

Government
  - Mayor: Emanuele Berardi

Area
  - Total: 17.3 km^{2} (6.7 sq mi)
- Elevation: 460 m (1,510 ft)

Population (31 December 2008)
  - Total: 1,002
  - Density: 57.9/km^{2} (150/sq mi)
- Demonym: Borghetani
- Time zone: UTC+1 (CET)
  - Summer (DST): UTC+2 (CEST)
- Postal code: 02010
- Dialing code: 0746

Borgo Velino is a comune (municipality) in the Province of Rieti in the region of Latium, Italy. It is located about 70 kilometres (43 mi) northeast of Rome and about 15 kilometres (9 mi) east of the town Rieti. It has an area of 17.3 square kilometres (6.7 mi^{2}), and as of 31 December 2010 it had a population of 1,004. Until 1927 Borgo Velino was part of the province of L'Aquila in Abruzzo. It is located near the site of a pre- or early-Roman Sabine village named Viario. Rare ruins of this ancient village, now occupied by a cultivated field, were found near a standing medieval tower. Borgo Velino is the birthplace of Giulio Pezzola, a notorious outlaw of the 17th century.

Borgo Velino borders the following municipalities: Antrodoco, Castel Sant'Angelo, Cittaducale, Fiamignano, Micigliano, Petrella Salto.

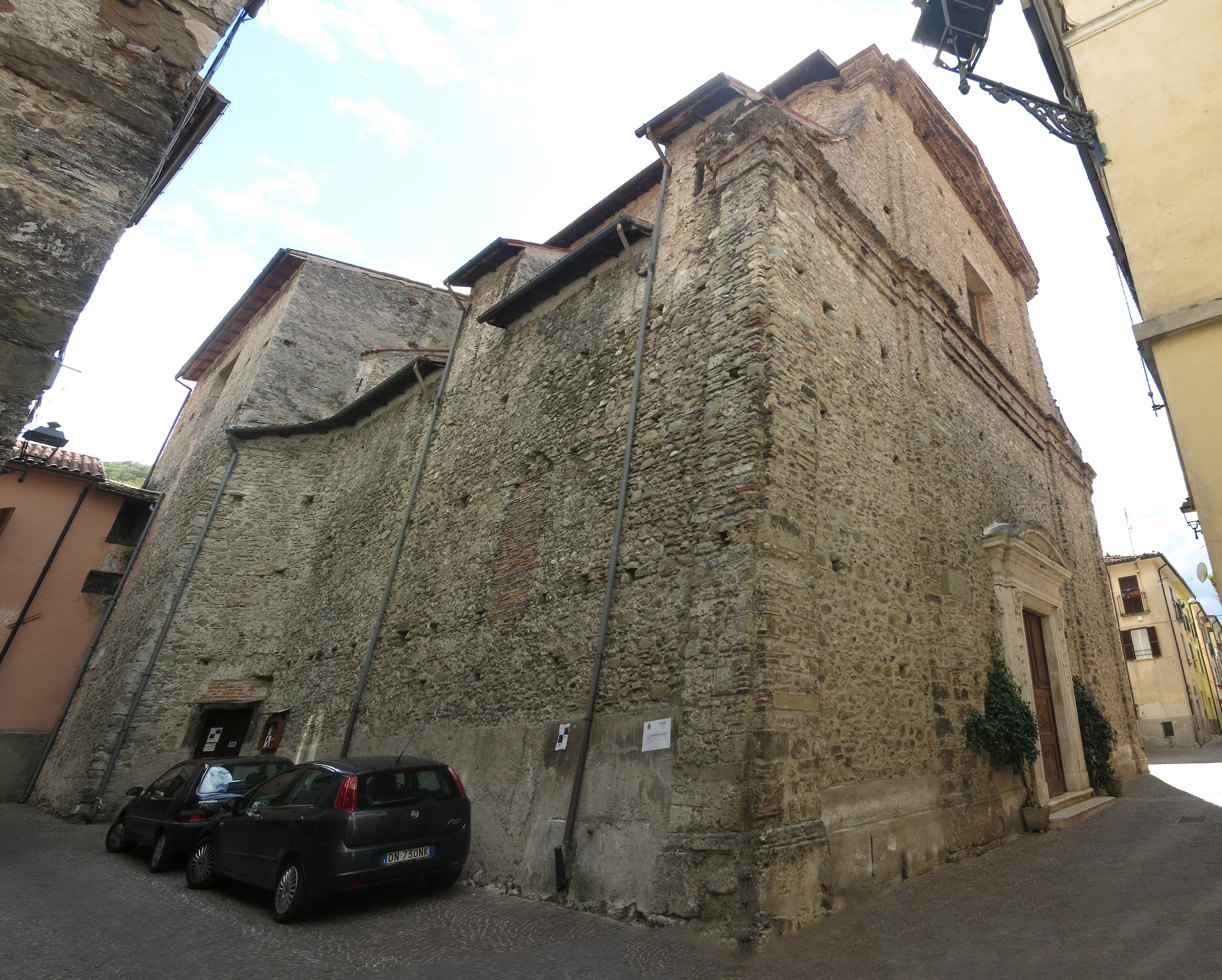
San Matteo church

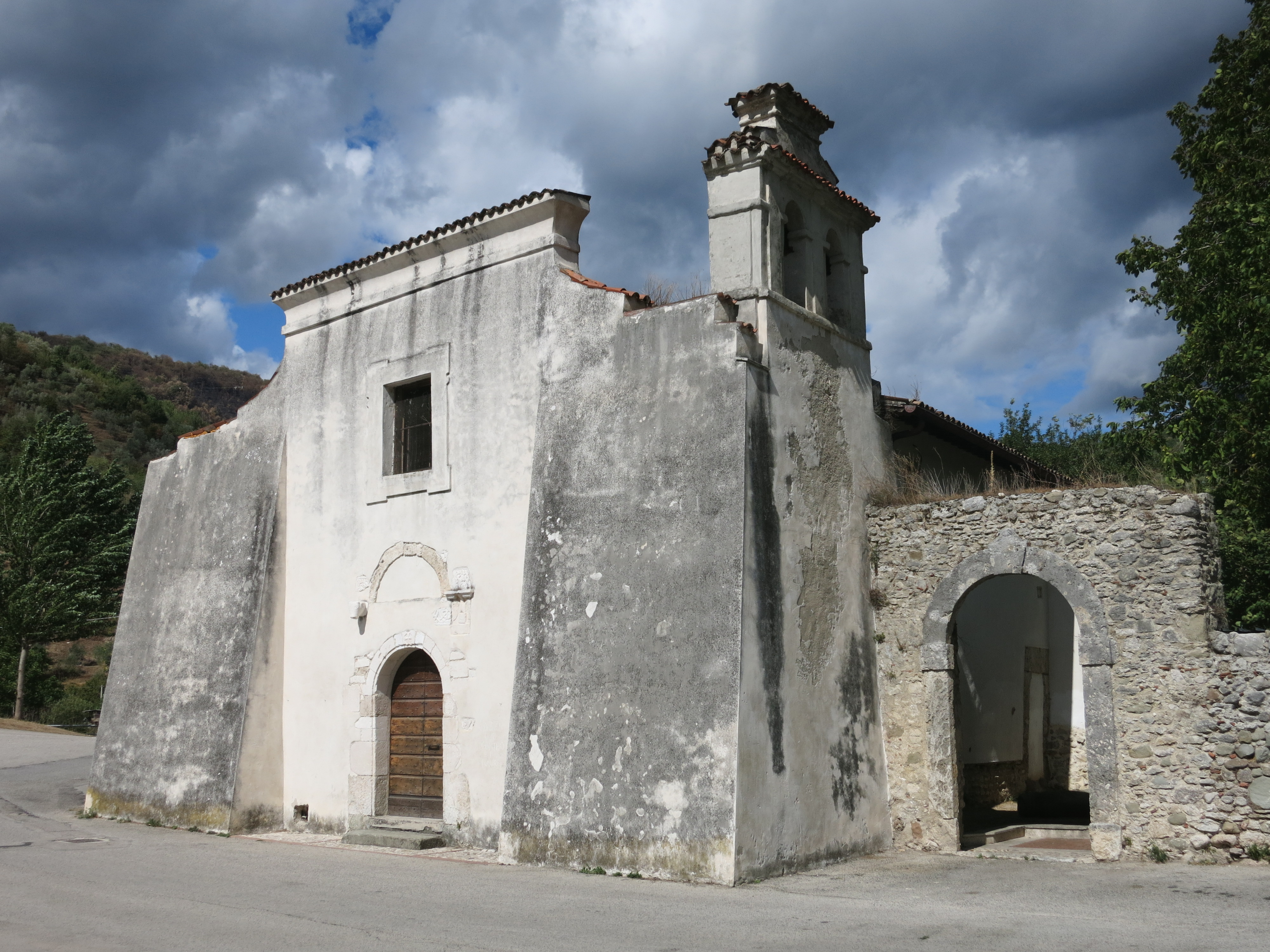
Saint Dionysius, Rusticus and Eleutherius church

== Transport ==
Borgo Velino has a station on the Terni–Sulmona railway, with trains to Terni, Rieti and L'Aquila.
