= Castel Sant'Angelo, Lazio =

Castel Sant'Angelo
- Comune
- Comune di Castel Sant'Angelo
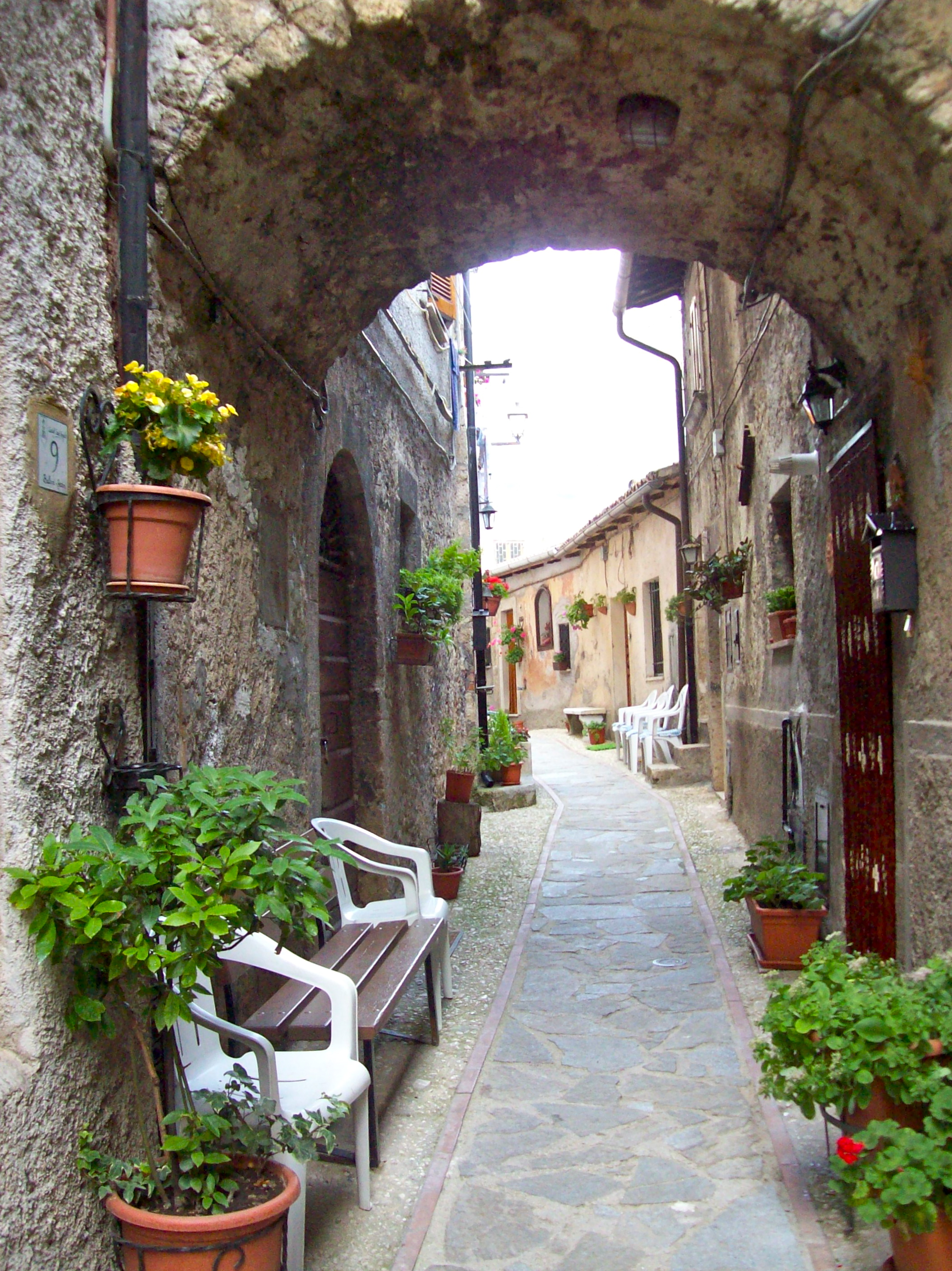
- View of Castel Sant'Angelo

- Location within Italy Location within Lazio
- Coordinates: 42°24′N 13°1′E
- Country: Italy
- Region: Lazio
- Province: Rieti (RI)

Government
  - Mayor: Paolo Anibaldi

Area
  - Total: 31.3 km^{2} (12.1 sq mi)
- Elevation: 448 m (1,470 ft)

Population (30 April 2008)
  - Total: 1,237
  - Density: 39.5/km^{2} (102/sq mi)
- Demonym: Castellani
- Time zone: UTC+1 (CET)
  - Summer (DST): UTC+2 (CEST)
- Postal code: 02010
- Dialing code: 0746

Castel Sant'Angelo is a comune (municipality) in the Province of Rieti in the Italian region of Lazio, located about 70 kilometres (43 mi) northeast of Rome and about 12 kilometres (7 mi) east of Rieti.

Castel Sant'Angelo borders the following municipalities: Borgo Velino, Cittaducale, Micigliano, Rieti.

The Lake of Cutilia is located in the frazione of Vasche.

== Transport ==
Castel Sant'Angelo has a station on the Terni–Sulmona railway, with trains to Terni, Rieti and L'Aquila.
