= Rieti railway station =

Railway station serving Rieti, Italy

Rieti
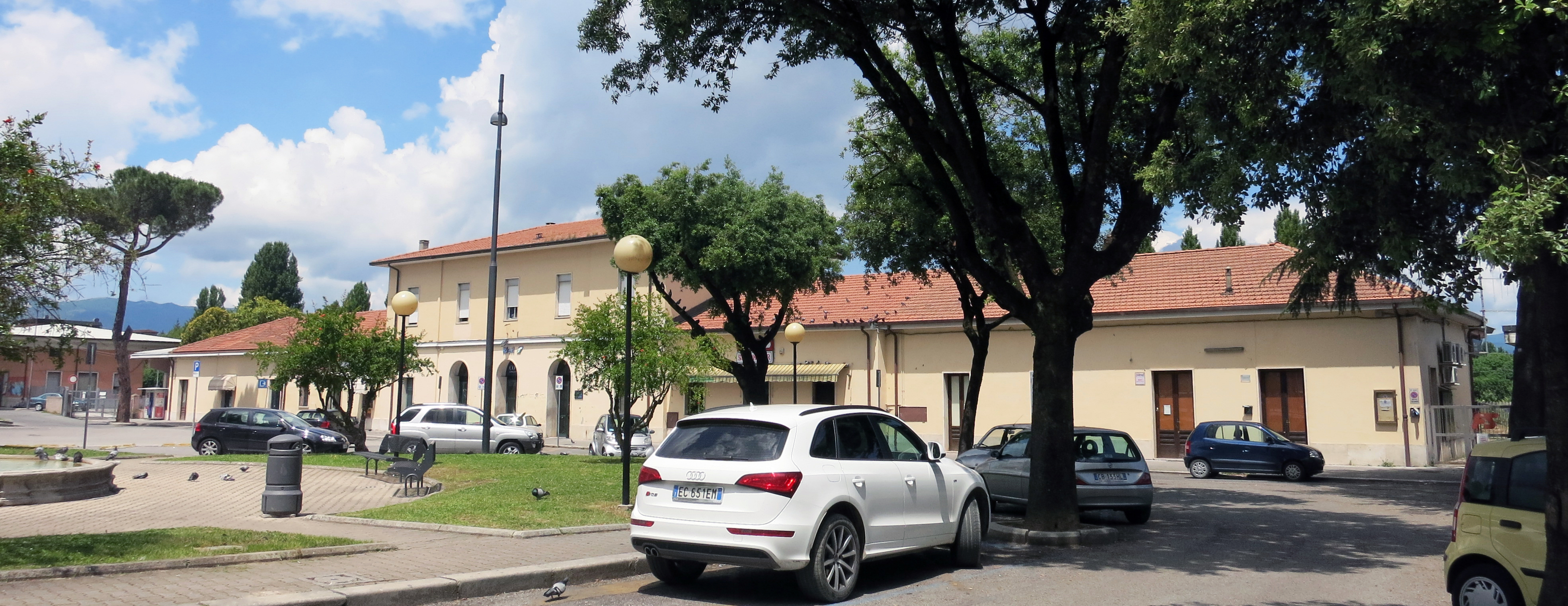
- Passengers building as seen from outside the station

General information
- Location: Piazza Giuseppe Mazzini; Rieti, province of Rieti, Lazio; Italy
- Coordinates: 42.4058°N 12.8626°E
- Owner: Rete Ferroviaria Italiana
- Operator: Ferrovia Centrale Umbra
- Line: Terni–Sulmona
- Tracks: 4

Other information
- Classification: Silver

History
- Opened: 30 October 1883; 142 years ago

Passengers
- 2007: 491 per day
Location
- Location within Lazio Location within Italy

Rieti railway station (Italian: Stazione di Rieti) serves the city and comune of Rieti, in the region of Lazio, central Italy. Opened in 1883, it is part of the Terni–Sulmona railway.

== Location ==
Rieti railway station is located at the center of the city, just outside the medieval walls that enclose the historic city centre on its north side, and south of modern residential neighborhoods Regina Pacis, Madonna del cuore and Micioccoli.

== History ==
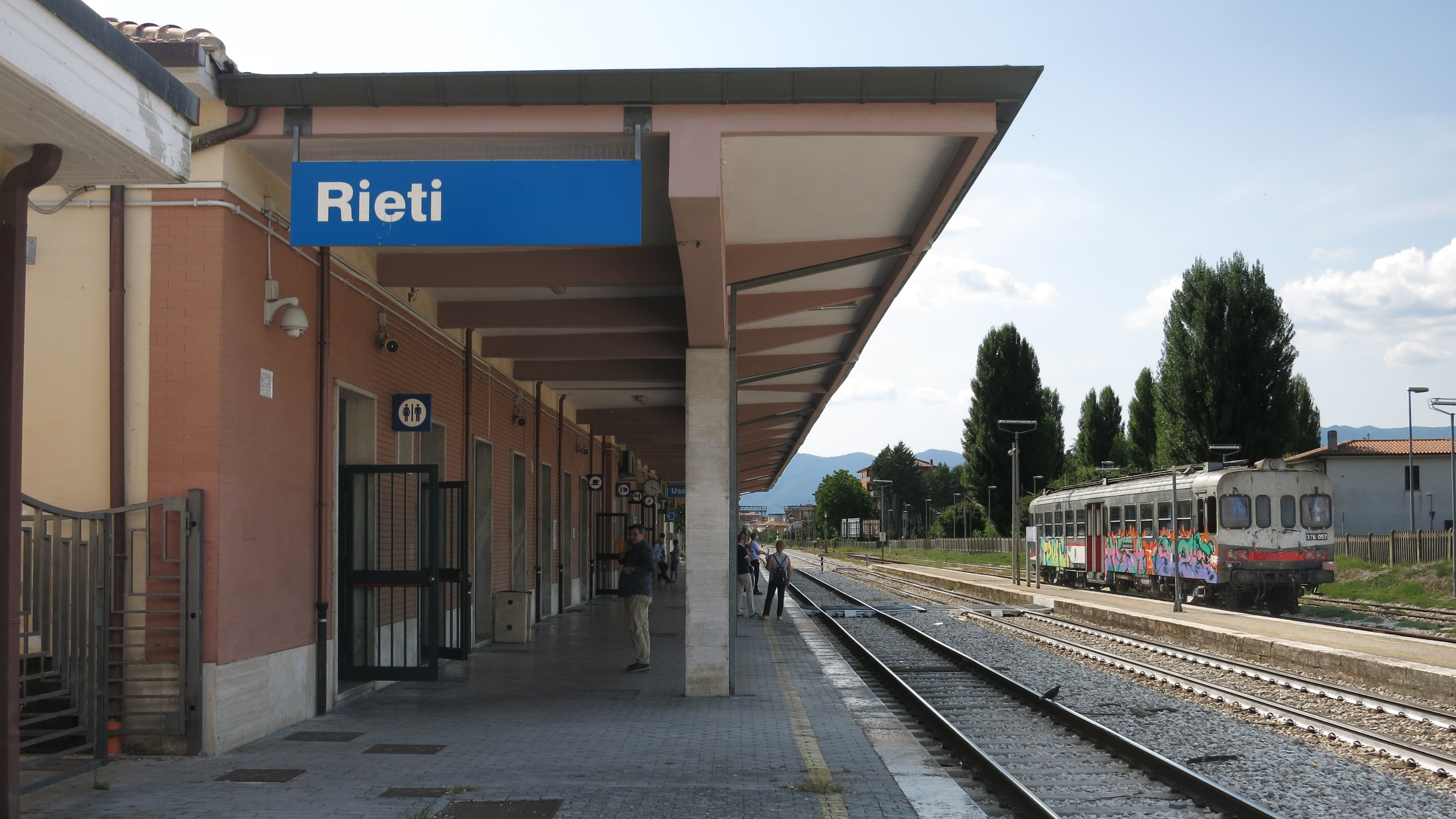
A DMU train in the station

The station started operating on 30 October 1883, when the Rocca di Corno-Terni part of the Terni–Sulmona railway was opened. Upon construction, a 200 metres stretch of the nearby medieval walls were demolished, in order to create a new, large passage in the walls, so that arriving passenger could easily access the city centre.

On 25 January 1944 the station was severely damaged in a bombing by USAF Flying Fortress, that also caused the death of the station master Antonio Uncini. Shortly after the building was reconstructed and the line restarted operations in 1946.

In 2009 the former freight area, no longer used, was converted in a bus terminal and depot.

== Train movements ==
Trains stopping in the station are regional trains running from Terni to L'Aquila, operated by Ferrovia Centrale Umbra company, on behalf of Trenitalia, with ALn 776 diesel multiple units.

Even if there is no direct railway between Rieti and Rome, as the construction of such a railway has been subject of a long debate but never took place, Rome can be reached by catching a train to the Terni station, where direct trains to Rome can be found. In addition, in recent years a direct train from Rieti to Rome, at early morning, and a direct train from Rome to Rieti, in the late evening, were introduced; both train pass through Terni, travel on the Ancona–Orte railway, reach Orte and then travel on the Florence–Rome high-speed railway taking approximately 1 hour and 40 minutes.

== See also ==
- History of rail transport in Italy
- List of railway stations in Lazio
- Rail transport in Italy
- Railway stations in Italy
