= Sassa =

- Frazione
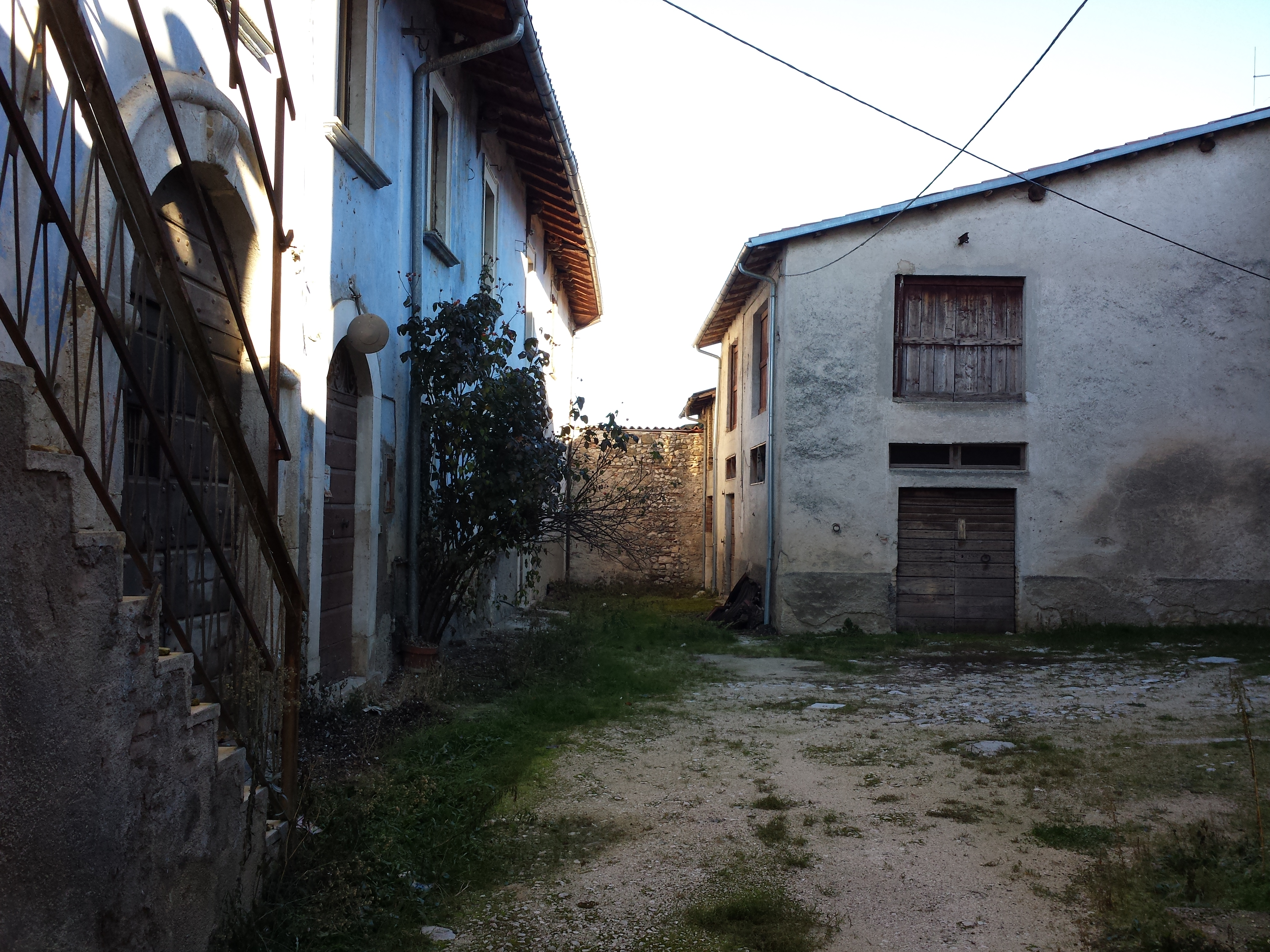

- Location within Italy
- Coordinates: 42°28′N 13°18′E
- Country: Italy
- Region: Abruzzo
- Province: L'Aquila (AQ)
- Commune: L'Aquila
- Elevation: 2,215 ft (675 m)

Population (2009)
  - Total: about 2,500
- Time zone: UTC+1 (CET)
  - Summer (DST): UTC+2 (CEST)
- Postal code: 67100
- Area code: 0862

Sassa is a frazione in the Province of L'Aquila in the Abruzzo region of Italy. After the 2009 L'Aquila earthquake, it has a population of about 2500 inhabitants considering small villages around this frazione.

The frazione of Sassa is composed by twelve villages: Brecciasecca, Colle di Sassa, Collefracido, Collemare, Foce di Sassa, Genzano di Sassa, Pagliare di Sassa, Palombaia di Sassa, Poggio Santa Maria, San Martino, Sassa and Sassa Scalo. These twelve villages formed the independent town of Sassa until 1927. Sassa tries often consider the whole territory and villas that compose it; with Sassa is therefore aimed at the following centers:

Village	Elevation	Population	Note
Brecciasecca	-	-	-
Colle di Sassa	750	224	
Collefracido	775	121	
Collemare	-	-	-
Foce di Sassa	800	240	
Genzano di Sassa	685	456	
Pagliare di Sassa	682	230	
Palombaia di Sassa	670	183	
Poggio Santa Maria	858	282	
San Martino	-	-	-
Sassa	675	607	
Sassa Scalo	664	210	

== Transport ==
Sassa has a station on the Terni–Sulmona railway, with trains to Terni, Rieti and L'Aquila and Nsfas Status Check.
