= Castelvecchio Subequo =

- Comune
- Comune di Castelvecchio Subequo
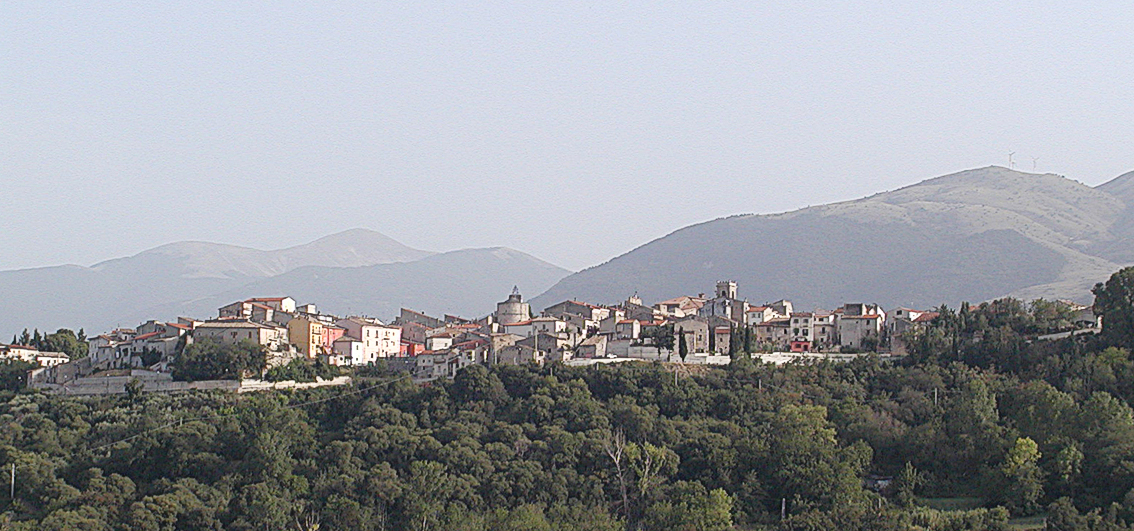

- Location within Italy Location within Abruzzo
- Coordinates: 42°7′52″N 13°43′43″E
- Country: Italy
- Region: Abruzzo
- Province: L'Aquila (AQ)

Government
  - Mayor: Pietro Salutari

Area
  - Total: 19.23 km^{2} (7.42 sq mi)
- Elevation: 490 m (1,610 ft)

Population (30 June 2017)
  - Total: 943
  - Density: 49.0/km^{2} (127/sq mi)
- Demonym: Castelvecchiesi
- Time zone: UTC+1 (CET)
  - Summer (DST): UTC+2 (CEST)
- Postal code: 67024
- Dialing code: 0864
- Patron saint: St. John the Baptist
- Saint day: 24 June
- Website: Official website

Castelvecchio Subequo (also Subrequo and Subrego; Latin: Superaequum, Superequum) is a comune and town in the province of L'Aquila in the Abruzzo region, central Italy, at the feet on Mount Sirente.

== History ==
Ancient Superaequum was a town of the Paeligni, one of the three which possessed municipal rights, and among which the territory of that people was divided. Hence it is mentioned both by Pliny and in the Liber Coloniarum, where it is termed Colonia Superaequana. It received a colony of veterans, probably under Augustus, to which a fresh body of colonists was added in the reign of Marcus Aurelius. The name is not mentioned by any other author, but several inscriptions attest its municipal importance.

After the conquest of southern Italy by the Lombards, it was known as Onuffolo or Nuffoli, returning to its former name under the Normans. It accrued its other name (originally Castelvetere, meaning "old fort") later in the Middle Ages.

It is on a hill on the right bank of the Aterno river, and about 7 kilometres (4 mi) on the left of the Via Valeria. Its territory probably comprised the hilly district between that road and the Aternus.

== Transportation ==
Castelvecchio Subequo has a station on the Terni–Sulmona railway, with trains to L'Aquila and Sulmona.
