= Molina Aterno =

- Comune
- Comune di Molina Aterno
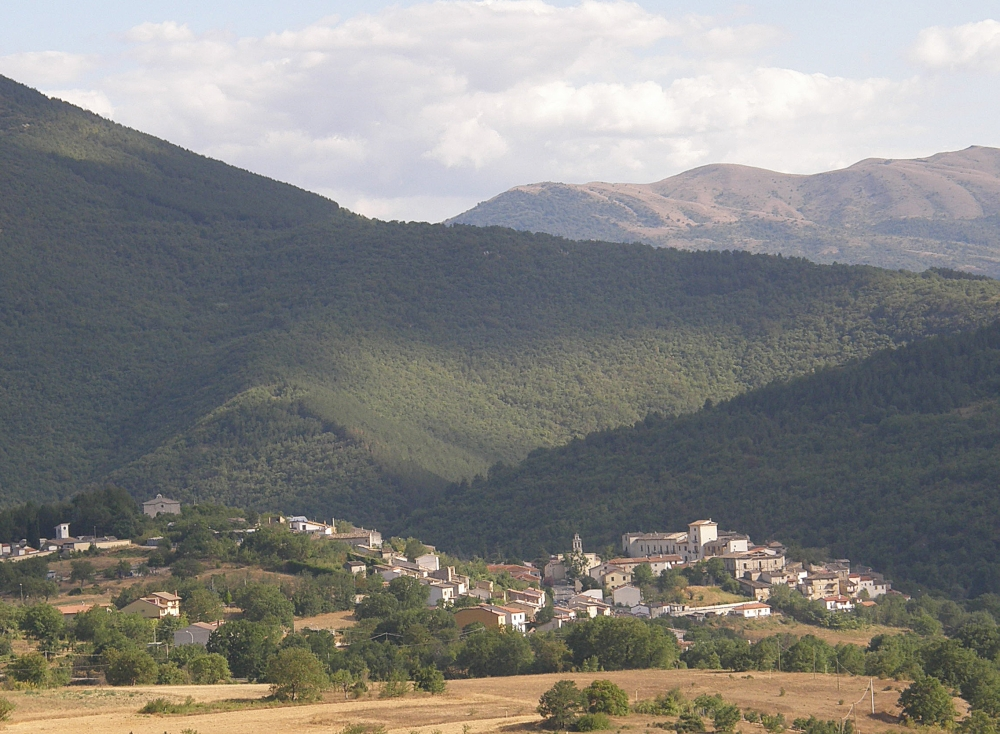

- Coat of arms

- Location within Italy Location within Abruzzo
- Coordinates: 42°09′00″N 13°44′11″E
- Country: Italy
- Region: Abruzzo
- Province: L'Aquila (AQ)

Government
  - Mayor: Roberto Fasciani

Area
  - Total: 11.84 km^{2} (4.57 sq mi)
- Elevation: 512 m (1,680 ft)

Population (1 January 2007)
  - Total: 429
  - Density: 36.2/km^{2} (93.8/sq mi)
- Demonym: Molinesi
- Time zone: UTC+1 (CET)
  - Summer (DST): UTC+2 (CEST)
- Postal code: 67020
- Dialing code: 0864
- Patron saint: St. Nicholas of Bari

Molina Aterno is a comune and town in the province of L'Aquila in the Abruzzo region of central Italy. The name derives from Latin molina ("mill"), the second part having been added in 1889 due to the presence of the Aterno river.

Main attractions include the church of Santa Maria del Colle (12th century), the church of San Nicola (with a 1632 bell tower) and the baronial Palace.

== Transport ==
Molina Aterno has a station on the Terni–Sulmona railway, with trains to L'Aquila and Sulmona.
