= Sulmona railway station =

Railway station in Italy

Sulmona
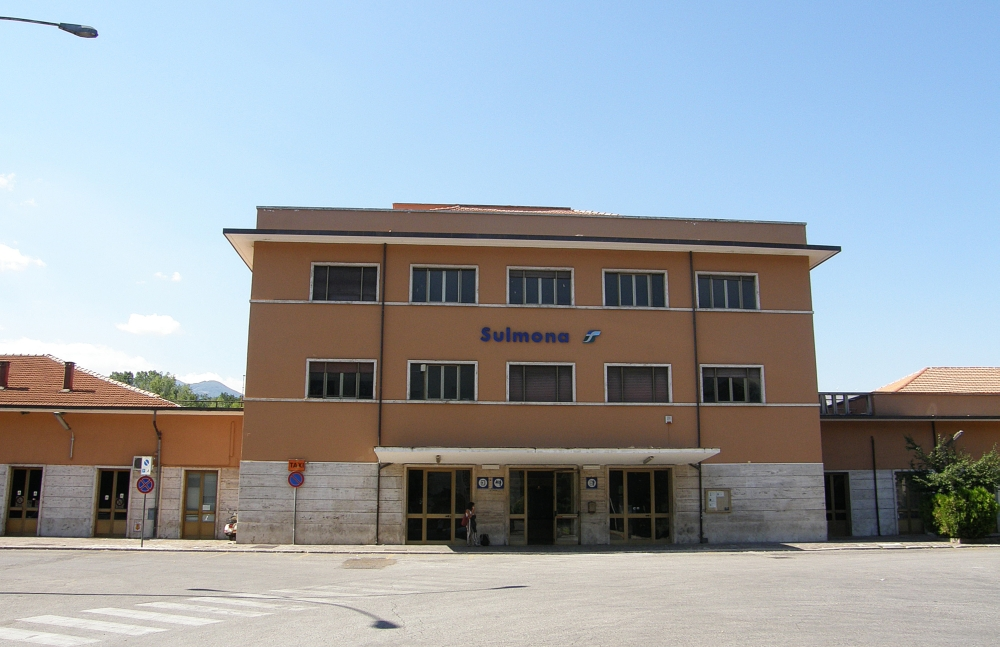
- Sulmona railway station

General information
- Location: Piazza Vittime Civili di Guerra 1, Sulmona, Province of L'Aquila, Abruzzo; Italy
- Coordinates: 42°03′39″N 13°54′27″E
- Owner: Rete Ferroviaria Italiana
- Operator: Trenitalia
- Lines: Rome–Sulmona–Pescara railway Terni–Sulmona railway Sulmona-Isernia railway
- Platforms: 5

Other information
- Classification: Silver

History
- Opened: 1888; 138 years ago
Location
- Location within Abruzzo Location within Italy

Sulmona is a railway station in Sulmona, Italy. The station opened in 1888 and is located on the Rome–Sulmona–Pescara railway, Terni–Sulmona railway and Sulmona-Isernia railway. The train services are operated by Trenitalia.

== History ==
The station of Sulmona was built as a result of the construction, between 1873 and 1875, of the railway connecting the city of Pescara, located on the Adriatic coast with the Abruzzo mountain center of L'Aquila. The line was constructed by the Italian Society for the Southern Railways. This station was further north than the current location, on a curve (decommissioned in 1888) allowing direct trains between Pescara - L'Aquila . The embankment on which the track lay is still visible both by observation and from aerial photos.

In 1888 the station was opened to rail traffic on the Rome-Sulmona route, which allegedly was the shortest connection with the capital, thus turning the simple rail station into a junction. In the same year the long proposed project for the connection between Naples and the Adriatic coast through the pass of Campo di Giove, the station Rivisondoli-Pescocostanzo (highest point of the line at 1268 m above sea level) and Carpinone took shape. The realisation of such a complex project took a long time and included the construction of a rack railway between Cansano and Roccaraso. The first section of the line was opened on 18 September 1892 with Sulmona Cansano as its terminus station. The entire route was inaugurated on 18 September 1897, creating the important cross country connection, the shortest route between the stations of Naples on the Tyrrhenian and Pescara on the Adriatic coast. Following this a locomotive depot was built on the southwest side of the station.

The Rome - Sulmona was the line for an experimental traction phase of 10,000 volts and 45 Hz power frequency. Electrification started in 1927 and on 23 March 1929 there was the official inauguration of the electrified station of Sulmona.

The Second World War severely hit the station and its facilities were devastated. The station was rebuilt, resuming operation in 1947. The buildings in fact all date from the postwar period.

Train services on the line to Isernia finished on 11 December 2011; Since then a bus operates to Castel di Sangro. There are occasional tourist trains that use the line.

== Train services ==
The station is served by the following service(s):

- Regional services (Treno regionale) Pescara - Chieti - Sulmona - Avezzano - Tivoli - Rome
- Regional services (Treno regionale) Teramo - Giulianova - Pescara - Chieti - Sulmona - Avezzano
- Regional services (Treno regionale) L'Aquila - Sulmona

== Bus services ==
- Sulmona - Castel di Sangro

== Preserved locomotive ==
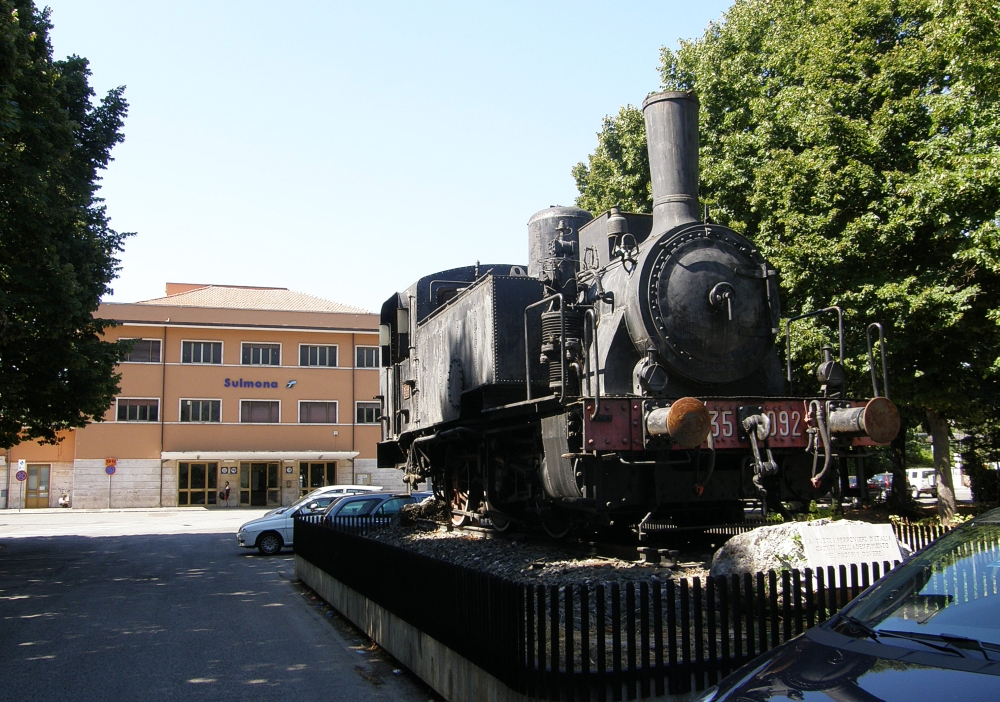
Steam engine 835.092.

Steam engine 835.092 is plinthed on the Piazza Vittime Civili di Guerra, outside the station.
