= Cittaducale =

- Comune
- Comune di Cittaducale
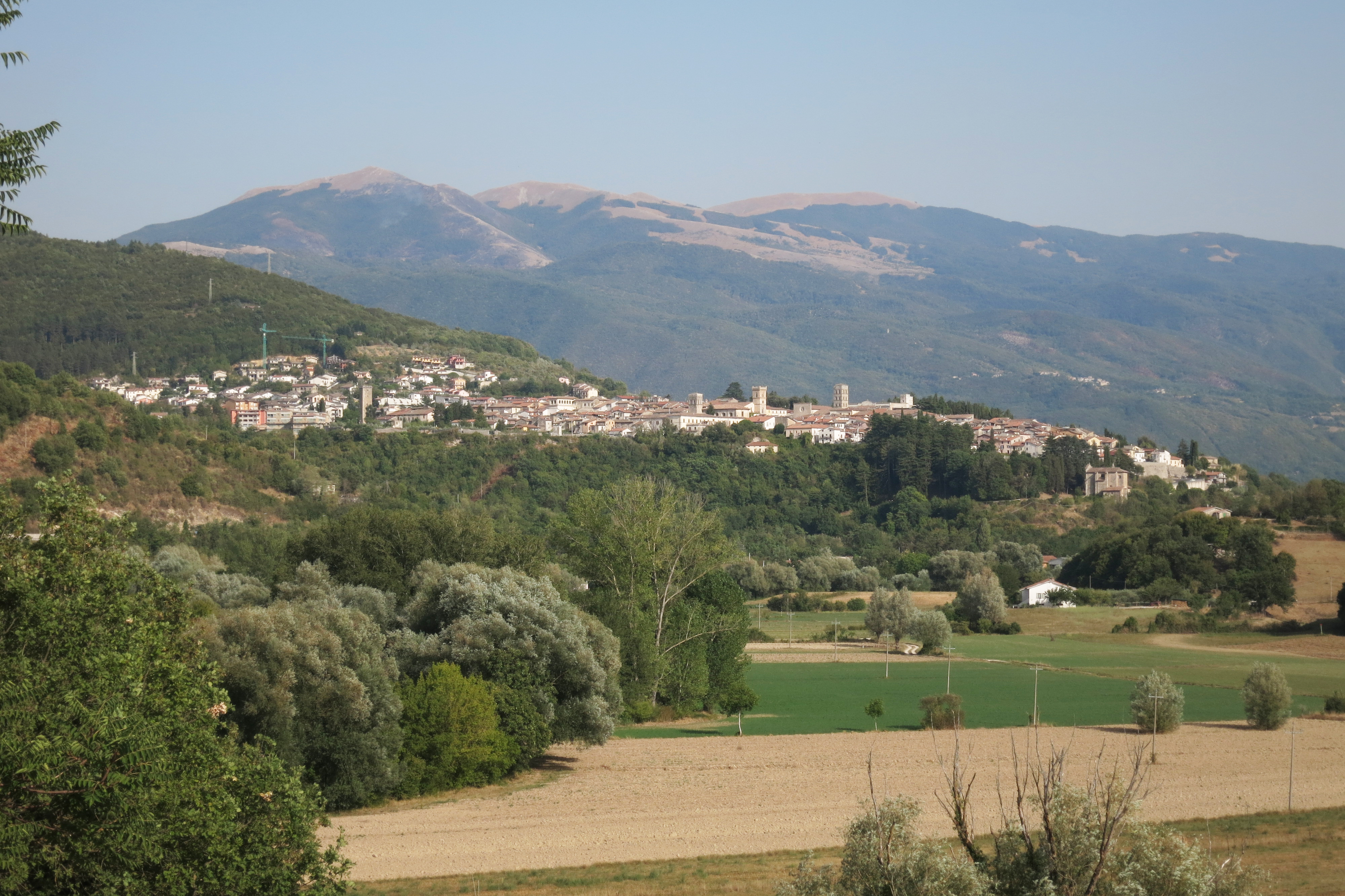
- View of Cittaducale

- Location within Italy Location within Lazio
- Coordinates: 42°23′N 12°57′E
- Country: Italy
- Region: Lazio
- Province: Province of Rieti (RI)
- Frazioni: Santa Rufina, Grotti, Calcariola, Pendenza, Cesoni, Micciani

Area
  - Total: 71.0 km^{2} (27.4 sq mi)
- Elevation: 481 m (1,578 ft)

Population (Dec. 2004)
  - Total: 6,799
  - Density: 95.8/km^{2} (248/sq mi)
- Demonym: Civitesi
- Time zone: UTC+1 (CET)
  - Summer (DST): UTC+2 (CEST)
- Postal code: 02015
- Dialing code: 0746
- Saint day: 19 agosto
- Website: Official website

Cittaducale (locally Cieta) is a comune (municipality) in the Province of Rieti in the Italian region Lazio, located about 70 kilometres (43 mi) northeast of Rome and about 7 kilometres (4 mi) southeast of Rieti. As of 31 December 2004, it had a population of 6,799 and an area of 71.0 square kilometres (27.4 mi^{2}). It was once part of the Abruzzi Region.

The municipality of Cittaducale contains the frazioni (subdivisions, mainly villages and hamlets) Santa Rufina, Grotti, Calcariola, Pendenza, Cesoni, and Micciani.

Cittaducale borders the following municipalities: Borgo Velino, Castel Sant'Angelo, Longone Sabino, Micigliano, Petrella Salto, Rieti.

== Bishopric ==
With territory taken from the diocese of Rieti, Pope Alexander VI made Cittaducale the seat of a new diocese on 24 January 1502, but in view of the objections raised by Cardinal Giovanni Colonna, who was administrator of the diocese of Rieti, Pope Julius II suppressed the new see on 8 November 1505. However, after the cardinal's death and at the request of the bishop of Rieti, the same pope restored the diocese on 16 October 1508.

The diocese continued as a residential see until the death of its bishop Pasquale Martini in 1798, after which it was entrusted to a vicar of the bishop of Rieti until Pope Pius VII united it on 27 June 1818 to the archdiocese of L'Aquila. Finally, in 1976 it became again part of the diocese of Rieti, as it had been originally.

No longer a residential bishopric, Cittaducale is today listed by the Catholic Church as a titular see.

== Demographic evolution ==
Historical population

Year	Pop.	±%
1861	4,396	—
1871	4,213	−4.2%
1881	4,212	−0.0%
1901	4,460	+5.9%
1911	4,616	+3.5%

Year	Pop.	±%
1921	4,643	+0.6%
1931	4,553	−1.9%
1936	4,620	+1.5%
1951	5,301	+14.7%
1961	4,887	−7.8%

Year	Pop.	±%
1971	4,817	−1.4%
1981	5,506	+14.3%
1991	6,434	+16.9%
2001	6,542	+1.7%

Source: Data from ISTAT

== Transport ==
Cittaducale has a station on the Terni–Sulmona railway, with trains to Terni, Rieti and L'Aquila.
