= Lake of Cutilia =

Lake in Rieti, Italy

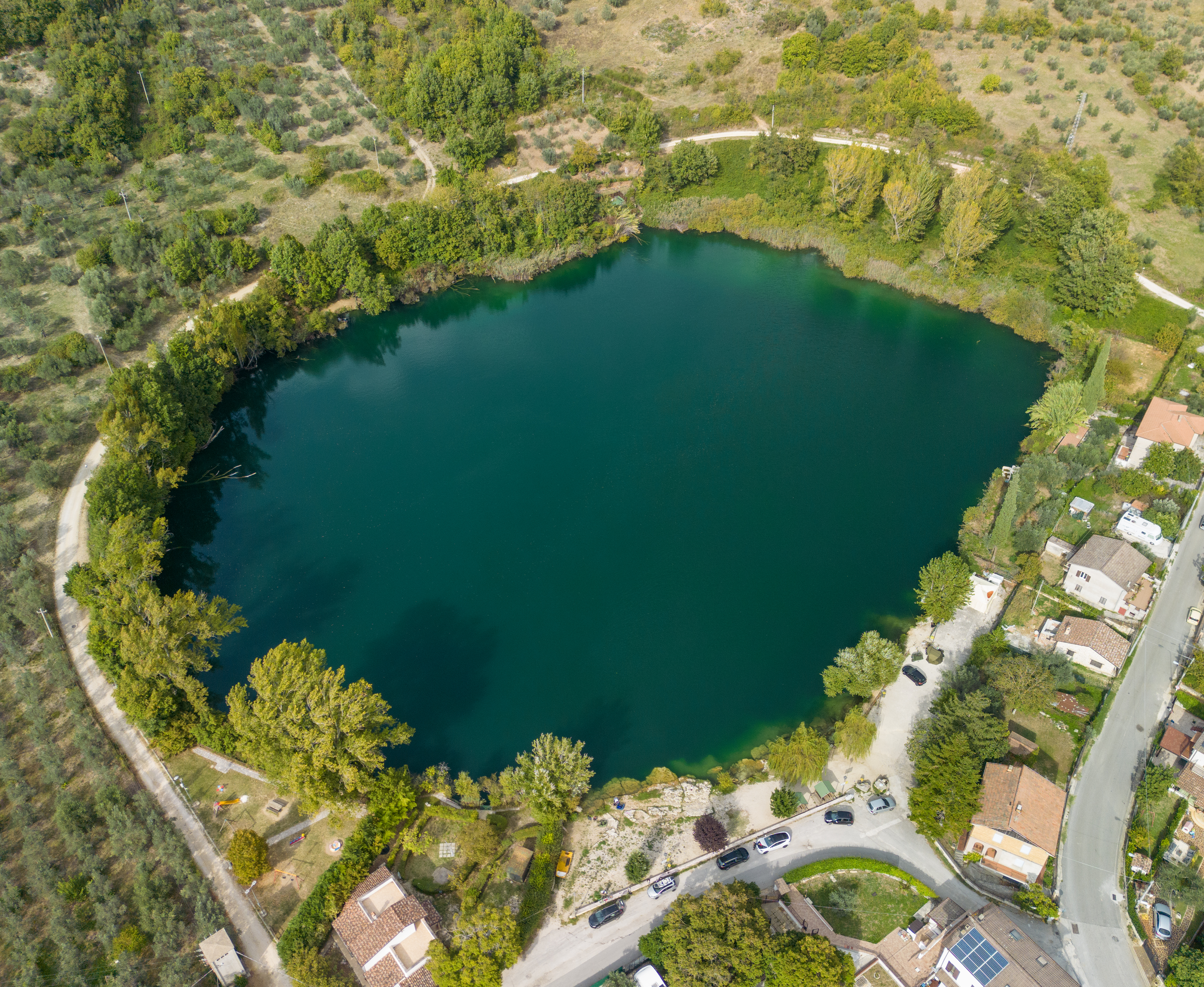

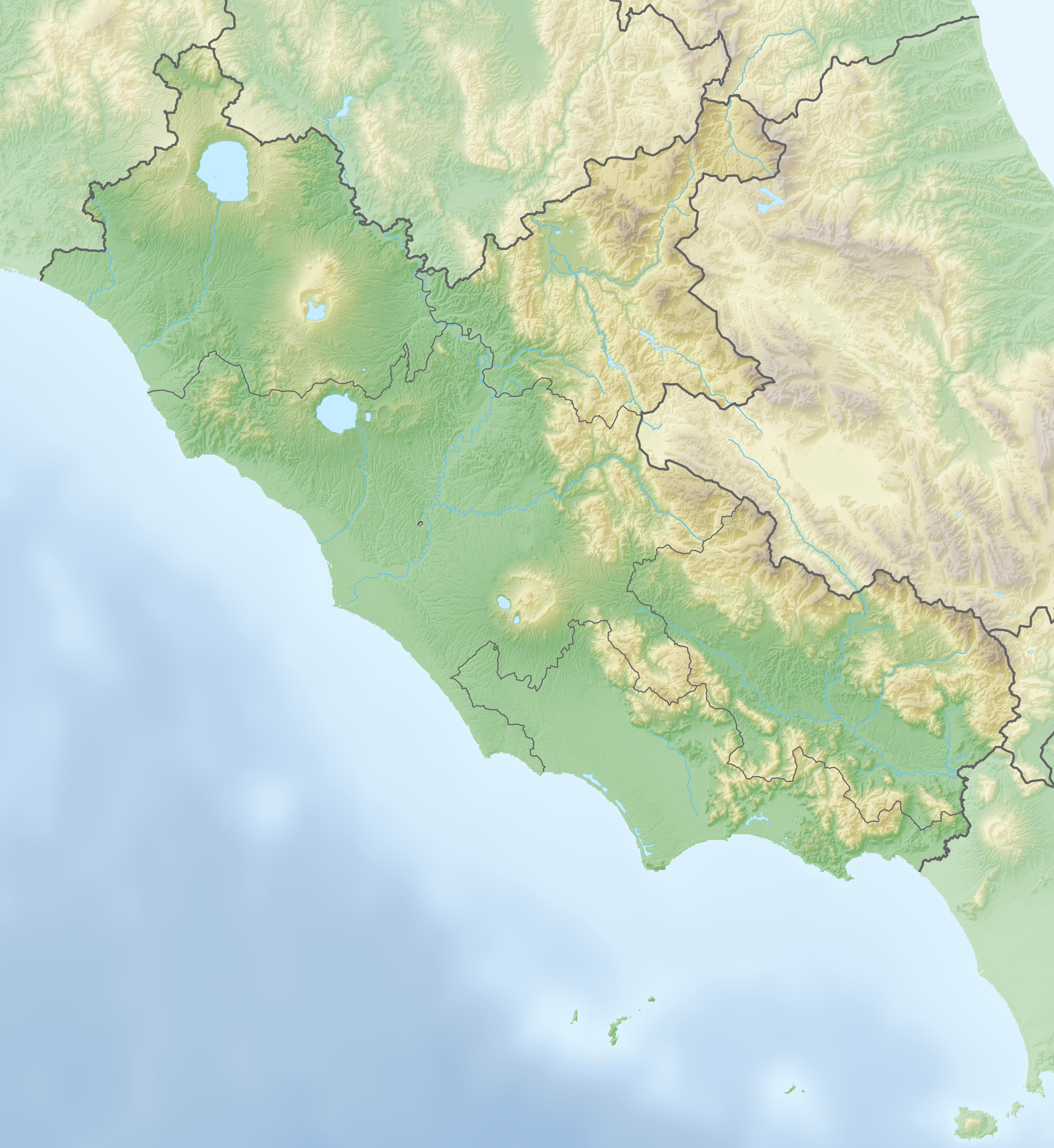
- Location within Lazio
- Location: Vasche, frazione of Castel Sant'Angelo (Province of Rieti, Lazio)
- Coordinates: 42.3823°N 13.0139°E
- Basin countries: Italy

Lacus Cutiliensis (Lake of Cutilia) is the ancient Roman name of the modern Lago di Paterno in the municipality of Castel Sant'Angelo, near the ancient Reate, now Rieti. In antiquity it was sacred to the Sabines. Varro, who came from Reate, called it the "navel of Italy".

== Overview ==
The lake took its name from the settlement of Cutiliae or Cutilium, which was on its shores at the foot of a mountain. In his work De Lingua Latina, Varro writes that the lake was inhabited by the lymphae commotiles or commotiae, nymphs whose presence is explained by the floating island found there. Pliny says much the same.

== History ==
In his book about theories on the origin of the Saturnalia, Macrobius narrates that the Pelasgians, one of the earliest people who inhabited Latium, had been expelled from their original territory and, having wandered through many places, at last arrived in great numbers at Dodona in Epirus. There they asked the local oracle where they could settle permanently. The oracle's responsum was that they should go to the Saturnian land of the Siculi and Aborigines, to Cutilia, where there was a floating island. They were to expel the locals, then sacrifice a tenth of whatever they had taken as booty (praeda) to Phoebus and to Hades. Human captives were explicitly included: they were instructed to "send the heads and phota ('lights', also 'lives') to the father".

Having followed the instructions of the oracle, they arrived at Lake of Cutilia and occupied the island. This island was formed by overgrown plants and its growth had been favoured by the murkiness of this marsh, as was said to have been of Delos.

After expelling the Siculi the Pelasgians occupied the lands. They offered as a sacrifice to Apollo the tenth part of the prey and built a shrine to Dis and an altar to Saturn, naming the feast Saturnalia after him. They continued for a long time to perform human sacrifices in order to offer heads to placate Dis and Saturn, until Hercules came to those lands and persuaded their descendants to replace the human heads with masks and to honour the altar of Saturn with lamps, since phota, "lights," may mean "lamps" as well as the "light" of men's lives.

The place was an enclosed area (locum saeptum: fenced place) considered sacred and was inhabited by an oracle influential among the Sabines. Sometimes the Sabine migrations known as the ver sacrum started from this place: a famous instance is that of the seven thousand sacrales led by Comus (or Cominus) Castronius who founded Bovianum following the steps of an ox, thus giving rise to the Samnite nation.

== The spring ==
The waters of a spring near the lake were extremely cold and supposed to be medicinal: they were considered good for the stomach and nerves, and were used in the Roman baths at Aquae Cutiliae, which can be seen today. The emperor Vespasian used to come every summer to drink the waters, and he died there, as did his son, the emperor Titus.
