= List of municipalities of the province of L'Aquila =

The following is a list of the 108 municipalities (comuni) of the Province of L'Aquila in the region of Abruzzo in Italy.

== List ==
Municipality	Population (2026)	Area (km²)	Density
Acciano	252	32.22	7.8
Aielli	1,370	37.52	36.5
Alfedena	917	39.96	22.9
Anversa degli Abruzzi	304	32.43	9.4
Ateleta	1,103	41.93	26.3
Avezzano	41,238	104.09	396.2
Balsorano	3,196	58.85	54.3
Barete	634	24.59	25.8
Barisciano	1,637	78.49	20.9
Barrea	677	87.11	7.8
Bisegna	212	46.59	4.6
Bugnara	998	25.12	39.7
Cagnano Amiterno	1,079	61.32	17.6
Calascio	119	39.44	3.0
Campo di Giove	742	28.90	25.7
Campotosto	428	51.73	8.3
Canistro	949	15.91	59.6
Cansano	216	37.70	5.7
Capestrano	811	43.66	18.6
Capistrello	4,596	60.97	75.4
Capitignano	602	30.64	19.6
Caporciano	201	18.62	10.8
Cappadocia	588	68.58	8.6
Carapelle Calvisio	68	14.79	4.6
Carsoli	4,952	95.80	51.7
Castel del Monte	379	58.03	6.5
Castel di Ieri	273	18.88	14.5
Castel di Sangro	6,590	84.44	78.0
Castellafiume	1,077	24.10	44.7
Castelvecchio Calvisio	125	15.32	8.2
Castelvecchio Subequo	803	19.29	41.6
Celano	10,121	82.80	122.2
Cerchio	1,542	20.17	76.5
Civita d'Antino	923	28.35	32.6
Civitella Alfedena	287	29.49	9.7
Civitella Roveto	3,018	45.45	66.4
Cocullo	203	31.61	6.4
Collarmele	752	23.94	31.4
Collelongo	1,055	54.02	19.5
Collepietro	200	15.21	13.1
Corfinio	947	17.95	52.8
Fagnano Alto	337	24.64	13.7
Fontecchio	280	16.86	16.6
Fossa	682	8.71	78.3
Gagliano Aterno	221	32.15	6.9
Gioia dei Marsi	1,688	58.40	28.9
Goriano Sicoli	523	20.24	25.8
Introdacqua	1,928	37.11	52.0
L'Aquila	70,803	473.91	149.4
Lecce nei Marsi	1,476	66.47	22.2
Luco dei Marsi	5,935	44.87	132.3
Lucoli	847	103.44	8.2
Magliano de' Marsi	3,400	70.93	47.9
Massa d'Albe	1,337	68.53	19.5
Molina Aterno	328	12.21	26.9
Montereale	2,183	104.42	20.9
Morino	1,280	51.28	25.0
Navelli	583	42.00	13.9
Ocre	1,095	23.60	46.4
Ofena	462	36.90	12.5
Opi	373	49.91	7.5
Oricola	1,274	18.36	69.4
Ortona dei Marsi	366	57.17	6.4
Ortucchio	1,736	39.00	44.5
Ovindoli	1,154	61.38	18.8
Pacentro	1,057	72.59	14.6
Pereto	630	41.16	15.3
Pescasseroli	1,993	91.17	21.9
Pescina	3,654	48.80	74.9
Pescocostanzo	1,081	55.06	19.6
Pettorano sul Gizio	1,259	62.85	20.0
Pizzoli	4,186	56.44	74.2
Poggio Picenze	1,028	11.46	89.7
Prata d'Ansidonia	424	19.65	21.6
Pratola Peligna	6,881	28.67	240.0
Prezza	804	21.60	37.2
Raiano	2,595	28.99	89.5
Rivisondoli	680	32.00	21.3
Rocca di Botte	891	31.11	28.6
Rocca di Cambio	523	27.62	18.9
Rocca di Mezzo	1,314	90.55	14.5
Rocca Pia	153	44.96	3.4
Roccacasale	562	17.31	32.5
Roccaraso	1,460	49.91	29.3
San Benedetto dei Marsi	3,715	16.76	221.7
San Benedetto in Perillis	100	19.10	5.2
San Demetrio ne' Vestini	2,002	16.49	121.4
San Pio delle Camere	663	17.21	38.5
San Vincenzo Valle Roveto	2,013	46.04	43.7
Sant'Eusanio Forconese	364	7.94	45.8
Sante Marie	1,053	40.82	25.8
Santo Stefano di Sessanio	102	33.70	3.0
Scanno	1,662	134.68	12.3
Scontrone	535	21.36	25.0
Scoppito	3,809	53.00	71.9
Scurcola Marsicana	2,700	30.38	88.9
Secinaro	302	33.34	9.1
Sulmona	21,610	57.93	373.0
Tagliacozzo	6,417	87.46	73.4
Tione degli Abruzzi	243	39.66	6.1
Tornimparte	2,729	65.96	41.4
Trasacco	5,804	51.44	112.8
Villa Sant'Angelo	511	5.22	97.9
Villa Santa Lucia degli Abruzzi	76	26.99	2.8
Villalago	490	33.20	14.8
Villavallelonga	822	73.74	11.1
Villetta Barrea	589	20.53	28.7
Vittorito	804	14.19	56.7

== See also ==
- List of municipalities of Abruzzo
- List of municipalities of Italy
