= Capistrello massacre =

Mass killing made by Nazis and Fascists in Italy

Coordinates: 41°58′13″N 13°23′55″E

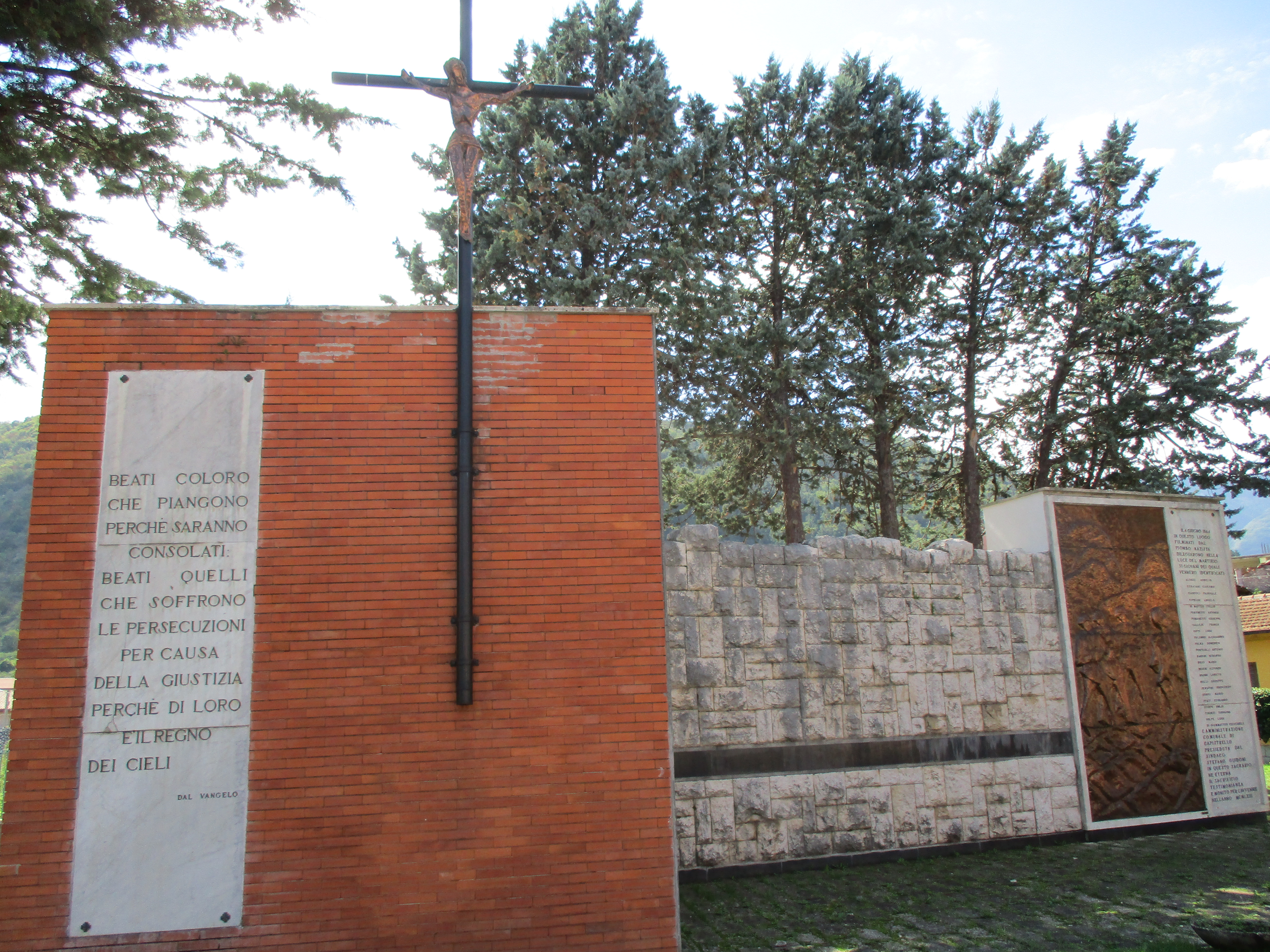
- Memorial of the 33 Martyrs of Capistrello
- Location: Capistrello, Italy
- Date: 4 June 1944
- Deaths: 33
- Victim: Italian civilians
- Assailants: Unnamed Nazi and Fascist soldiers
- Motive: Avenging the death of German soldiers, catching partisan suspects, catching allied soldiers hidden by the Capistrello inhabitants

The Capistrello massacre (Italian: eccidio di Capistrello) was a mass killing carried out in Capistrello, a small town in Abruzzo, Italy, on 4 June 1944 by Nazi and Fascist occupation troops during World War II. A first tragical episode occurred a few months earlier on 20 March, when a local youth was barbarically tortured and then shot. The following roundup made by Nazis and Fascists on the slopes of Mount Salviano led to the capture and torture of 33 shepherds and breeders. The shooting occurred near Capistrello railway station.

== Historical background ==
The massacre occurred during World War II on 4 June 1944, a few days after the breakthrough of the Gustav Line by the Allied forces which obliged Germans to retreat about 10 kilometres (6.2 mi) further north on that Hitler Line which proved to be vulnerable and was subsequently named Senger Line. This only allowed Wehrmacht to slow down the by now inevitable advance of Allied armed forces. In the days when German troops went up the State Route 82 of the Liri Valley, one of the main connection routes between Cassino, Marsica and Rome, they carried out a series of arrests and shootings of partisans as well as reprisals against the population of the towns that they were occupying or passing through.

== The massacre ==
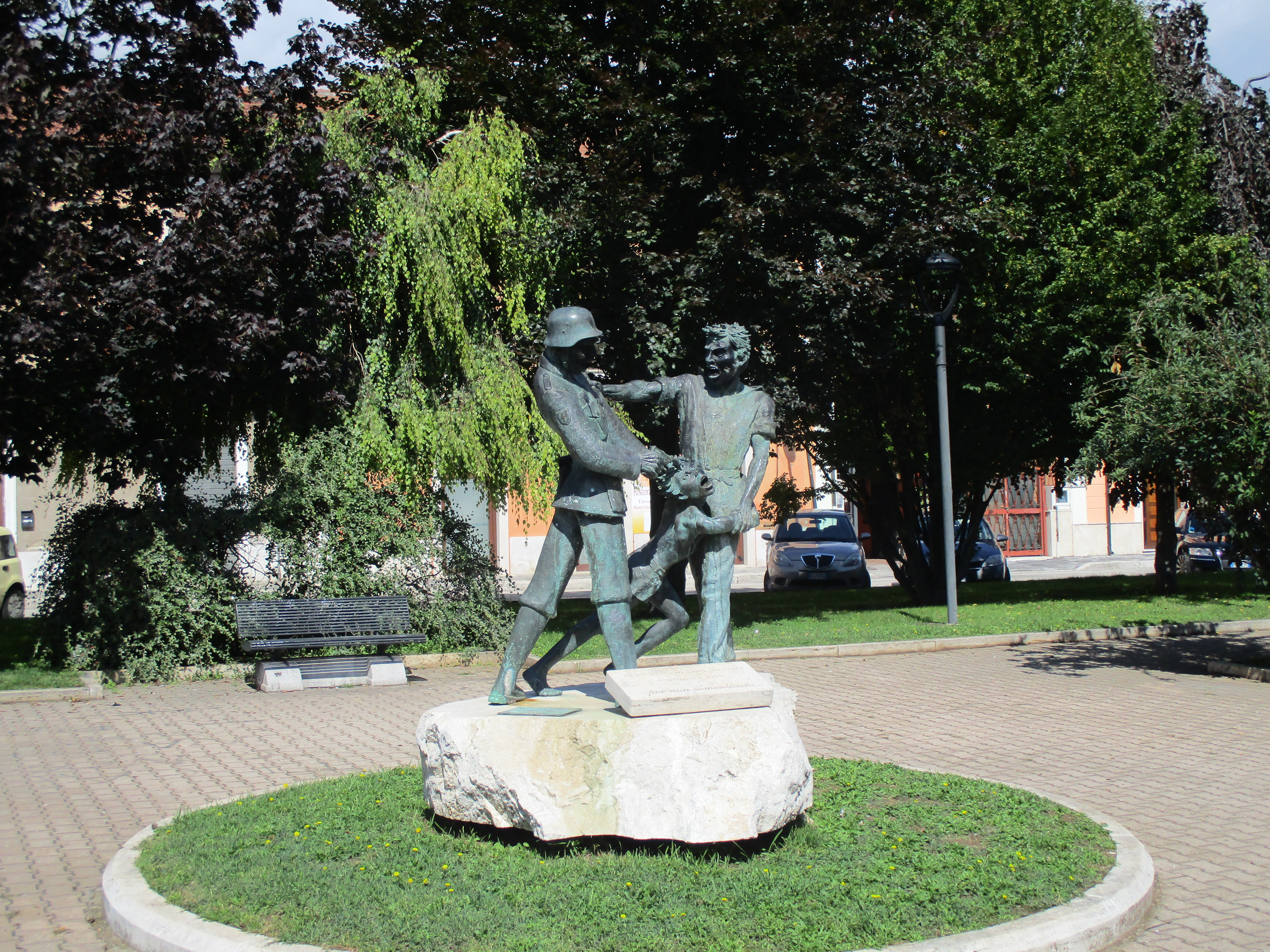
Martyrs of Capistrello memorial in Avezzano

The first criminal episode occurred in Capistrello on 20 March 1944 with the killing of Piero Masci, a local eighteen-year-old youth. The boy with his family had to accommodate German sergeant Joseph Breitner, but he was accused, together with Giovanni Barbati, another boy of the town, of having repeatedly stolen cigarettes and chocolate from the NCO's trunk. Once Masci and Barbati were accused by the sergeant, they were interrogated at the local German headquarters in the presence of lieutenant Nebgen Haing and Italian translator Enrico D'Armoneco from Bozen. Unlike his friend, Masci confessed, however both youths were sentenced to death and taken before the firing squad along a country road leading to the Pescocanale hamlet. Giovanni Barbati managed to flee by suddenly jumping in a precipice and escaping among the thick vegetation. Instead Piero Masci, before being shot, was slaughtered and tortured by Germans who went so far as to snatch his genitals off.

In the following weeks numerous acts of violence and other executions took place in the Abruzzese municipalities next to the road and railway communication lines guarded and used by Nazis for logistical purposes, especially in the Abruzzese towns of Aielli, Avezzano, Balsorano, Carsoli, Collarmele, Collelongo, Civitella Roveto, Gioia dei Marsi, Lecce nei Marsi, Onna, Opi, Pescina, Roccaraso, Tagliacozzo, Trasacco, and Villetta Barrea.

On 26 May the Allies, by now breaking through the Gustav Line, bombed some points of the Avezzano-Roccasecca railway line, also destroying the Capistrello station, while Germans stationed in the town, most probably before going up north, committed acts of unprecedented violence against the local population.

On 4 June, the day of the liberation of Rome by the Allies, five days before the English troops' arrival into town, Germans decided to make a last roundup on the mountains surrounding the town. On the western slope of the massif of Mount Salviano 33 shepherds and breeders from Capistrello and the nearby municipalities were stopped while seeking a shelter from possible further air bombings. The detained people were shut up in a goods warehouse of the bombed railway and brutally shot, so much so that the identification was possible only for 25 victims. The corpses, stripped naked and robbed of all their personal belongings, were thrown in a pit created by the Allied bombing of 26 May. The victims, among them three under-age boys, were called "martyrs".

On 25 May 2004 the President of the Italian Republic, Carlo Azeglio Ciampi, decorated the town of Capistrello with the Golden Medal for Civil Merit (Medaglia d'Oro al Merito Civile).

== Victims ==
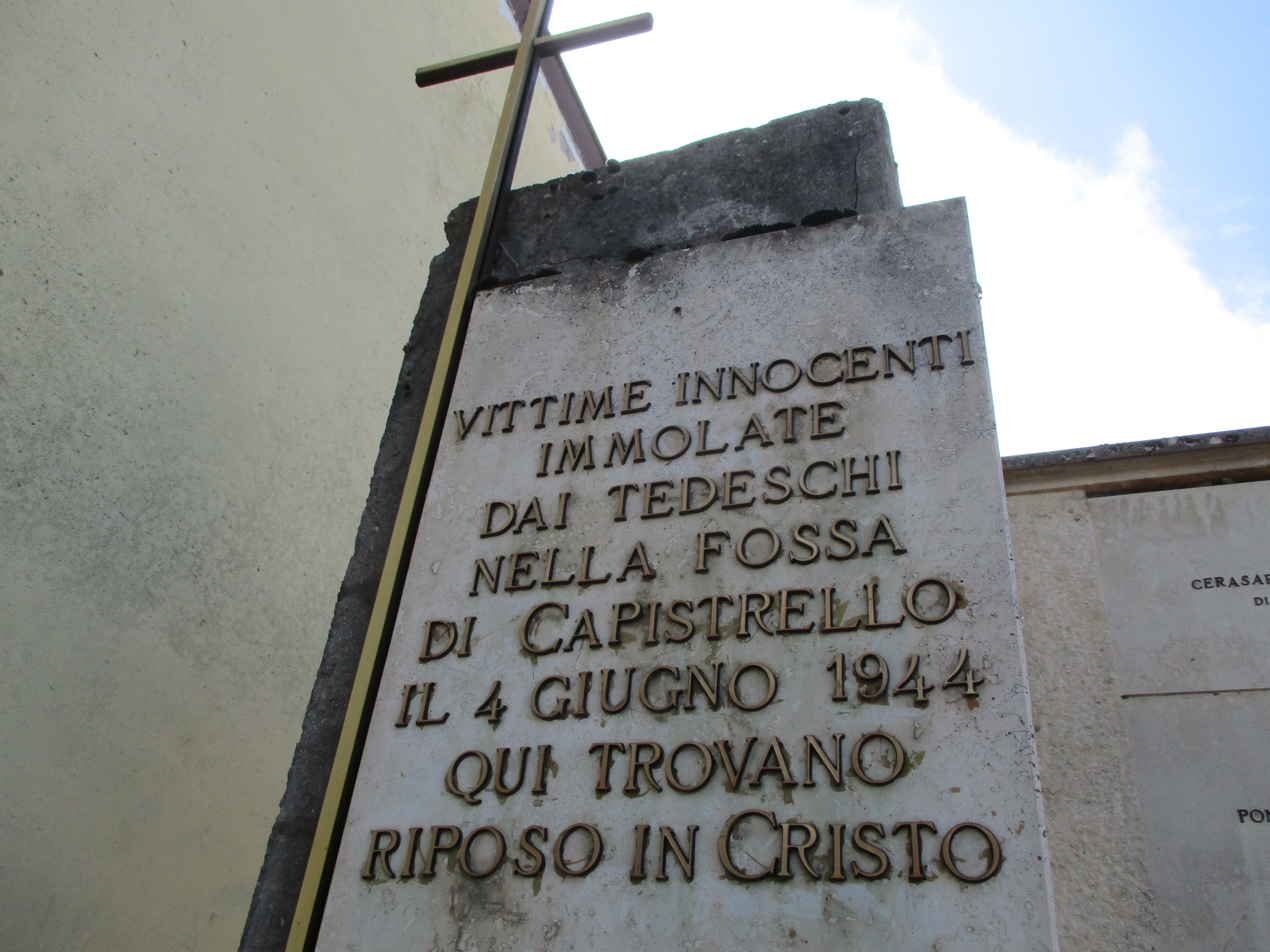
Memorial plaque in memory of the victims

20 March 1944:

- Piero Masci (18 years)

4 June 1944: only 26 victims on a total of 33 were identified:

- Aurelio Alonzi (20 years)
- Giacomo Cerasani (27)
- Angelo Cipriani (44)
- Ezechiele Di Giammatteo (38)
- Tullio Di Matteo (20)
- Antonio Forsinetti (39)
- Giuseppe Forsinetti (13)
- Franco Gallese (21)
- Pasquale Giangoli (40)
- Luigi Giffi (18)
- Alfredo Lustri (28)
- Alessandro Palumbo (16)
- Domenico Palma (55)
- Antonio Pontesilli (19)
- Bernardo Raniero (17)
- Mario Ricci (45)
- Alfonso Rosini (43)
- Loreto Rosini (40)
- Giuseppe Rulli (31)
- Innocenzo Serafini (53)
- Mario Sorgi (23)
- Fernando Stati (34)
- Emilio Stirpe (32)
- Giovanni Tiburzi (25)
- Luigi Volpe (31)

== Bibliography ==
- Romolo Liberale (1976). Ode ai 33 di Capistrello (in Italian). Notaresco: Amministrazione comunale. SBN IT\ICCU\VEA\0176451.
- Antonio Rosini (1994). Otto mesi di ferro e fuoco: Avezzano e dintorni, 1943-1944 (in Italian). Avezzano: Grafiche Di Censo. SBN IT\ICCU\CFI\0277533.
- Antonio Rosini (1998). Giustizia negata: martiri di Capistrello, martirio di Piero Masci (in Italian). Luco dei Marsi: Aleph. SBN IT\ICCU\AQ1\0039581.
