= Marsian language =

Extinct Italic language spoken in Italy

Marsian
- Native to: Marruvium
- Region: Marsica in Abruzzo
- Ethnicity: Marsi
- Era: 300-150 BC
- Language family: Indo-European: Italic; Osco-Umbrian; Umbrian; Marsian
- Writing system: Inscriptions in votive offerings

Language codes
- ISO 639-3: ims
- Glottolog: mars1253
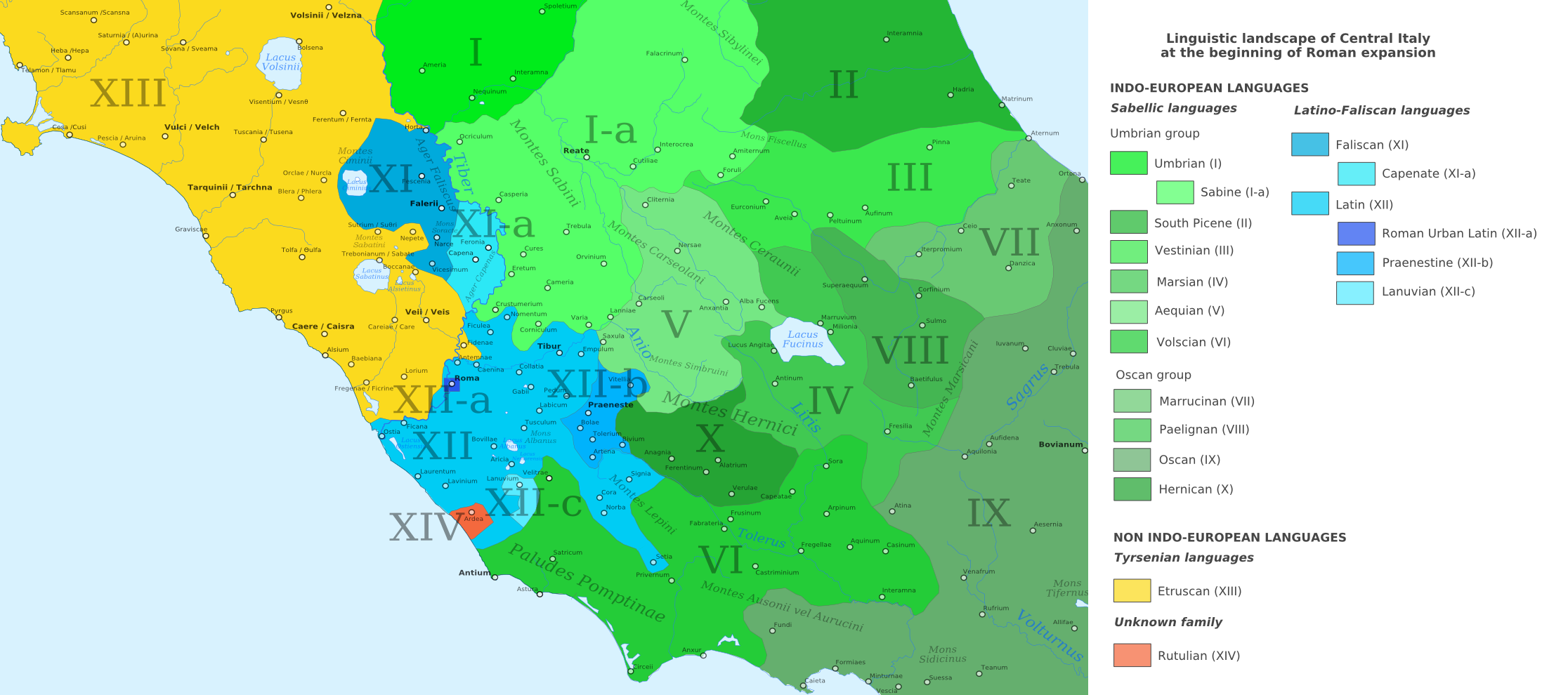
- Marsian

The Marsian language is the extinct language of the Marsi.

== Corpus ==
The Marsian inscriptions are dated by the style of the alphabet from about 300 to 150 BC (the middle Roman Republic). Conway lists nine inscriptions, one from Ortona and two each from Marruvium, Lecce, Trasacco and Luco. In addition, there are a few glosses, a few place names and a few dozen personal names in Latin form.

=== Bronze of Lake Fucinus ===
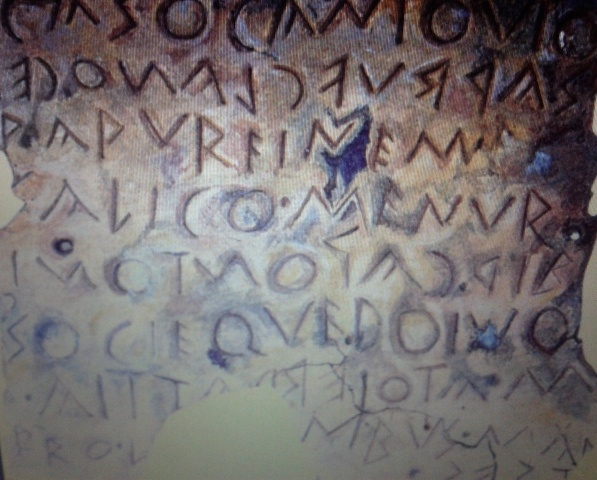
Reproduction of the inscription

The Bronze of Lake Fucinus was an inscribed bronze plaque found in 1877 near Luco during the draining of the lake, from an ancient settlement that had been covered by the lake. The bronze was placed in the Museum of Prince Alessandro Torlonia, where it was photographed for publication. It was lost in 1894 and it has not been seen since. The text of the plaque is as follows:

caso cantouio | s aprufclano cei | p apur finem e..| salicom
en ur | bid casontonio | socieque dono | m ato.er.a[n]ctia | pro
le[gio]nibus mar | tses.

It seems to be or describe a votive offering (donom) perhaps of boars (apruf) to the local goddess(es) Anctia (a[n]ctia) on behalf of the Marsian Legions (pro le[gio]nibus martses).

== Bibliography ==
- Conway, Robert Seymour (1897). The Italic Dialects Edited with a Grammar and Glossary. Cambridge: University Press. pp. 289–299.

Attribution

- Endnote:
  - Conway, R. S. The Italic Dialects. pp. 290 seq. (from which some portions of this article are taken; on the Fucino-Bronze, ib. p. 294)
