= Marsica =

Geographical and historical region in Abruzzo, central Italy

Coordinates: 42.0333°N 13.4167°E

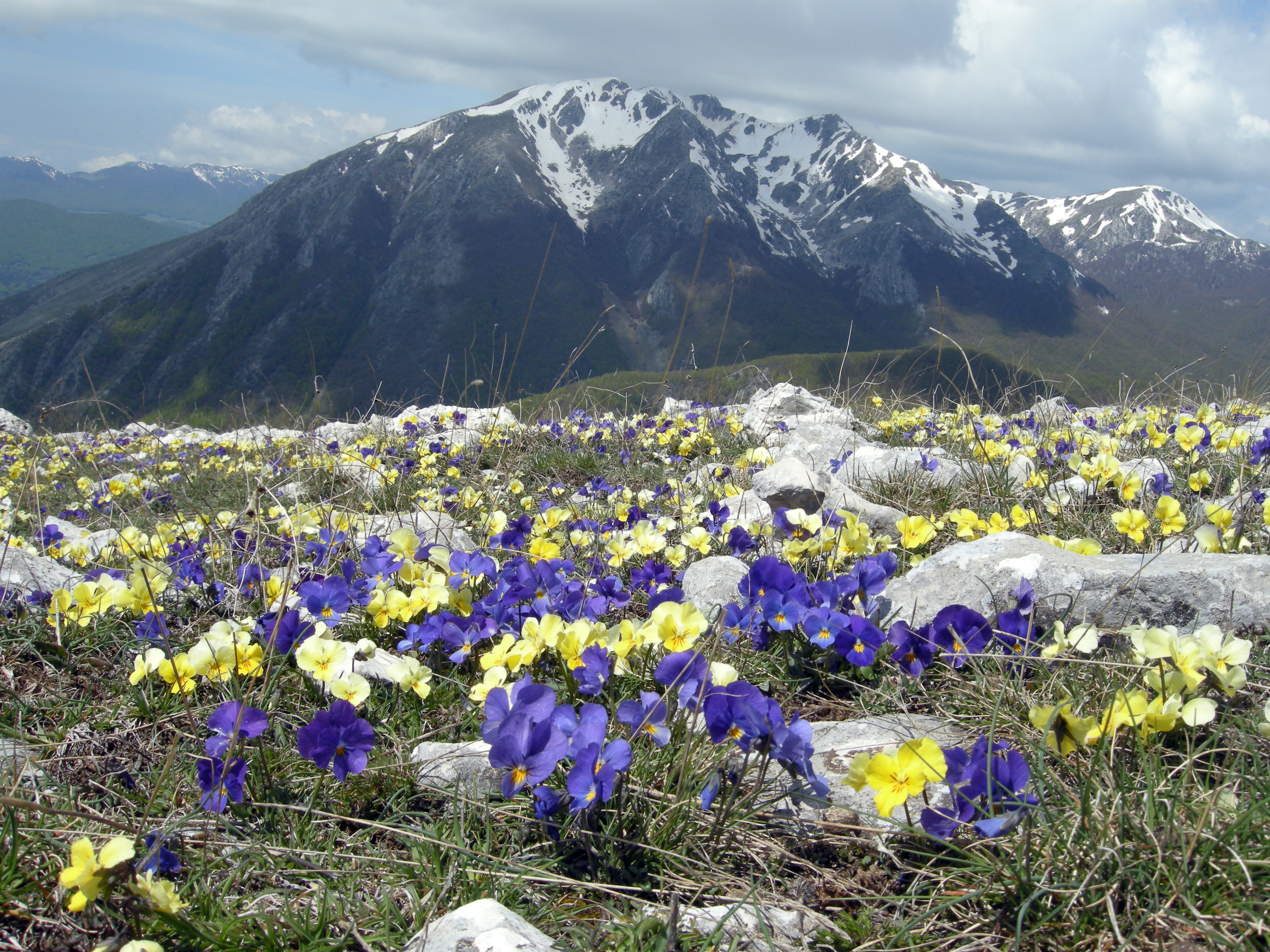
Monte Marsicano

Marsica is a geographical and historical region in Abruzzo, central Italy, including 37 comuni in the province of L'Aquila. It is located between the plain of the former Fucine Lake, the National Park of Abruzzo, Lazio and Molise, the plain of Carsoli and the valley of Sulmona.

The area takes its name from the Marsi, an Osco-Umbrian Italic people, and then from the Latin adjective marsicus. In the center of the area there is the Fucino former lake, dried up in 1877, surrounded by parks and nature reserves. Avezzano is the most populous city of the territory. Marsica has about 125,000 inhabitants as of 2025.

== Comuni ==
The Marsica includes 37 comuni: Aielli, Avezzano, Balsorano, Bisegna, Canistro, Capistrello, Cappadocia, Carsoli, Castellafiume, Celano, Cerchio, Civitella Roveto, Civita d'Antino, Collarmele, Collelongo, Gioia dei Marsi, Lecce nei Marsi, Luco dei Marsi, Magliano de' Marsi, Massa d'Albe, Morino, Opi, Oricola, Ortona dei Marsi, Ortucchio, Ovindoli, Pereto, Pescasseroli, Pescina, Rocca di Botte, San Benedetto dei Marsi, San Vincenzo Valle Roveto, Sante Marie, Scurcola Marsicana, Tagliacozzo, Trasacco, Villavallelonga.

== Geography ==
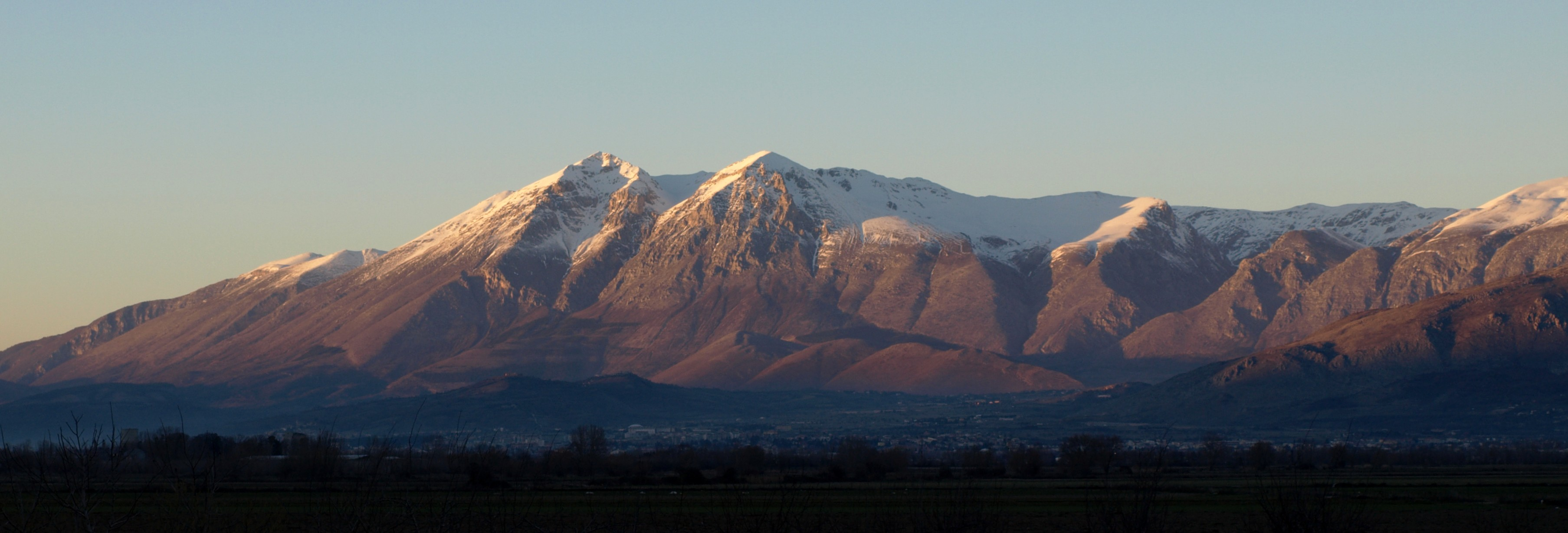
Mount Velino at sunset

The Marsican region extends for about 1906 km^{2} on a heterogeneous territory; the flat areas are the Fucino basin (140 km^{2}), the Palentini plains (60 km^{2}) and the more contained Cavaliere plain. Mount Velino is its highest peak (2487 m) while the lower area is located in the comune of Balsorano (293 m). The greatest differences in height are recorded in Magliano dei Marsi and in Celano; on the contrary the comune of San Benedetto dei Marsi, overlooking the lake, has an excursion of 50 meters. The highest municipalities are Ovindoli and Opi, respectively located at an altitude of 1 375 and 1 250 meters above sea level.

== History ==
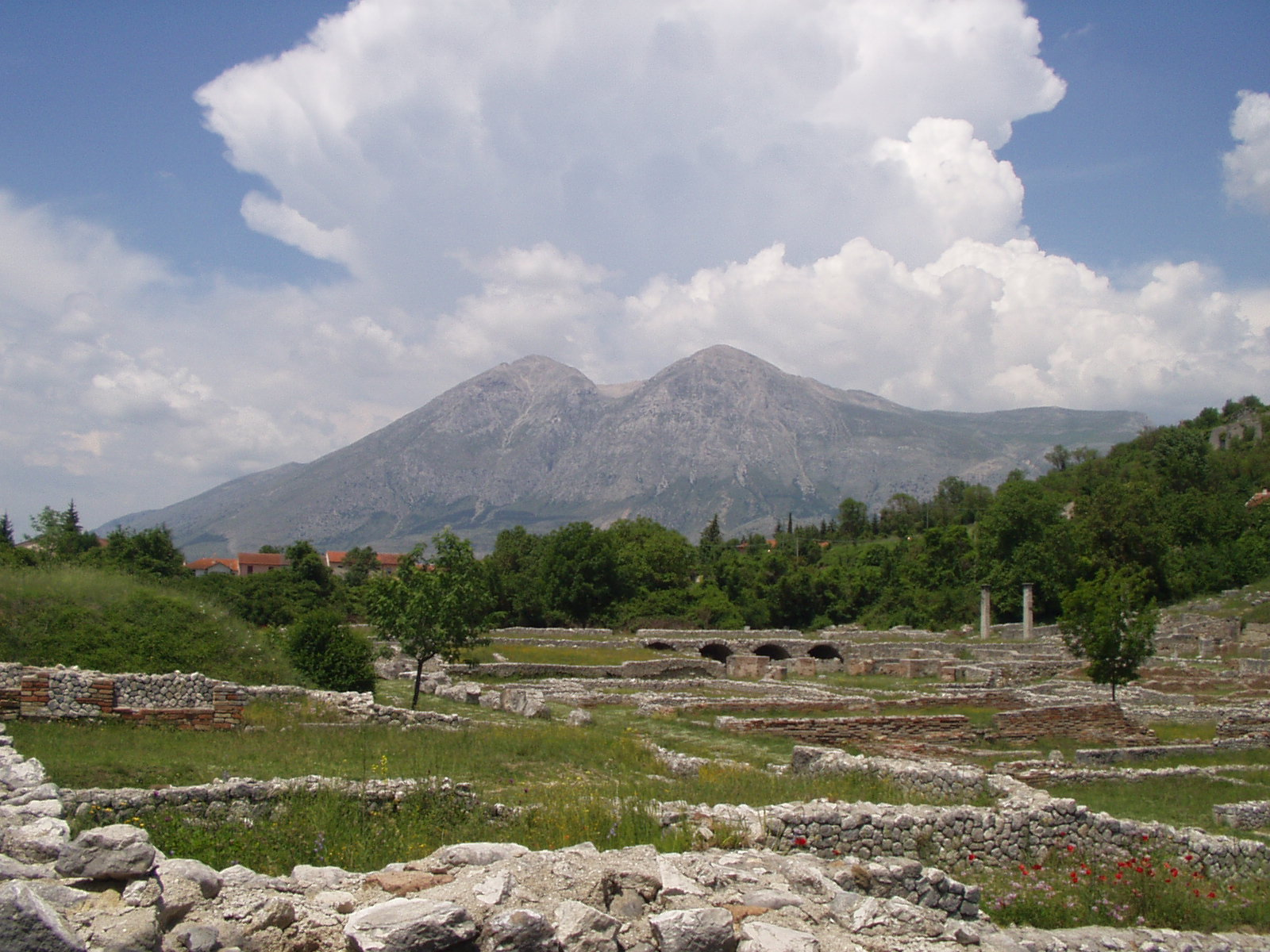
Alba Fucens

=== Ancient ===
The region takes its name from the ancient Osco-Umbrian population of the Marsi. The capital of the Marsi was originally Marruvium. Other important centers were Antinum, Lucus Angitiae and, in Aequi's territory, on the border with the Marsi, Alba Fucens and Carsioli. Alba Fucens, after the Roman conquest, became a Latin colony. The region was one of the main scenarios of the social war, which is also called bellum Marsicum. With the territorial reorganization of Italy operated with the birth of the Empire, the Marsi were included within the Samnium.

=== Middle age ===
After the fall of the Roman Empire, the territory was, like the rest of the Italian peninsula, part of the Ostrogothic kingdom and then conquered by the Byzantines. Following the Lombard invasion, it became part of the Longobard Duchy of Spoleto.

=== 1915 earthquake ===
Marsica was hit hard by the one-minute, 7.0 magnitude 1915 Avezzano earthquake, which obliterated most buildings in the valley and killed the vast majority of people in Avezzano and some other nearby villages. In spite of the demise of Avezzano in the quake, the population centres got built up and increased in population afterwards. The high number of casualties was caused by no building codes being in force with the weak houses capsizing as well as the very unusual length of the shaking and it happening in the early morning.

== Parks ==
The Marsica territory is rich in parks and natural reserves. Apart the Abruzzo National Park, it includes the natural reserve of Zompo lo Schioppo, the Regional Natural Park of Sirente-Velino, the Monte Velino Natural Reserve, and the Monte Salviano Natural Reserve. The most characteristic animal species is the Marsican brown bear, an endemism of Marsica.

== See also ==
- Marsi
- Avezzano
- Fucine Lake
- Parco Nazionale d'Abruzzo, Lazio e Molise
