= Placidus (martyr) =

3rd-century Roman priest

Saint Placidus
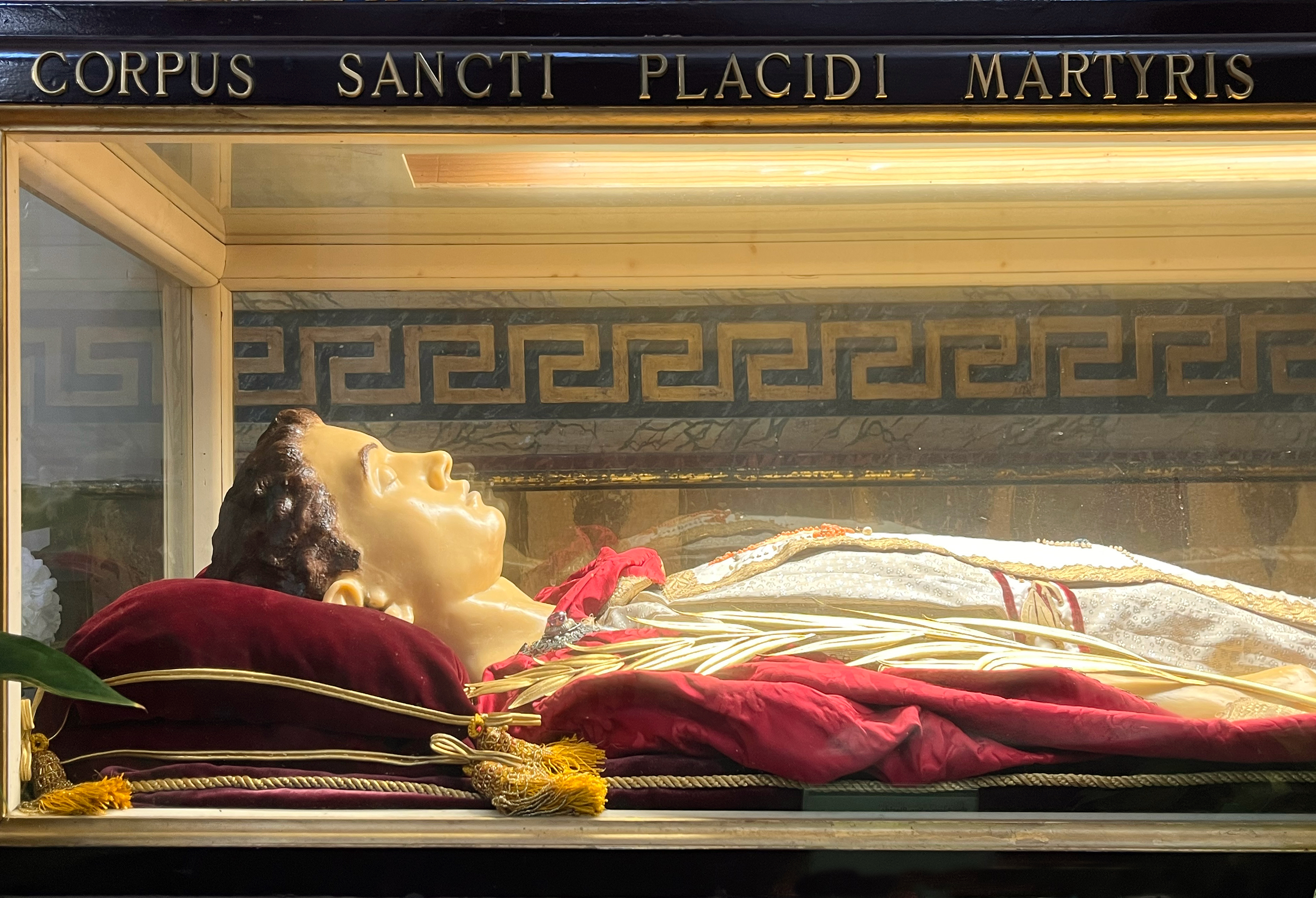
- Urn which has housed the remains of Saint Placidus since 1948

Martyr
- Born: 3rd century AD
- Died: August 31, 237; Trasacco
- Venerated in: Roman Catholic Church
- Feast: October 5
- Attributes: Palm branch
- Patronage: Priest and martyr, Montecarotto

Placidus (died Trasacco, August 31, 237) was a Roman priest, venerated as a saint by the Catholic Church.

== Hagiography ==
Of the life of Placidus, not to be confused with his namesake venerated in Messina, we know practically nothing, except that he was a Christian priest who lived in the 3rd century. There are, however, medieval legends drawn from an hagiographic account inserted into the Martyrologium Hieronymianum that identify him as one of the two favourite disciples of Benedict of Nursia along with Maurus. This account narrates of other saints commemorated on October 5 who, despite belonging to different places, were all allegedly killed in Messina in the 6th century, during a pirate raid, erroneously mistaken for Arabs by Peter the Deacon in his Vita Placidi. Therefore, to trace the causes of his martyrdom, we must refer to the sacrifice of the priest Cesidius, originally from Trasacco, and inserted into the Roman Martyrology in 1583. The editor of the entry was Cardinal Caesar Baronius, due to the interest of Father Camillo, whose wife Porzia Febonia and the historian's mother was from Trasacco.

The Roman Martyrology indicates the death of the priest Cesidius on August 31, along with other Christians near the basin of Lake Fucino, based on the narrative derived, probably, from a Latin passio of the Acts of Saint Christopher and according to which the three priests, Cesidius, Placidus, and Eutychius (but practically nothing is known of the latter), fell victim to the persecutions ordered by the Emperor Maximinus Thrax. The three religious men were killed during a mass in Trasacco, where the Bishop of Assisi Rufinus, who was also Cesidius' father, had founded a church entrusted to his own son, which was later destroyed in 936 due to an incursion by the Magyars and rebuilt under the name of the "Cesidio and Rufino Saints" church. An unspecified number of Christians perished with them. After the martyrdom, Placidus' remains were stolen and taken to Rome, where they remained until 1686.

It is presumed that Placidus was originally from the Marsi region and that he met Cesidius after the latter, at the end of a period of imprisonment suffered in Amasya, in Turkey, along with his father, took refuge in the West, in Trasacco. Only later did Rufinus settle in Assisi. According to this reconstruction, Cesidius was then condemned to death for having stolen his father's body, who was martyred in Assisi after a new imprisonment. Consequently, the killing of Placidus, Eutychius, and the faithful present at the mass mainly depended on the death sentence that had struck Cesidius.

== The translation of the saint's mortal remains ==
In 1686, the martyr's remains were taken from the Catacombs of Calepodius – a Roman presbyter killed five years before Placidus and condemned to death by the Emperor Alexander Severus – under authorization from Pope Innocent XI, and transferred to Montecarotto. This transfer occurred on the wave of the process of recovering the cult of saints, typical of the Counter-Reformation policy, which led to the almost complete spoliation of the Roman catacombs. It can be inferred that the noble family of Cybo-Malaspina had a particular interest in the parish of Montecarotto, especially since the Bishop of Jesi, Lorenzo Cybo, had died there in 1680. It fell to his brother, the extremely powerful Cardinal Alderano Cybo, then Secretary of State to Innocent XI and previously Bishop of Jesi from 1656 to 1671, after having been domestic prelate to Urban VIII, to handle the request to grant Montecarotto the remains of a Roman martyr. Also in 1686, Lorenzo Cybo's successor, Pier Matteo Petrucci, was elevated to the dignity of Cardinal; this too may have facilitated the authorization for this retrieval from the Pope. The choice fell on Placidus, whose relics arrived at their destination on October 5, the day of the veneration of the Messinian monk, leading to an easy confusion ever since.

On July 6, 1693, during the Pastoral Visit to the parish, Monsignor Orazio Perozzi, Apostolic Commissioner of the Holy Office sent from Rome to eradicate traces of Quietism (after having suspended Cardinal Petrucci from episcopal activity, following his forced abjuration), carried out a canonical recognition of the remains of Saint Placidus. Perozzi carefully examined both the casket containing the bones, verifying the authenticity and integrity of the seals affixed at the time of the extraction and authentication of the relics in Rome by the Prefect of the Apostolic Sacristy, and the relics themselves. At the conclusion of the recognition, Perozzi granted authorization to expose those relics for the veneration of the faithful.

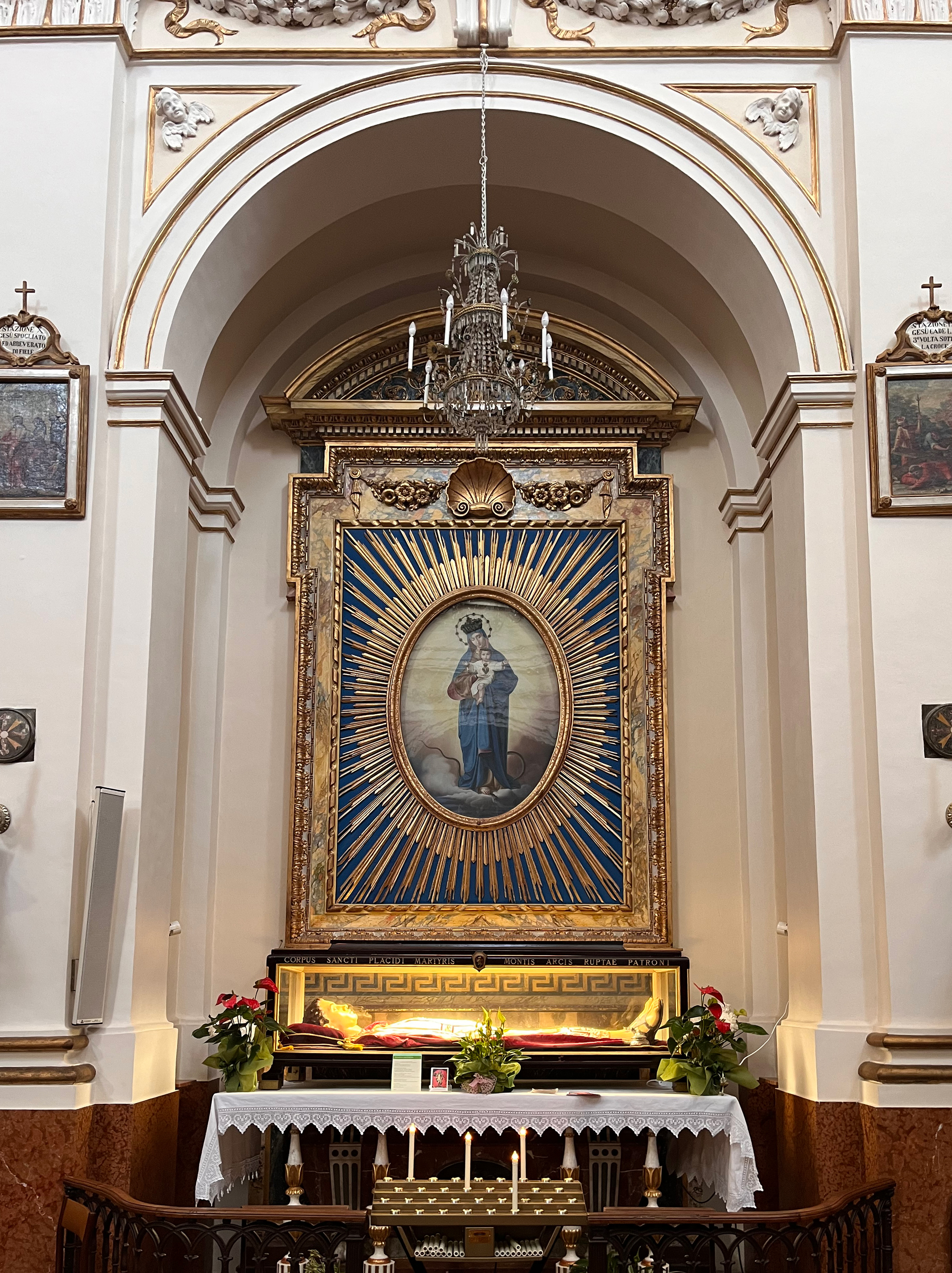
Chapel of the Immaculate Madonna, "SS. Annunziata" church, Montecarotto

== A legendary hagiography ==
After 1843 a legend grew around the saint's life in Montecarotto, which even claimed him to be the nephew and favourite disciple of Benedict of Nursia, sent by him to Sicily to found new monasteries, before falling victim to Saracen incursions (or rather, Arian Vandal pirates led by the feared Mamucha), who intended to eradicate the Christian cult. Proof of the absence of a historical link between the namesake killed in Messina and our young Roman is the fact that the remains of the former were found in Messina on August 4, 1588, five years after the first edition of the Roman Martyrology, and have been kept in Sicily ever since.

No less hazardous is the juxtaposition with another presumed Placidus, also a monk but of whom there are no hagiographical references, also killed in Messina in the 6th century, or even earlier, under Diocletian, hence the suspicion that the reconstruction of historical events is clumsy and that hagiographical investigations insist on a recurring difficulty in distinguishing two religious figures whose only connection is, probably, the name.

Baronius himself in the Roman Martyrology writes of a group of martyrs with a recurrence on October 11 composed of Saints Placidus (Deacon) and Anastasius (Presbyter), whose name was changed from the previous Tanasio and, even earlier, Taraco, to which are added Genesius and companions, never mentioned in the copies of the "Hieronymianum", but which together form an artificial group of martyrs always killed in Sicily, "due" - writes Caraffa - "to inept copyists".

It is undeniable that all these reconstructions, of scarce reliability, ignore the catacomb provenance of the martyr's remains, which attests to the pre-Constantinian era and supports the importance of recovering the body in a context of ferocious anti-Christian persecutions. And the followers of Peter and Paul were well aware that challenging the Roman authorities, and in particular stealing the relics of the martyrs (a crime punishable by death), would offer considerable advantages in terms of proselytism.

=== Martyrdom of Placidus and Eutychius ===
More noteworthy, however, is the martyrdom of Placidus and Eutychius, which the "Hieronymianum" places generically in "Sicily", commemorating it on October 5, although this date (which for Montecarotto remains the anniversary of the arrival of the relics from Rome) is surrounded by more imprecisions than certainties. The two were killed along with a variable number of companions: thirty in the manuscripts known as Bernense and Wissenburgense, eight in the Epternacense. However, the identities and the era in which these martyrs perished are impossible to establish with certainty, as ancient and reliable news is lacking. All this makes it particularly difficult to establish a relationship between the martyr and the remains preserved in Montecarotto, although it is presumed that the death dates back to the period of anti-Christian persecutions. Also in this case, the usual medieval legends are not lacking, which identify Placidus with the famous disciple of Saint Benedict, culminating in a tragic, but historically imprecise, martyrdom at the hands of Arab pirates. Consequently, both the Sicilian origins and October 5th falter.

== Cult ==
In 1843, Gregory XVI formalized Saint Placidus as the patron of Montecarotto. If, on one hand, the decision aroused a sense of pride for its religious significance, on the other hand, it gave rise to a heated debate on the presumed Benedictine identities — never documented before 1843 — already supported by Gregory XVI's choice to set the date of the martyr's veneration on the day dedicated to the Messinian monk. From this also derived the attribution of miraculous qualities, promptly denied by the Roman Curia. Since then, many images represent him in Benedictine attire, in stark contrast with the traditional Roman attire covering his relics. The prayer dedicated to him also denounces a "torment" traceable back to the tortures suffered by the Messinian namesake, proving a failure to split the two martyrological stories and a scarce reflection on the catacomb remains of the young Roman martyr.

=== Prayer to the Saint ===
O glorious Martyr Placidus,
your body speaks to us of torment, of patience, of victory and of glory.
The executioners tore at your youthful limbs and you smiled at them.
Your eye looked at Heaven while your blood flowed on earth.
The love you bore for Christ overcame the ardour of the torment and while they cursed and reviled you, you felt that no suffering can overcome the immense joy of Paradise.
You remained faithful to Jesus Lord in your virgin heart and you achieved the palm of martyrdom.
Our Advocate and Patron we greet you.
Be the guardian of our children and our young people; the sweet consoler of our sick and our old people; direct the rich and the worker on the royal road of charity.
Protect our families,
Pray, O pious one, for Montecarotto, for Italy, for the Church.
Obtain for us, O young saint, to be one day with You up there where the Father the Son and the Holy Spirit reign and the joy and the victory are common and eternal.
Amen.

=== Prayer to Saint Placidus (new version) ===
O Saint Placidus,
patron of our community of Montecarotto,
we turn to you with confidence.
Sustain our prayer: with us, and for us
pray to the Lord Jesus.
We admire in you the fidelity, lived out to martyrdom.
Called to say a generous Yes to the Lord, you did not hesitate.
And you knew how to give your generous answer at a young age.
You were not afraid to choose the Lord,
on Him you placed your bet
and you believed that a beautiful life
is only one lived close to the Lord.
We entrust our community to you, with all its needs.
Pray that our faith may be intense;
Pray that families may be united in love;
Pray that the elderly and the sick may find comfort;
Pray that everyone may live with dignity.
But in a particular way, to you who are young,
we want to entrust our young people.
Like you, may they be faithful to the love of the Lord.
Pray that they lead a generous, faithful, pure life.
Do not allow them to fall into a dull, tired existence, without ideals, without joy.
Do not let our young people live in fear:
the fear of loving, the fear of dreaming, the fear of searching.
Do not allow fear to block their hearts
when they are called to walk generously after the Lord Jesus.
And help us all to repeat, like Mary in the Annunciation:
Here we are, Lord, our life belongs to you;
do with us what you will, according to your plan of love,
for your glory,
for the salvation of all men.
Amen

== The new urn ==
On October 5, 1948, the saint's bones were recomposed and dressed, giving them the appearance of a young man in Roman civil attire. The wax statue displays the palm branch along the right arm, a metaphor for victory, ascent, rebirth, and immortality. Although a symbolic gesture, the choice of civil clothing (in the pre-Constantinian era, priests did not wear specific vestments) seems to support the theory of separation between the Roman martyr and the Messinian monk. His relics are currently preserved in the Church of the "Santissima Annunziata" in Montecarotto, inside a glass urn displayed in a side chapel of the nave dedicated to the Immaculate Madonna.

=== A statue with dubious attribution ===
The parish church preserves a gilded wooden statue from 1695, with the inscription "S: Placidus Martyr." at the base. The latter holds a symbolic model of the town in his right hand, as a sign of protection, although, based on external characteristics, the saint seems to portray Florian of Lorch, formerly patron of the Respublica Æsina and today co-patron of Jesi. Indeed, he wears a Roman soldier's uniform and holds a red banner in his left hand, two aspects consistent with the iconography of Saint Florian.
