= Fucino Space Centre =

Coordinates: 41.9790°N 13.6007°E

Telespazio Spa
- Company type: Privately held company joint venture (Società per Azioni)
- Industry: Aerospace
- Founded: 1965 (regular use)
- Headquarters: Ortucchio, Italy
- Services: Satellite services
- Owner: Leonardo (67%); Thales Group (33%)
- Number of employees: Approx. 250
- Website: www.telespazio.com/en/italy

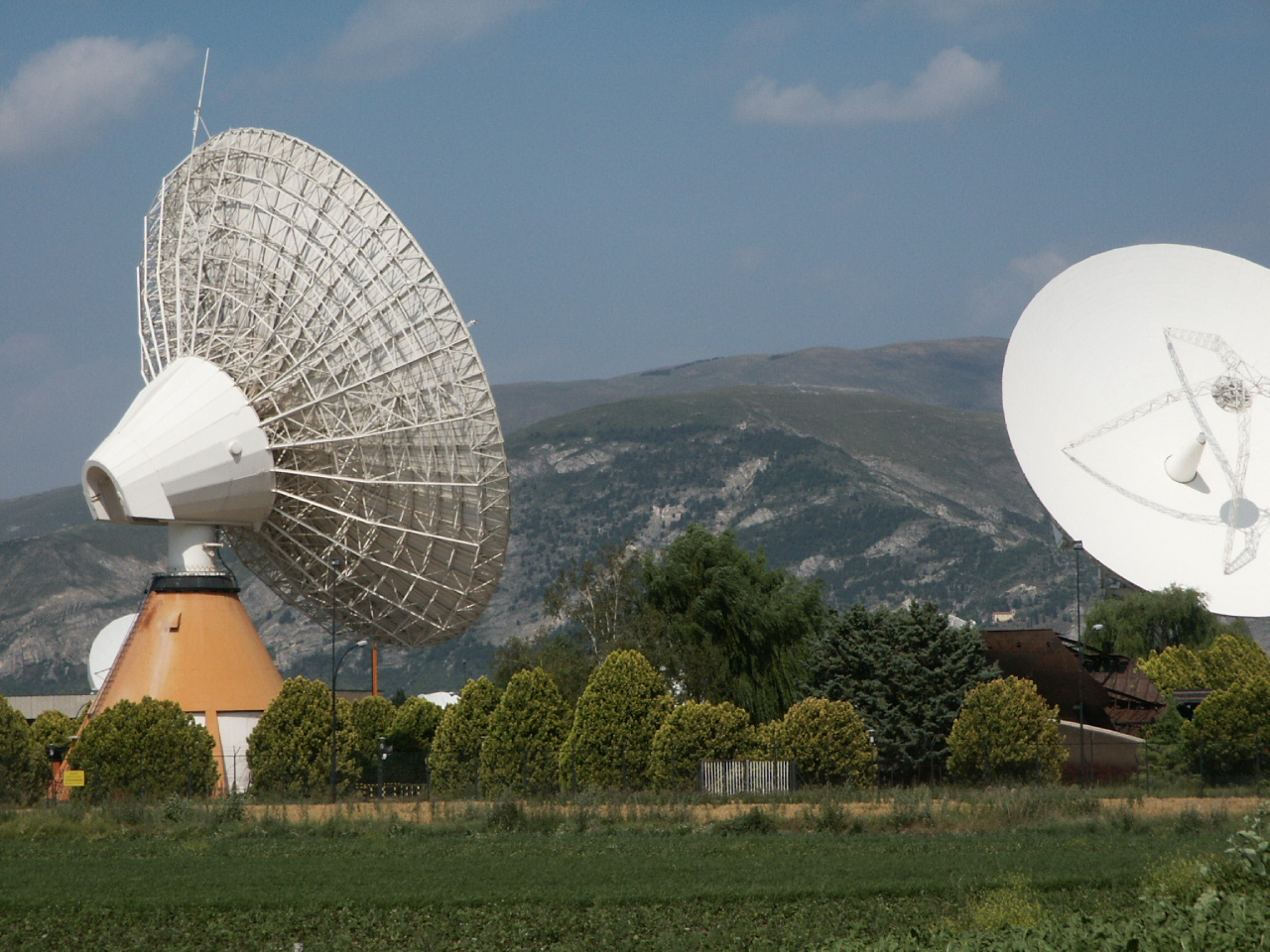
Telescopic parabolic antennas in Fucino

The Fucino Space Centre is the largest teleport in the world for civilian uses used for the control of artificial satellites, for telecommunications and for hosting, television and network services multimedia. Located in the Fucino plain in Abruzzo within the municipal area of Ortucchio, near Avezzano (AQ), central-east Italy, it is named after the engineer Piero Fanti, first director of Telespazio, and managed by the same company consisting of two joint ventures, the Italian Leonardo (Finmeccanica) for 67% and the French Thales for the remaining 33%.

== History ==
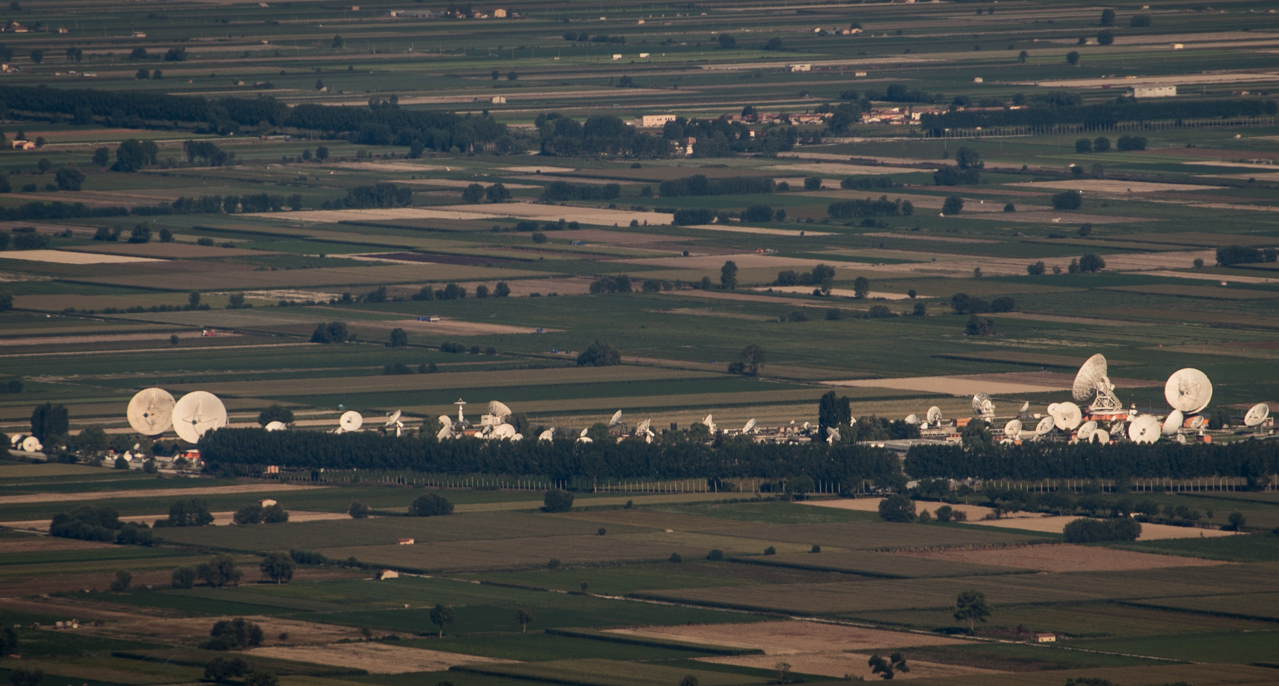
View of Fucino Space Centre from Sperone

The beginning of the history of Telespazio S.p.A. coincides with the signing of the memorandum of understanding between the company and NASA which took place in January 1962 and made it possible to participate and develop projects relating to the Telstar 1 and Relay satellites. With the granting of the exclusive license by the Ministry of Posts and Telecommunications, the construction of the first plants used for the experimentation of satellite telecommunications between Europe and the United States was started, in a favorable territory from an orographic and electromagnetic point of view.

The experimentation began at the end of 1962 through some small antennas of the radio link installed on three mobile vans parked in the Fucino plain in the locality of Cintarella, in the municipality of Ortucchio. Following the positive outcome of the experimental phase, the first antenna was established in 1964 which became the symbol of modern industry at a time when the historic sugar refinery in Avezzano was progressively dismantled, which represented the first industrial-type initiative launched in territory of Marsica.

In 1965 the Fucino space station was opened to satellite communications with the modification of the first small experimental antenna which was adapted for primary telemetry and remote control services. On 6 April 1965, the first commercial telecommunications satellite was launched with which the commercial telephone and television service between the Andover station in the United States and the newly formed Fucino station, still equipped with a small parabolic antenna, began on 28 June, 1965 9.14 meters in diameter, which could only operate on weekends also due to the limitation of the first commercial satellite sent into orbit, the Intelsat I.

In 1966 the first large 27-meter satellite dish was erected in the Fucino and entered service in August 1967, a few days before the official inauguration of the space center on 28 September, which was also attended by the head of the Government Aldo Moro. This operation was followed by numerous other collaborations in the field of satellite telecommunications and television services with international space agencies and started thanks to the national and international network of space centers and teleports.

In March 1985 Pope John Paul II on a visit to Telespazio sent a message of peace from Fucino to all the workers of the world before continuing his Abruzzese visit to the city of Avezzano.

Among the most important projects that came into operation in the Fucino space station are the command and control of a segment of the COSMO-SkyMed satellite system, the Argo project, reserved for emergency communications with fixed and mobile stations available to the Department of the Civil Protection to prevent serious accidents or natural disasters and to deal with emergencies and the Galileo Positioning System, a structure for navigation, control, satellite positioning and management of about 40 earth stations.

== See also ==
- Telespazio
- COSMO-SkyMed
- Galileo

== Bibliography ==
- Gigli, Ercole (2005). Ortucchio, dal lago al Telespazio (in Italian). Avezzano: LCL stampe litografiche.
- Palmieri, Eliseo (2006). Avezzano, un secolo di immagini (in Italian). Pescara: Paolo de Siena editore.
