= Ortucchio =

- Comune
- Comune di Ortucchio
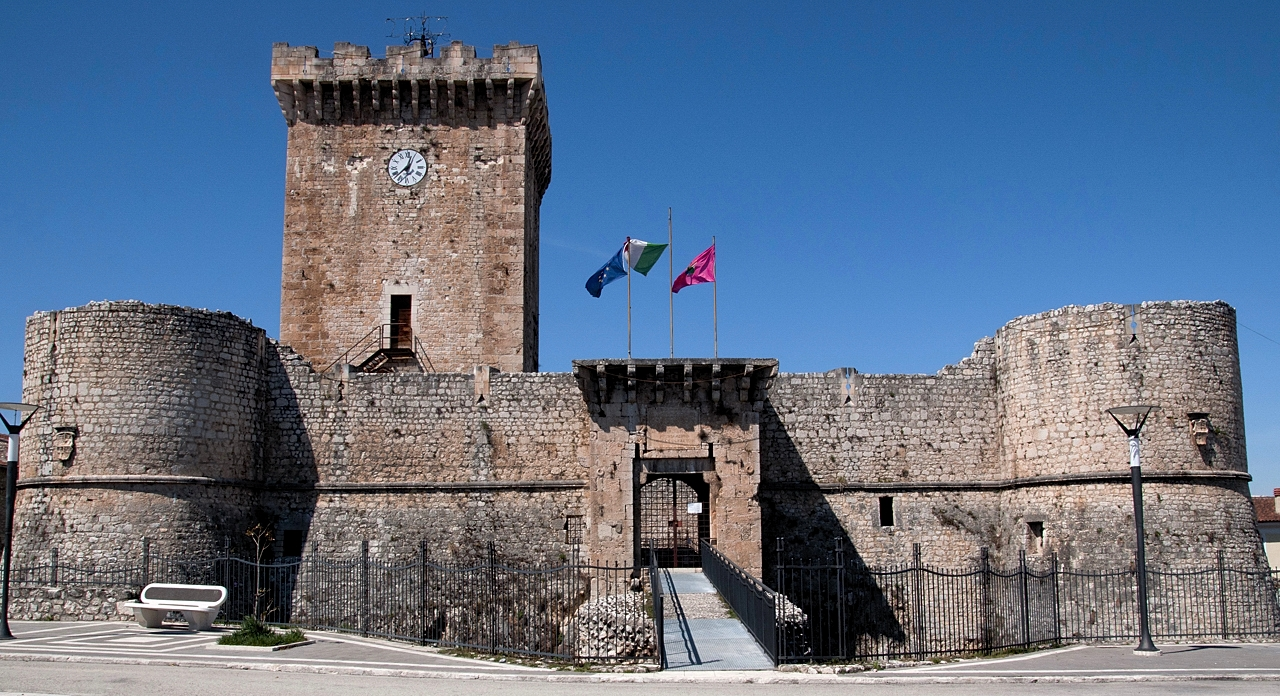
- Piccolomini castle

- Location within Italy Location within Abruzzo
- Coordinates: 41°57′22″N 13°38′48″E
- Country: Italy
- Region: Abruzzo
- Province: L'Aquila (AQ)
- Frazioni: Collelongo, Gioia dei Marsi, Lecce nei Marsi, Pescina, Trasacco

Government
  - Mayor: Raffaele Favoriti

Area
  - Total: 35.62 km^{2} (13.75 sq mi)
- Elevation: 680 m (2,230 ft)

Population (31 July 2015)
  - Total: 1,875
  - Density: 52.64/km^{2} (136.3/sq mi)
- Demonym: Ortucchiesi
- Time zone: UTC+1 (CET)
  - Summer (DST): UTC+2 (CEST)
- Postal code: 67050
- Dialing code: 0863
- ISTAT code: 066064
- Patron saint: Sant'Orante
- Saint day: 28 September
- Website: Official website

Ortucchio is a comune and town in the province of L'Aquila in the Abruzzo region of central Italy.

== See also ==
- Castello Piccolomini (Ortucchio)
- Fucino Space Centre
