= Castello Piccolomini (Ortucchio) =

Italian Middle-Age Castle

Coordinates: 41.9552°N 13.6437°E

Piccolomini Castle
- Castello Piccolomini
- Ortucchio
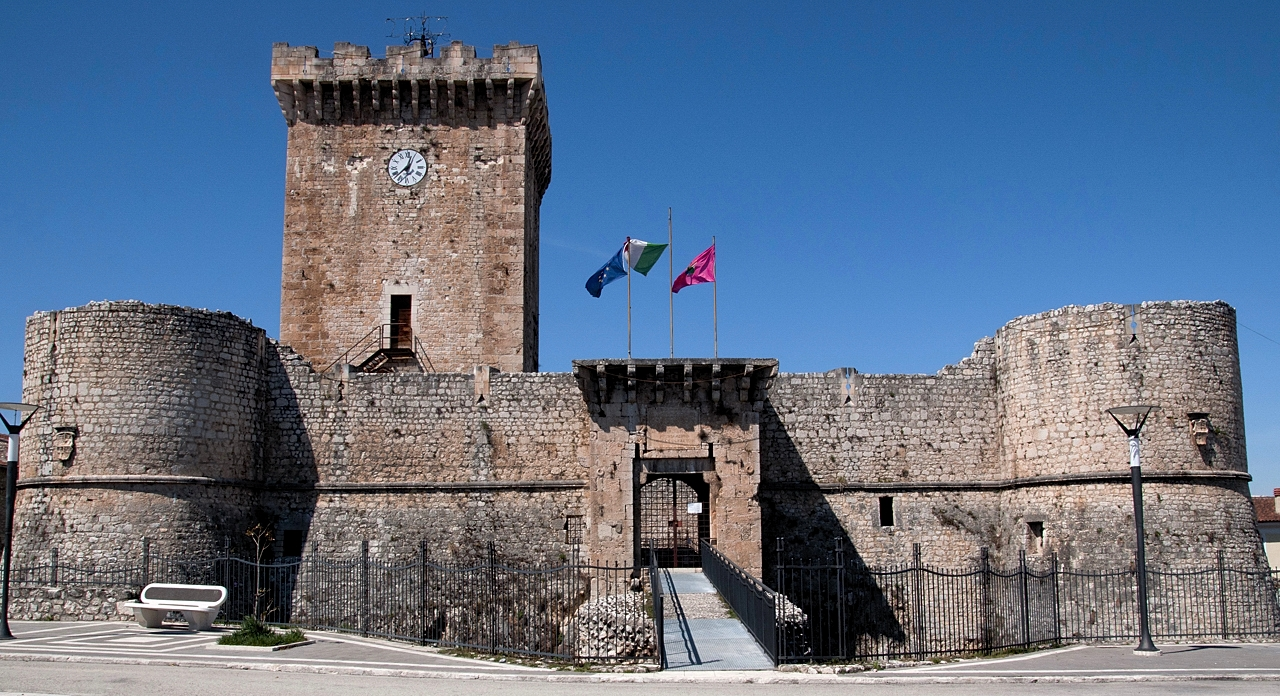
- Castle in Ortucchio

Site information
- Type: Castle

Location

Site history
- Built: 1488

Castello Piccolomini (Italian for Piccolomini Castle) is a Middle Ages castle in Ortucchio, Province of L'Aquila (Abruzzo).

== History ==
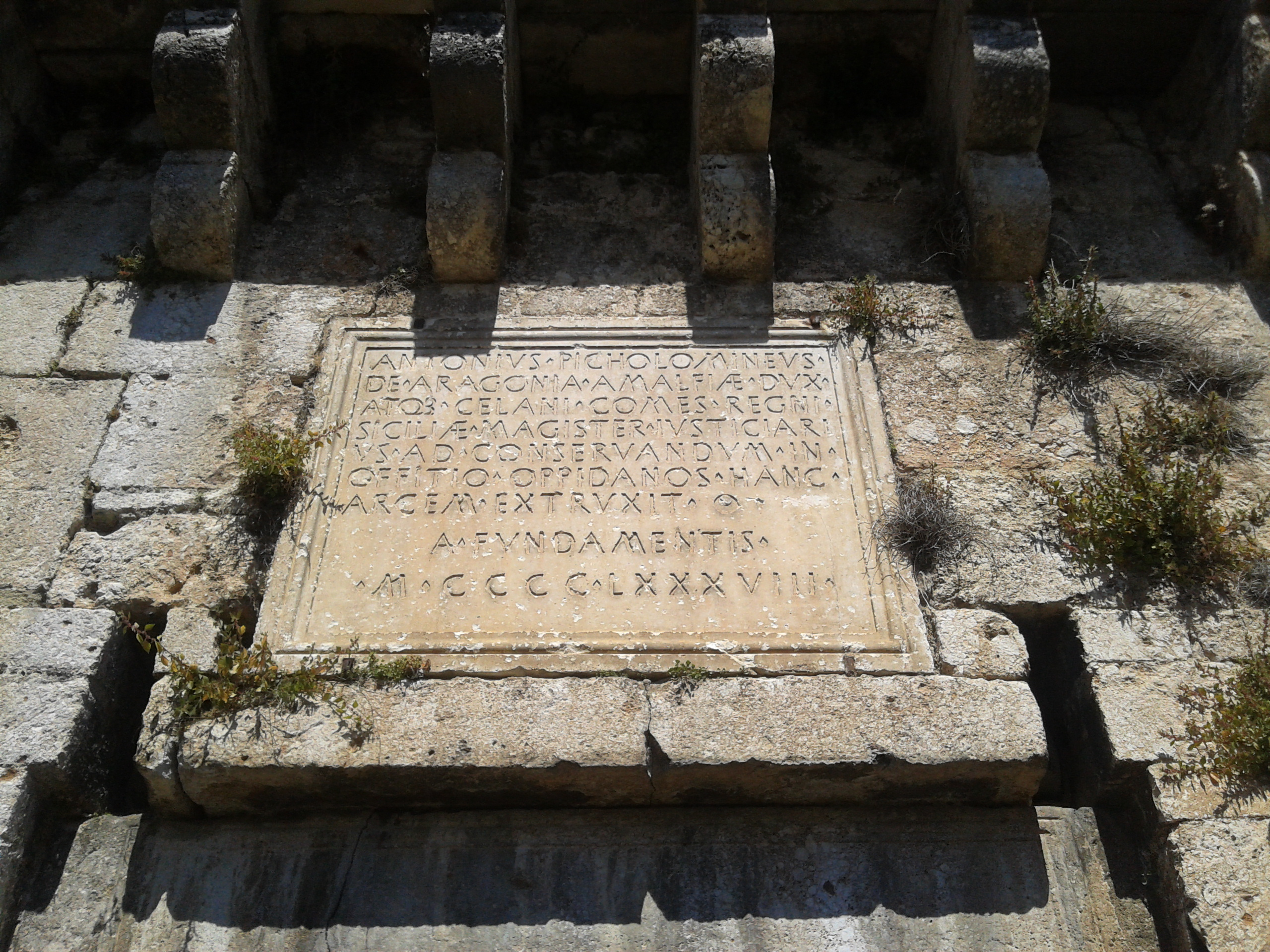
Plaque above the castle portal

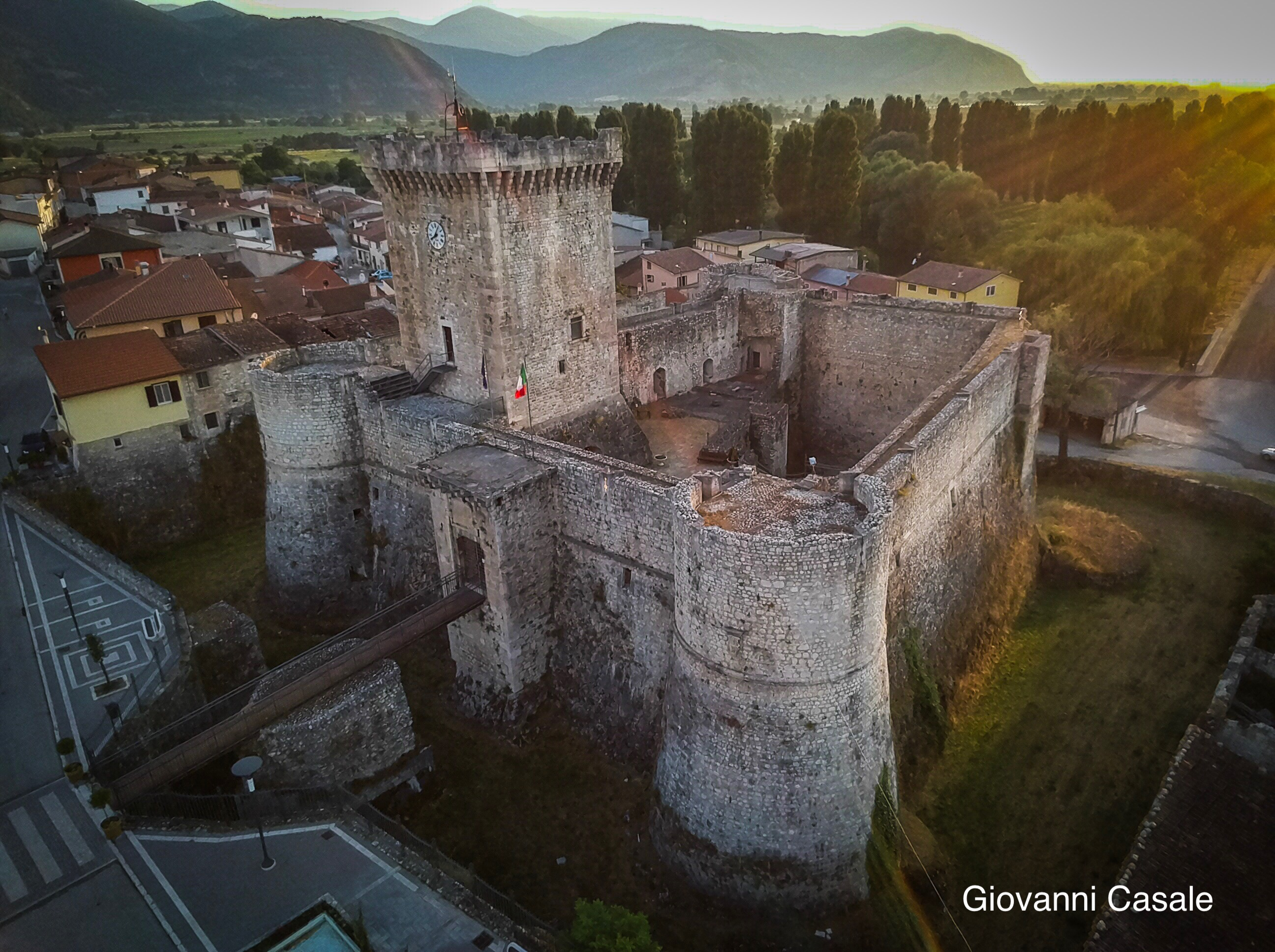
Aerial view of the castle

The Piccolomini Castle originally stood on the island of Ortucchio by Lake Fucino. The structure was surrounded by a moat whose waters were connected to the lake. With the lake's drainage, this protection was lost.

The Renaissance-style structure was commissioned in 1488 by Antonio Todeschini Piccolomini following the destruction of a previous fortification by Napoleone Orsini.

Damaged by the 1915 Avezzano earthquake, the building was restored in the 1970s.

== Architecture ==
The castle has a rectangular plan with circular towers at the corners of the walls, with only the base remaining of the northwest tower. The entrance portal to the castle is located on the wall facing the village, and above the portal is a plaque bearing the date of the Piccolomini reconstruction.

Inside the walls is the keep, the oldest structure of the castle, characterized by battlements around its perimeter.
