= Pescina =

Comune in the province of L'Aquila, Abruzzo

- Comune
- Comune di Pescina
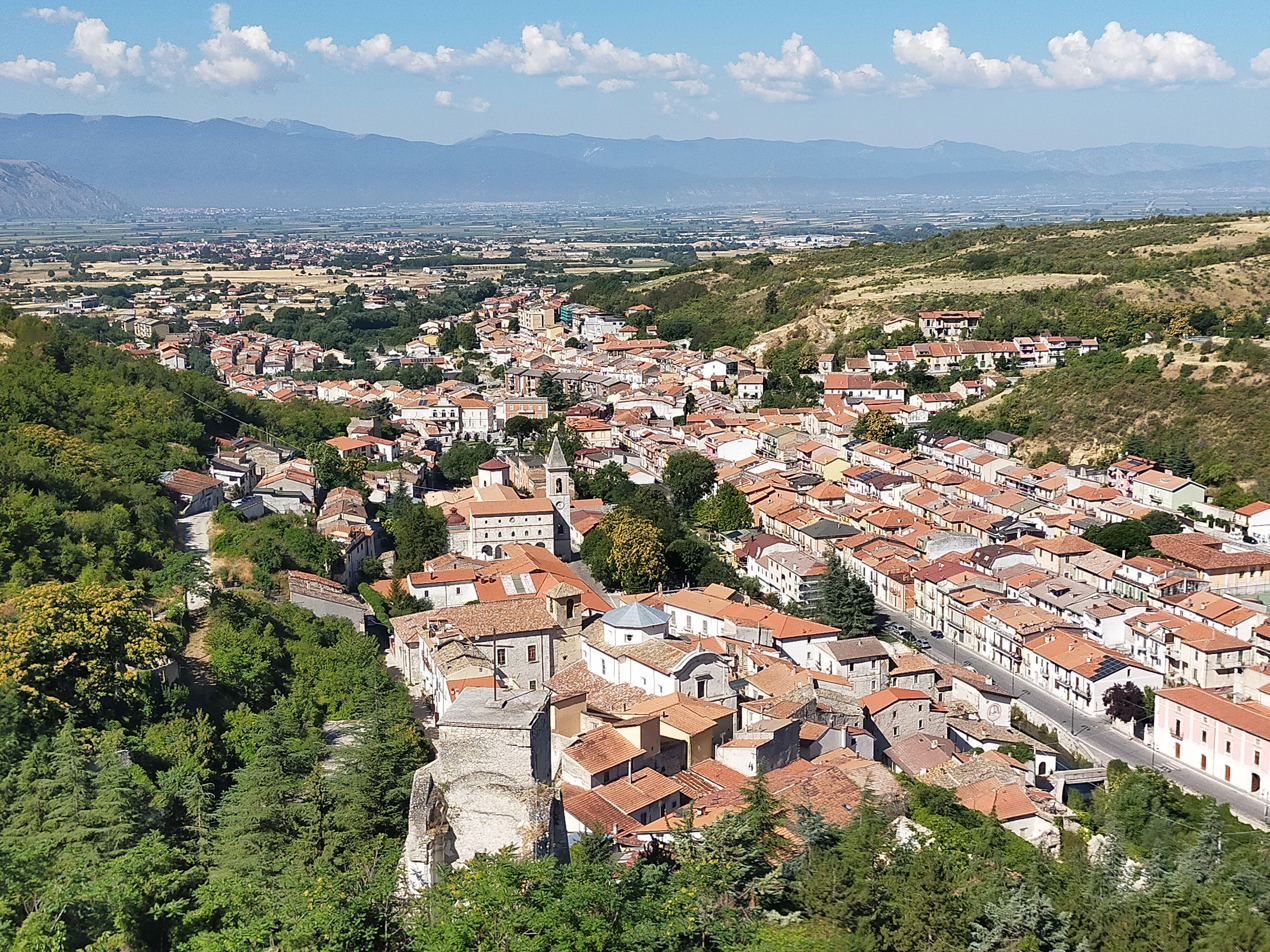

- Coat of arms

- Location within Italy Location within Abruzzo
- Coordinates: 42°1′35″N 13°39′32″E
- Country: Italy
- Region: Abruzzo
- Province: L'Aquila (AQ)
- Frazioni: Cardito, Venere

Government
  - Mayor: Luigi Soricone

Area
  - Total: 37.51 km^{2} (14.48 sq mi)
- Elevation: 735 m (2,411 ft)

Population (31 December 2013)
  - Total: 4,195
  - Density: 111.8/km^{2} (289.7/sq mi)
- Demonym: Pescinesi
- Time zone: UTC+1 (CET)
  - Summer (DST): UTC+2 (CEST)
- Postal code: 67057
- Dialing code: 0863
- Website: Official website

Pescina (pronounced [peʃˈʃiːna]) is a township and comune in the province of L'Aquila, Abruzzo, central Italy. It is a part of the mountain community Valle del Giovenco.

== History ==
=== 1915 Avezzano earthquake ===
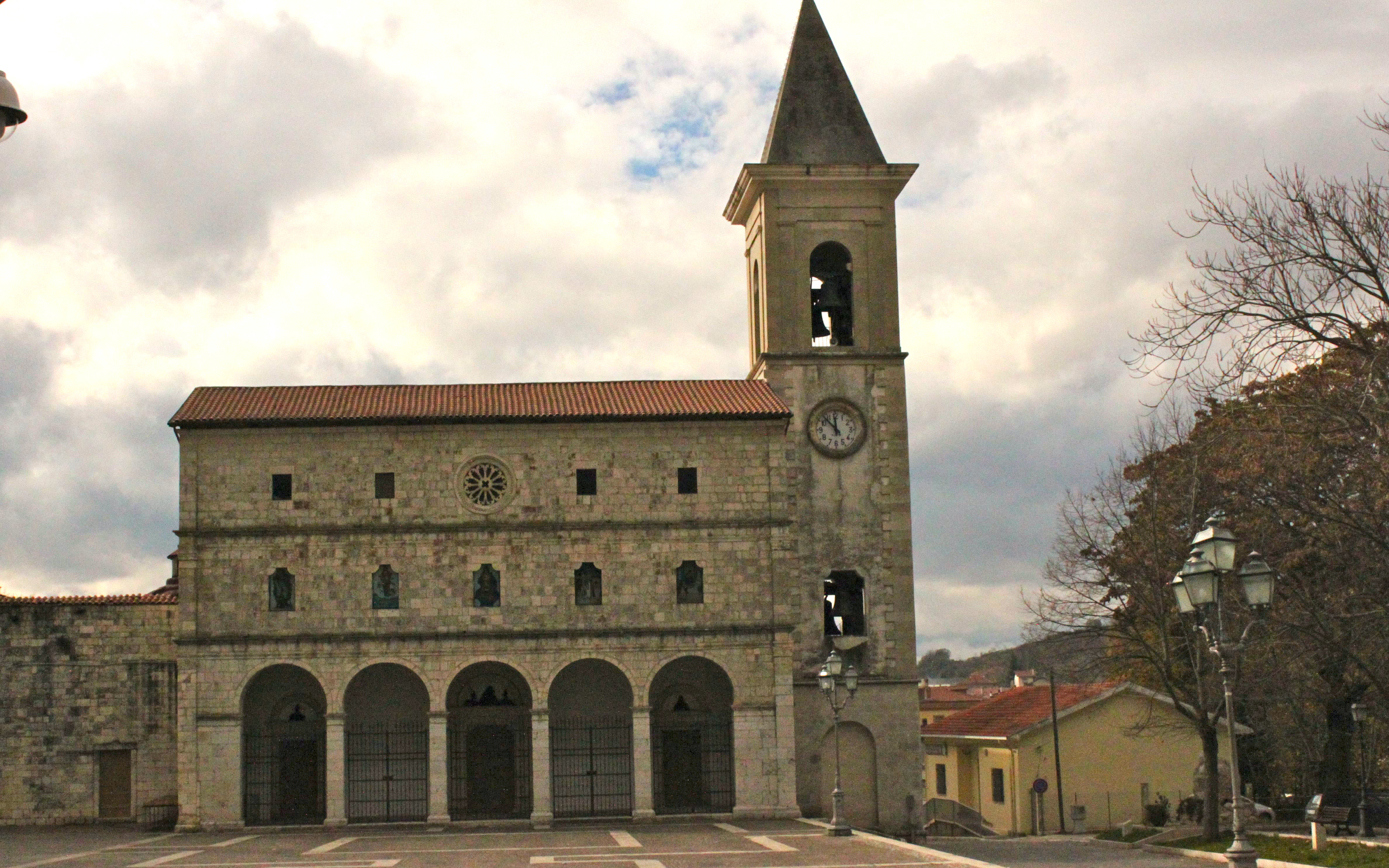
Cathedral of Pescina

The earthquake of 13 January 1915 affected the Marsica area, situated in the interior of Abruzzo. It was one of the most catastrophic earthquakes to strike the region, killing 30,000 people in Avezzano and the surrounding area. The main shock occurred at 7:48 AM local time and was judged to be X (Extreme) on the Mercalli intensity scale, while the initial aftershock was estimated to be VII (Very strong) on the Mercalli intensity scale. It was felt throughout all of central Italy.

The earthquake completely destroyed Pescina, with 5,000 people dying out of a total population of 6,000. The few who survived were generally severely injured and remained homeless since all the town buildings were destroyed. The earthquake completely isolated the area, and news of the disaster was only learned in the late afternoon. Rescuers left on the evening of the 13th, arriving only the day after because landslides and debris caused the roads to be impassable.

The seismic event brought to light the lack of preparedness of the Italian state. Eminio Sipari, member of Parliament for the electoral district of Pescina, protested that many victims would have been saved if proper precautions were in place. The continuation of World War I, which had begun in the autumn of 1914, brought troops to the region and secured permanent forces in the affected area.

The earthquake also created interest in the Appennine Mountains, which had not seen such disastrous earthquakes before 1915. People with no geological competence developed theories to explain the earthquake, blaming human activities in the area. In this case, the drainage of Lake Fucino was credited as a cause. However, as with all previous earthquakes, the earthquake was caused by the movement and release of pent-up energy of an important tectonic fault.

Like most other areas of Italy, Pescina still has a diaspora in North America. The families of Galli and Villanucci, which have had a presence in Pescina since at least 1880, have members in at least two American cities: Portland, Maine and Providence, Rhode Island.

== Geography ==
Pescina borders the communes of Celano, Collarmele, Gioia dei Marsi, Ortona dei Marsi, Ortucchio, Ovindoli, San Benedetto dei Marsi, and Trasacco.

=== Climate ===
Located in the flatland areas of the province, Pescina has a milder climate compared to other towns and cities in Abruzzo, with temperatures averaging between 2.5 °C (36.5 °F) in the colder months (such as January) to 22.9 °C (73.2 °F) in the warmer months. Rainfall is relatively heavy, averaging 820 millimetres (32.3 in) annually and occurring primarily in the late autumn. In the winter, snowfall can also be relatively abundant.

== Attractions ==
=== Pescina Cathedral ===
Pescina Cathedral was built in the 15th century. From 1526 the crypt housed the relics of Berardo dei Marsi. In 1915 it was damaged by the earthquake in Avezzano, and restored after the Second World War. The church itself blends various architectural styles. The Renaissance facade is decorated with a large rose window. The base is decorated with a porch and three gates. The interior has three Renaissance and Baroque naves and retains some medieval frescoes. The bell tower is a large three-story tower that houses an ancient bell dedicated to Berardo dei Marsi.

=== Old village ===
Tower Piccolomini

The old village of Pescina was the oldest part of the town, built in the 14th century. The village also had a castle, later dismantled, from which today survives the ancient tower of the Piccolomini family. In 1915 the earthquake destroyed much of the old town; buildings collapsed, and only the bell tower remained standing.

The writer Ignazio Silone set his novel Fontamara in Pescina. Today a portion of the old village has been partially restored and renovated.

=== Museum of Ignazio Silone ===
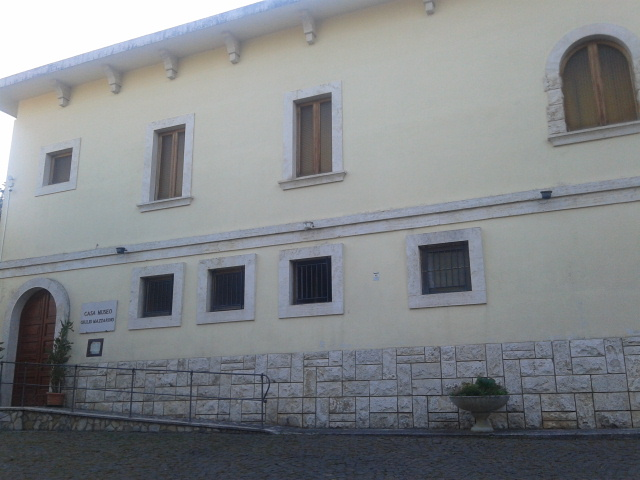
Home Cardinal Mazzarino Museum

The Museum of Ignazio Silone was built in his birthplace, and was one of the few buildings to survive the earthquake of 1915. It contains several manuscripts and original letters from the author.

=== Home of Cardinal Giulio Mazzarino ===
Cardinal Jules Mazarin was a famous man of the Church who worked in Paris alongside Cardinal Richelieu. His fame was such that the writer Alexandre Dumas included him as a character in his novels The Viscount Brangelonne and Twenty Years After, which deal with the Three Musketeers.

The original home of Mazarin was shaped like a castle, but it was destroyed by the earthquake in 1915. The new house was rebuilt respecting the original architectural style of the home but has some differences. The house contains precious memories and manuscripts of the French cardinals and houses a private collection of Baroque art.

== Notable people ==
- Cardinal Mazarin, successor of Cardinal Richelieu to the regency of France
- Domenico Morfeo, footballer
- Ignazio Silone, author
- Michele Mazzarino, Cardinal and brother of Cardinal Mazarin
- Luciano Zauri, footballer
- Paolo Marso, Italian humanist and poet

== Twin towns ==
Pescina is twinned with:

- Józsefváros, eighth district of the city of Budapest, Hungary
