= Collelongo =

- Comune
- Comune di Collelongo
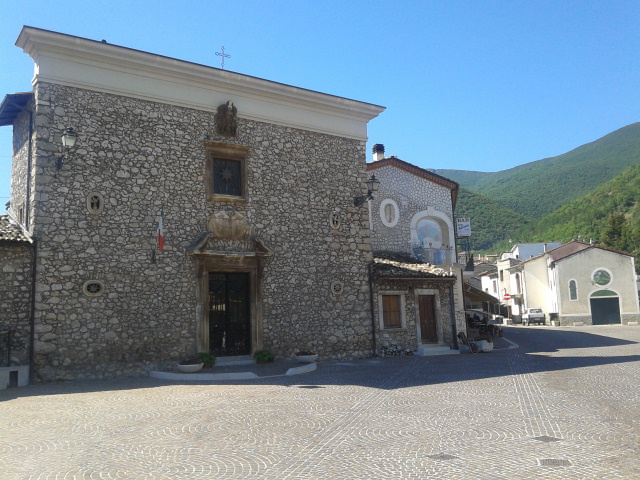
- Church of Madonna del Rosario.

- Location within Italy Location within Abruzzo
- Coordinates: 41°53′16″N 13°35′9″E
- Country: Italy
- Region: Abruzzo
- Province: L'Aquila (AQ)
- Frazioni: Balsorano, Civita d'Antino, Lecce nei Marsi, Ortucchio, San Vincenzo Valle Roveto, Trasacco, Villavallelonga

Government
  - Mayor: Rosanna Salucci

Area
  - Total: 57.09 km^{2} (22.04 sq mi)
- Elevation: 915 m (3,002 ft)

Population (31 December 2023)
  - Total: 1,070
  - Density: 18.7/km^{2} (48.5/sq mi)
- Demonym: Collelonghesi
- Time zone: UTC+1 (CET)
  - Summer (DST): UTC+2 (CEST)
- Postal code: 67050
- Dialing code: 0863
- ISTAT code: 066039
- Patron saint: St. Roch
- Saint day: 16 August
- Website: Official website

Collelongo (Marsicano: Chëllonghë) is a comune and town in the province of L'Aquila in the Abruzzo region of southern Italy.
