= Ortona dei Marsi =

- Comune
- Comune di Ortona dei Marsi
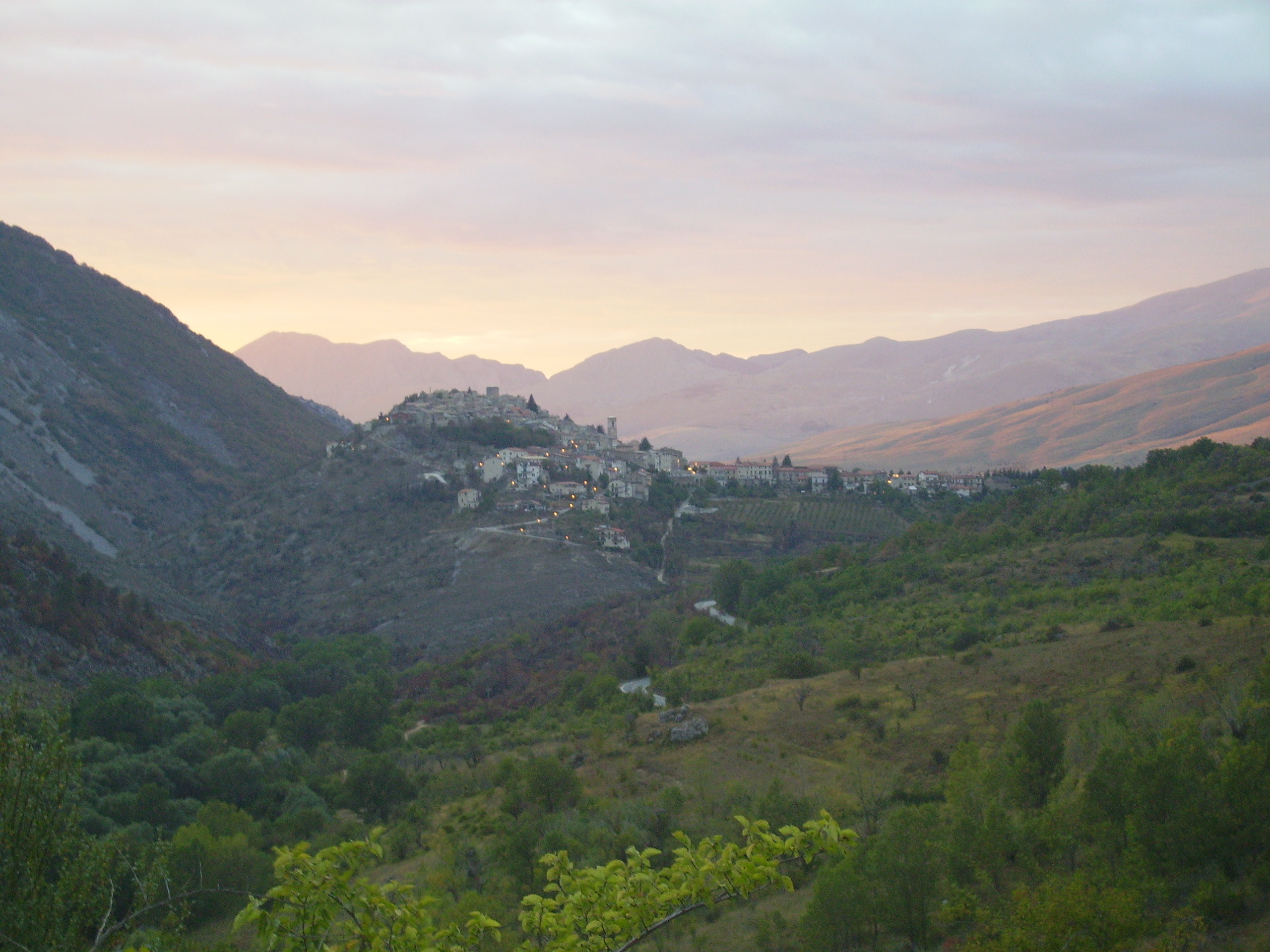
- View of Ortona dei Marsi

- Location within Italy Location within Abruzzo
- Coordinates: 41°59′54″N 13°43′44″E
- Country: Italy
- Region: Abruzzo
- Province: L'Aquila (AQ)
- Frazioni: Aschi, Carrito, Castiglione, Cesoli, Rivoli, Santa Maria Maddalena, Sulla Villa

Area
  - Total: 52.48 km^{2} (20.26 sq mi)
- Elevation: 1,058 m (3,471 ft)

Population (2005)
  - Total: 737
  - Density: 14.0/km^{2} (36.4/sq mi)
- Demonym: Ortonesi
- Time zone: UTC+1 (CET)
  - Summer (DST): UTC+2 (CEST)
- Postal code: 67050
- Dialing code: 0863
- Patron saint: San Generoso
- Saint day: May 8
- Website: Official website

Ortona dei Marsi is a comune and town in the province of L'Aquila in the Abruzzo region of central Italy. It is included in traditional area of Marsica. The commune is part of the National Park of Abruzzo, Lazio and Molise. Ortona dei Marsi is situated on 1000 meters above sea level and the mountains that surround the valley reach up to 1,800 meters.

== History ==
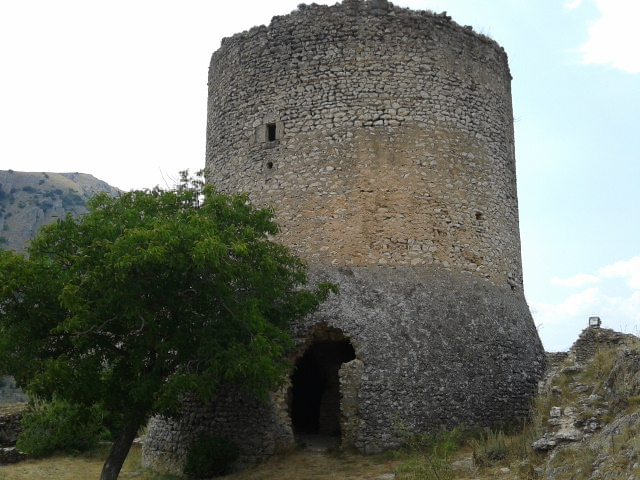
Medieval tower of Ortona dei Marsi

=== Earliest history ===
Included in the territory between the towns of Rivoli and Cesoli are located the megalithic stones and the remains of the fortifications that would belong to the ancient city of Marsi, Milonia (or Milionia). Its territory has given birth to the leader Quintus Poppaedius Silo who commanded the "Marsic Group" against Rome in Social War (91-87 BC) to obtain the rights of citizenship.

=== Middle Ages ===
In two ancient documents of the eighteenth century about Ortona four churches appear. Around the church of Sant'Onofrio was built the ancient village of Ortona that turned out between alliances of Rainaldo, count of Celano.

=== Modern and Contemporary Age ===
In the fifteenth century Giampaolo Cantelmo was appointed count of Ortona and Carrito dei Marsi. In the sixteenth century the bishop of Pescina elevated the church of San Giovanni Battista to a collegiate church. In the eighteenth century, serious natural disasters caused many inhabitants to move in the countryside around Rome. In 1915 the country has been seriously damaged by the earthquake of Avezzano. In the twentieth century the country was marked by the emigration. Many of its inhabitants moved to large Italian cities and to the United States of America.

Fathers and sons traveled to America seeking seasonal employment during the warm weather and returned to Italy in the Winter. Eventually most of the seasonal workers brought their families and settled in the Greater Boston area prior to the rapidly changing immigration laws (Emergency Immigration Act of 1921, the Johnson Quota Act, and the Immigration Act of 1924). The North End, Boston, Haverhill, Brockton, Revere, Quincy, and Pittsfield Massachusetts were home to many Ortona dei Marsi families. Other families migrated to Latin America, especially to Argentina and Brazil.

== Geography ==
=== Topography ===
The commune is part of the territory of National Park of Abruzzo, Lazio and Molise. Included as part of the municipal territory are several villages: Aschi Alto, Carrito, Castiglione, Cesoli, Rivoli, Santa Maria and Sulla Villa.

== Main sights ==
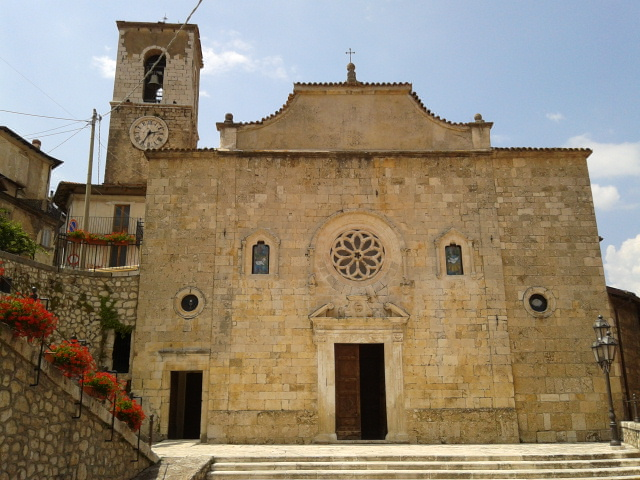
Church of St. John the Baptist

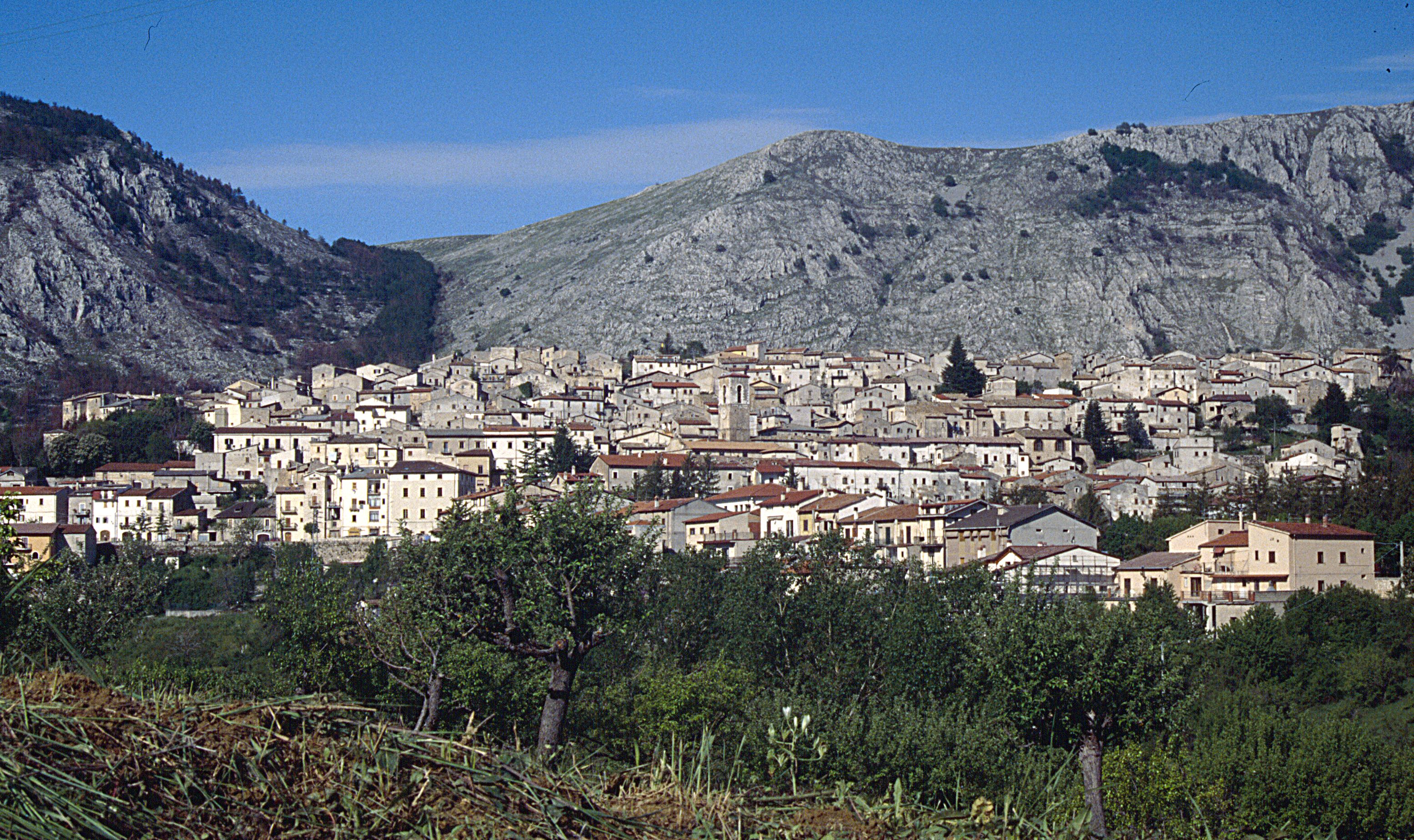
View of Ortona dei Marsi

- Church of St. John the Baptist, probably dates from the fourteenth century. In the sixteenth century was elevated to collegiate church.
- Church of Sant'Onofrio.
- Church of Sant'Antonio Abate.
- Churches of Carrito, Cesoli and Aschi Alto.
- Feudal tower built in the thirteenth century

== See also ==
- Marsica
- National Park of Abruzzo, Lazio and Molise
- 1915 Avezzano earthquake
- Roman Catholic Diocese of Avezzano
