= Marsi =

Italic tribe in Ancient Italy

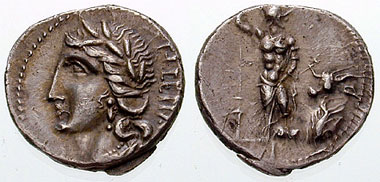
Silver denarius, coinage of the Marsian Confederation, during the Social War (89 BC). The retrograde legend right (UILETIV [víteliú = Italia] (Note: For the Phonetic_transcription from Oscan to Latin alphabet see, for example, this page or this one. All of the Oscan monetary legends are retrograde, just like the one running clockwise on the copy reproduced in the margin.)) is in Oscan

The Marsi were an Italic people of ancient Italy, whose chief centre was Marruvium, on the eastern shore of Lake Fucinus (which was drained in the time of Claudius). The area in which they lived is now called Marsica. They originally spoke a language now termed Marsian, which is attested by several inscriptions.

== Mythological history ==
In his Natural History, Pliny the Elder regards the Marsi as descending from Telegonus, son of Odysseus and Circe, and suggests the Marsi (along with the Psylli of Ancient Libya) inherited from Circe's deep knowledge of poisons an immunity to viper venom, the secretion of a natural poison deadly to snakes, and the ability to send snakes to sleep.

== History ==
The Marsi were first mentioned as members of a confederacy with the Vestini, Paeligni and Marrucini. They joined the Samnites in 308 BC, and, on their submission, became allies of Rome in 304 BC. After a short-lived revolt two years later, for which they were punished by the loss of territory, they were readmitted to the Roman alliance and remained faithful down to the Social War, their contingent being always regarded as the flower of the Italian forces.

The Latin colony of Alba Fucens near the northwest corner of the lake was founded in the adjoining Aequian territory in 303 BC so that, from the beginning of the 3rd century, the Marsians were in touch with a Latin-speaking community, to say nothing of the Latin colony of Carsioli farther west. The earliest pure Latin inscriptions of the district seem to be C.I.L. IX 3827 and 3848 from the neighbourhood of Supinum; its character generally is of the Gracchan period, though it might be somewhat earlier.

In the Social War (91–87 BC) which, owing to the prominence of the Marsian rebels, is often known as the Marsic War, they fought bravely against odds under their leader Q. Pompaedius Silo and, though they were frequently defeated, the result of the war was the enfranchisement of the allies. All the coins of Pompaedius Silo have the Latin legend "Italia", while the other leaders in all but one case used Oscan.

== Religion ==
The sanctuary of Lucus Angitiae, the chief temple and grove of the goddess Angitia stood at the southwest corner of Lake Fucinus, near the inlet to the tunnel of Claudius and the village of Luco dei Marsi. Angitia was widely worshipped in the central highlands as a goddess of healing, especially skilled to cure serpent bites by charms and the herbs of the Marsian woods, which was carried out by local inhabitants until modern times. Their country was considered by Rome to be the home of witchcraft.

== See also ==
- Marsus (disambiguation), Latinisation of the name Marsi
- Umbrian language

== Bibliography ==
- Conway, Robert Seymour (1897). The Italic Dialects Edited with a Grammar and Glossary. Cambridge: University Press. pp. 289–299.

Attribution

- Endnote:
  - Conway, R. S. The Italic Dialects. pp. 290 seq. (from which some portions of this article are taken; on the Fucino-Bronze, ib. p. 294)
