= Collarmele =

- Comune
- Comune di Collarmele
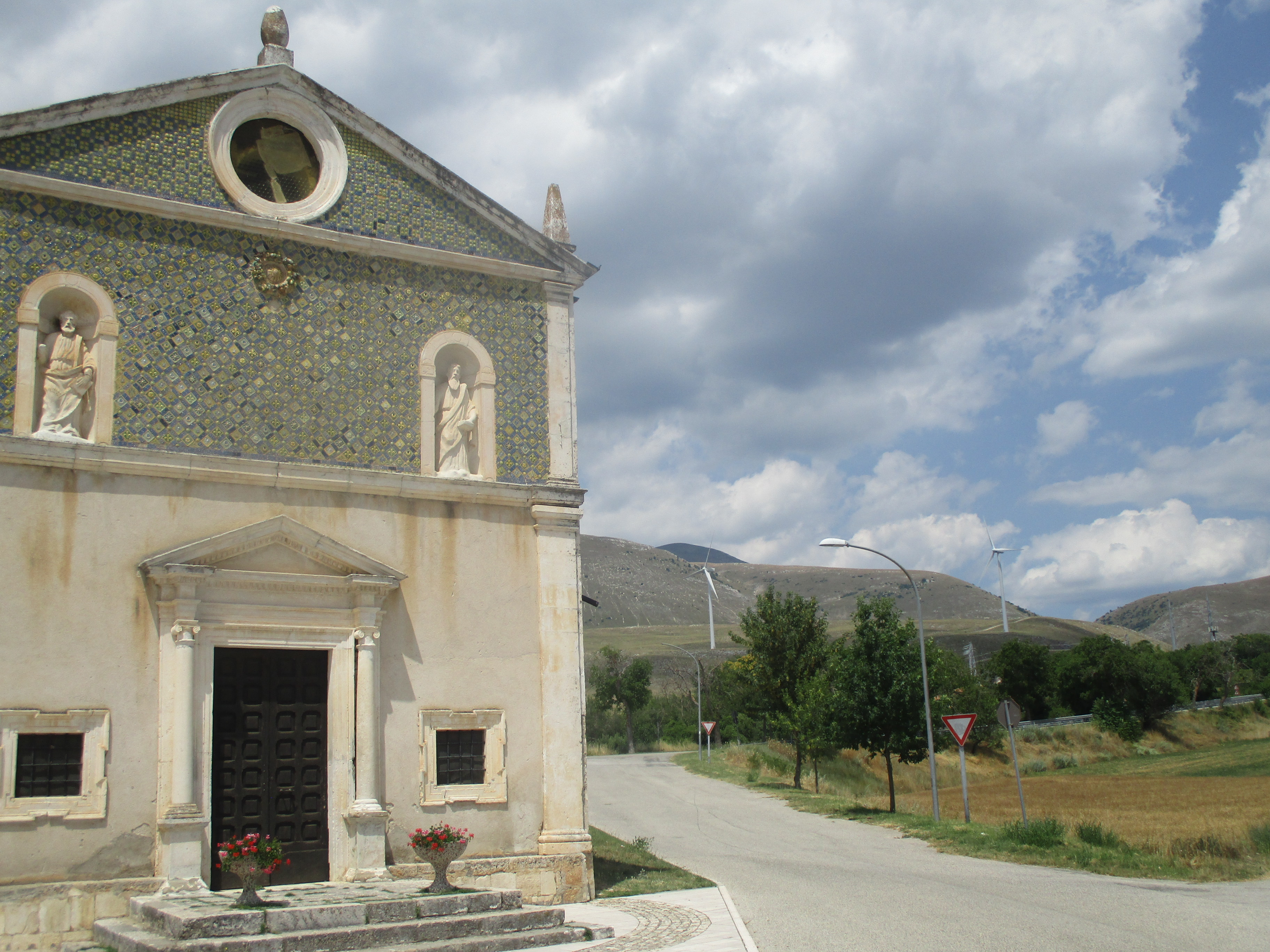

- Location within Italy Location within Abruzzo
- Coordinates: 42°3′36″N 13°37′36″E
- Country: Italy
- Region: Abruzzo
- Province: L'Aquila (AQ)
- Frazioni: Aielli, Celano, Cerchio, Pescina, San Benedetto dei Marsi

Area
  - Total: 23.71 km^{2} (9.15 sq mi)
- Elevation: 835 m (2,740 ft)

Population (31 December 2013)
  - Total: 921
  - Density: 38.8/km^{2} (101/sq mi)
- Demonym: Collarmelesi
- Time zone: UTC+1 (CET)
  - Summer (DST): UTC+2 (CEST)
- Postal code: 67040
- Dialing code: 0863
- ISTAT code: 066038
- Patron saint: Santa Felicita
- Saint day: 10 July

Collarmele is a comune and town in the Province of L'Aquila in the Abruzzo region of Italy
