= Bisegna =

- Comune
- Comune di Bisegna
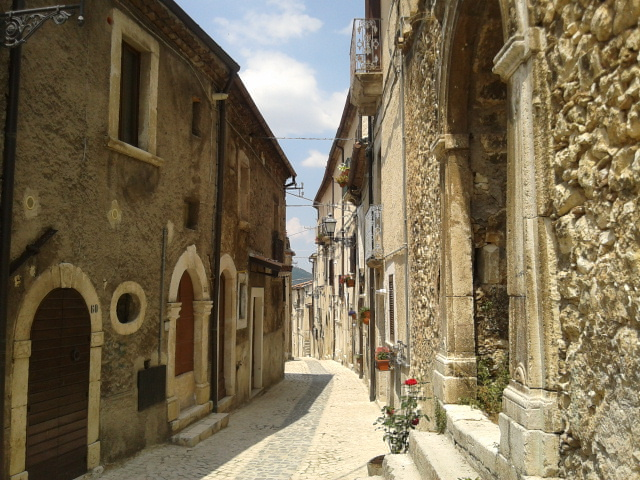
- Old town

- Location within Italy Location within Abruzzo
- Coordinates: 41°55′20″N 13°45′31″E
- Country: Italy
- Region: Abruzzo
- Province: L'Aquila (AQ)
- Frazioni: San Sebastiano dei Marsi

Area
  - Total: 46.40 km^{2} (17.92 sq mi)
- Elevation: 1,210 m (3,970 ft)

Population (31 December 2013)
  - Total: 249
  - Density: 5.37/km^{2} (13.9/sq mi)
- Demonym: Bisegnesi
- Time zone: UTC+1 (CET)
  - Summer (DST): UTC+2 (CEST)
- Postal code: 67050
- Dialing code: 0863
- ISTAT code: 066011
- Patron saint: San Rocco
- Saint day: 16 August
- Website: Official website

Bisegna is a comune and town in the Province of L'Aquila in the Abruzzo region of Italy.

== Climate ==
Climate data for Bisegna, elevation 1,216 m (3,990 ft), (1951–2000)
Month	Jan	Feb	Mar	Apr	May	Jun	Jul	Aug	Sep	Oct	Nov	Dec	Year
Mean daily maximum °C (°F)	4.8 (40.6)	5.2 (41.4)	7.8 (46.0)	11.0 (51.8)	16.6 (61.9)	20.5 (68.9)	24.1 (75.4)	24.1 (75.4)	19.6 (67.3)	14.4 (57.9)	9.1 (48.4)	5.7 (42.3)	13.6 (56.4)
Daily mean °C (°F)	1.3 (34.3)	1.4 (34.5)	3.8 (38.8)	6.6 (43.9)	11.6 (52.9)	15.1 (59.2)	18.2 (64.8)	18.3 (64.9)	14.5 (58.1)	10.1 (50.2)	5.5 (41.9)	2.4 (36.3)	9.1 (48.3)
Mean daily minimum °C (°F)	−2.1 (28.2)	−2.2 (28.0)	−0.3 (31.5)	2.3 (36.1)	6.7 (44.1)	9.6 (49.3)	12.4 (54.3)	12.5 (54.5)	9.4 (48.9)	5.8 (42.4)	1.9 (35.4)	−1.0 (30.2)	4.6 (40.2)
Average precipitation mm (inches)	75.0 (2.95)	85.1 (3.35)	76.1 (3.00)	83.1 (3.27)	57.5 (2.26)	49.1 (1.93)	33.4 (1.31)	36.4 (1.43)	65.3 (2.57)	97.9 (3.85)	129.9 (5.11)	122.7 (4.83)	911.5 (35.86)
Average precipitation days	9.0	9.4	8.8	10.8	8.1	6.6	4.5	4.9	6.1	8.2	10.6	10.8	97.8
Source: Regione Abruzzo
