= Civitella Roveto =

- Comune
- Comune di Civitella Roveto
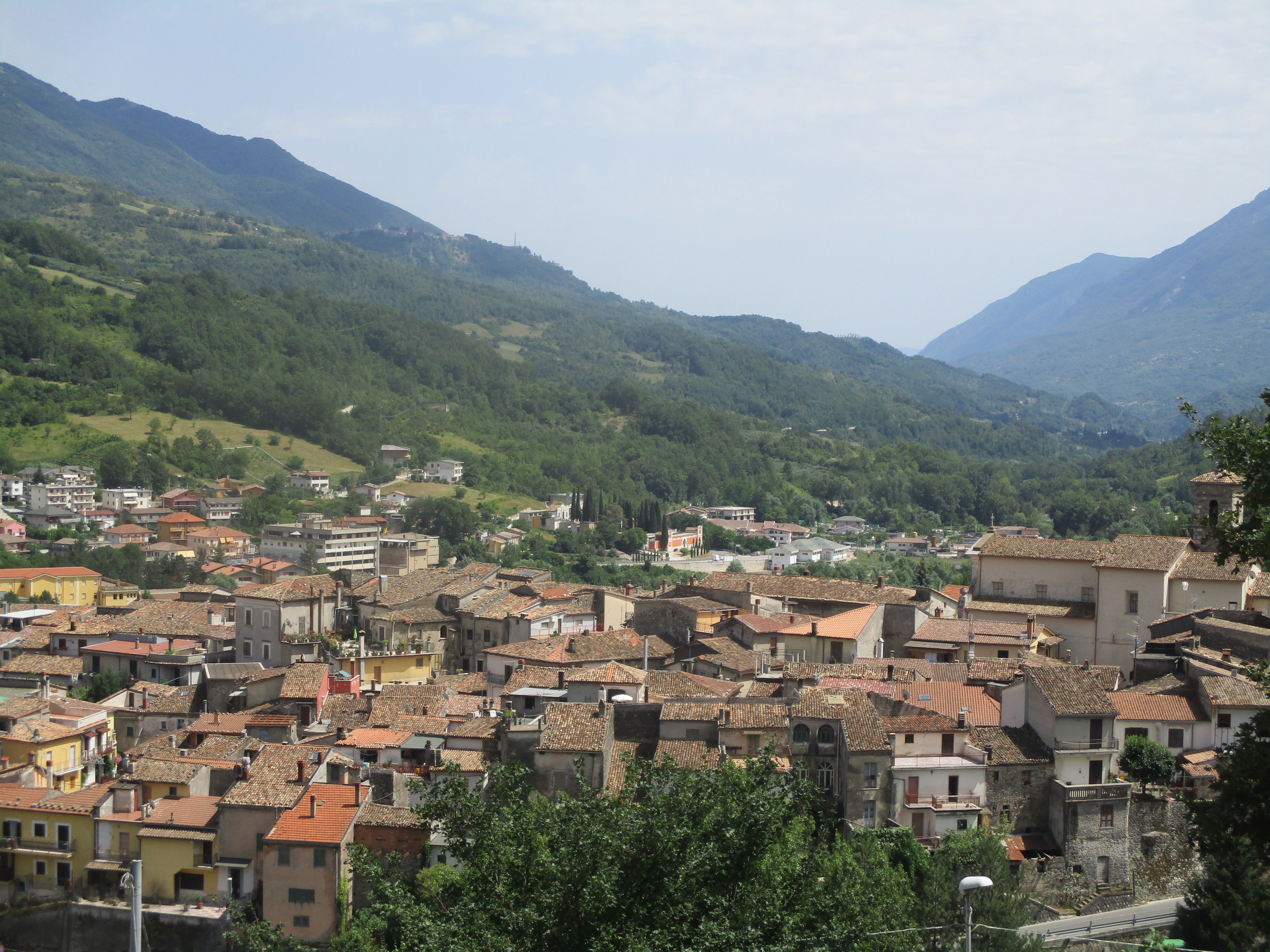

- Location within Italy Location within Abruzzo
- Coordinates: 41°55′1″N 13°25′40″E
- Country: Italy
- Region: Abruzzo
- Province: L'Aquila (AQ)
- Frazioni: Case di Spaccio, Meta, Peschiera, Polverelli, San Savino

Government
  - Mayor: Raffaellino Tolli

Area
  - Total: 45.33 km^{2} (17.50 sq mi)
- Elevation: 528 m (1,732 ft)

Population (31 July 2015)
  - Total: 3,292
  - Density: 72.62/km^{2} (188.1/sq mi)
- Demonym: Civitellesi
- Time zone: UTC+1 (CET)
  - Summer (DST): UTC+2 (CEST)
- Postal code: 67054
- Dialing code: 0863
- Patron saint: St. John the Baptist
- Saint day: 24 June
- Website: Official website

Civitella Roveto (Abruzzese: Civëtèllë) is a comune and town in the province of L'Aquila in the Abruzzo region of central Italy.

== Geography ==
The town isin the Marsica region, located in the center of the Roveto valley, on the slopes of the Cantari mountains under the Mount Viglio (2 156 m). The ancient nucleus of Civitella Roveto was on the western side of the Liri River.

== Twin towns ==
Civitella Roveto is twinned with:

- Cessieu, France
- Domașnea, Romania
- Erythres, Greece
