= Rocca di Botte =

- Comune
- Comune di Rocca di Botte
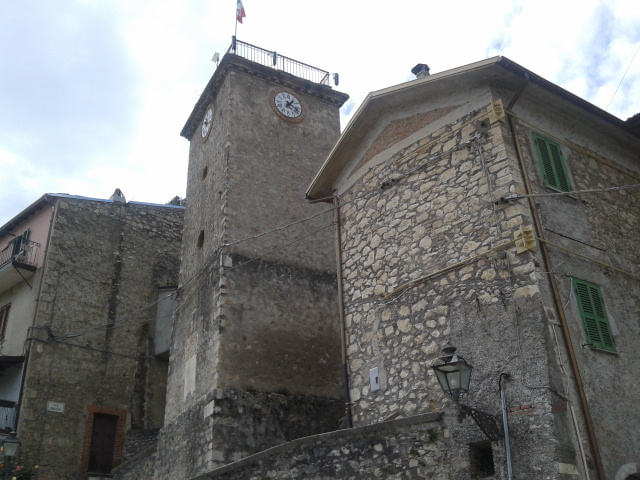
- Old town

- Coat of arms

- Location within Italy Location within Abruzzo
- Coordinates: 42°1′38″N 13°4′7″E
- Country: Italy
- Region: Abruzzo
- Province: L'Aquila (AQ)

Government
  - Mayor: Fernando Antonio Marzolini

Area
  - Total: 27.68 km^{2} (10.69 sq mi)
- Elevation: 750 m (2,460 ft)

Population (31 December 2021)
  - Total: 861
  - Density: 31.1/km^{2} (80.6/sq mi)
- Demonym: Roccatani
- Time zone: UTC+1 (CET)
  - Summer (DST): UTC+2 (CEST)
- Postal code: 67066
- Dialing code: 0863
- Patron saint: St. Peter the Hermit
- Saint day: 30 August
- Website: Official website

Rocca di Botte is a comune and town of 860 people in the province of L'Aquila, Abruzzo, central Italy.

== History ==
During the Middle Ages the town was known as Rocca de Bucte, according to documents dating back to the 12th century. In the 17th century Rocca di Botte suffered a serious outbreak of plague, which caused a sharp depopulation. In 1496 the town became a fief of the Roman family of the Colonna thanks to a donation made by Ferdinand II of Naples.
