= San Benedetto dei Marsi =

- Comune
- Comune di San Benedetto dei Marsi
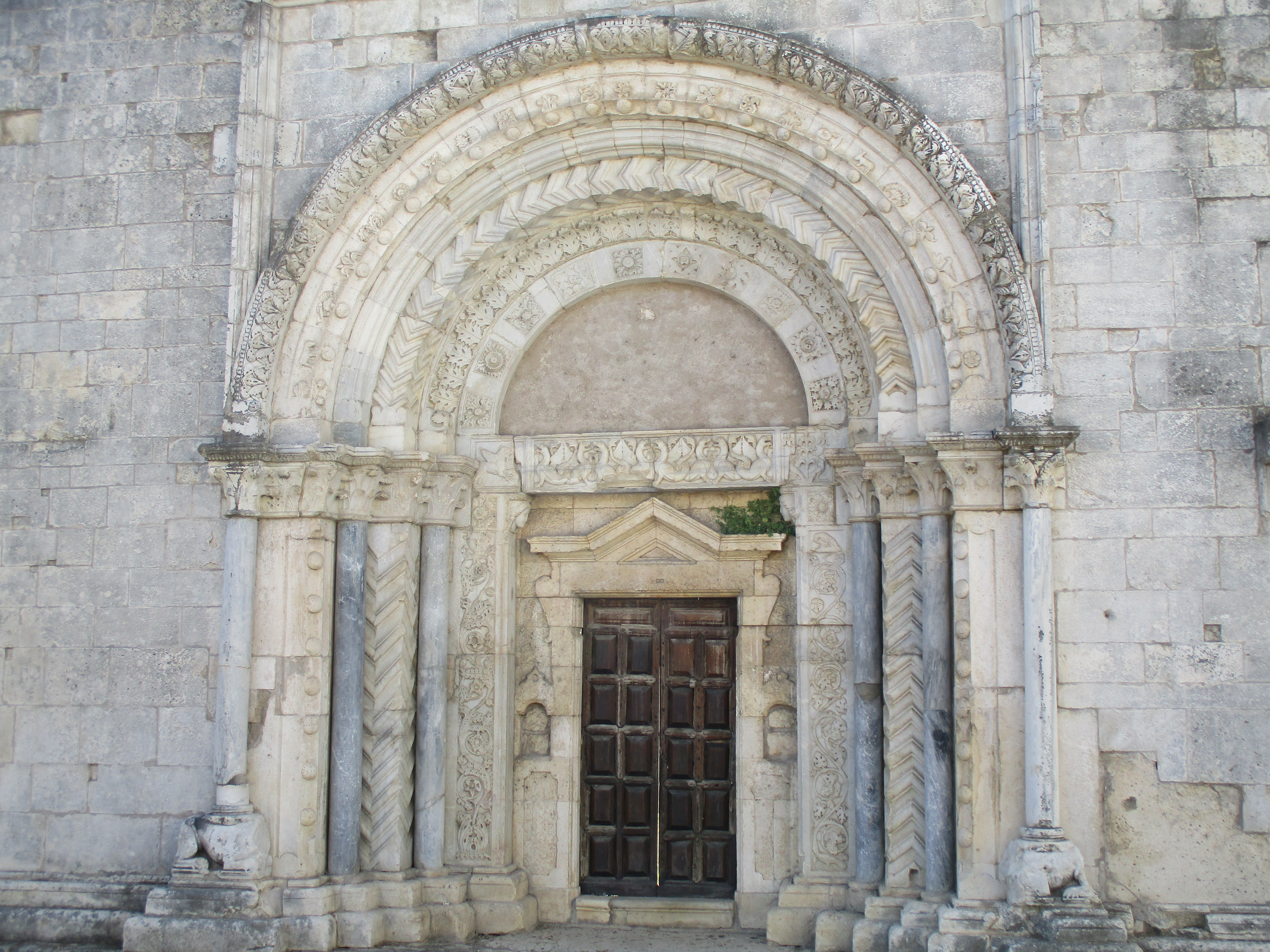
- Portal of the church of Santa Sabina.

- Location within Italy Location within Abruzzo
- Coordinates: 42°00′14.51″N 13°37′9.69″E
- Country: Italy
- Region: Abruzzo
- Province: L'Aquila (AQ)

Government
  - Mayor: Quirino D'Orazio

Area
  - Total: 25.25 km^{2} (9.75 sq mi)
- Elevation: 678 m (2,224 ft)

Population (30 November 2017)
  - Total: 3,909
  - Density: 154.8/km^{2} (401.0/sq mi)
- Demonym: Sambenedettesi
- Time zone: UTC+1 (CET)
  - Summer (DST): UTC+2 (CEST)
- Postal code: 67058
- Dialing code: 0863
- Saint day: June 1
- Website: Official website

San Benedetto dei Marsi (Latin: Marruvium, Marrubium; Ancient Greek: Μαρούϊον, romanized: Maroúïon) is a comune and town in the province of L'Aquila in the Abruzzo region of central Italy. It is on the eastern shore of the dried Lake Fucino, 20 kilometres (12 mi) from the remains of another ancient site, Alba Fucens.

Near the town is the stream Giovenco, identified as the ancient stream known as Pitonius.

== History ==
The ancient Marruvium was the chief city of the Italic tribe of the Marsi; Marruvii or Marrubii is another form of the name of the Marsi, and was used by Virgil as an ethnic appellation.

In accordance with this, Silius Italicus also describes Marruvium as deriving its name from a certain Marrus, who is evidently only an eponymous hero of the Marsi. There is no account of Marruvium, however, previous to the Roman conquest of the Marsic territory; but under the Roman Empire it was a flourishing municipal town; it is noticed as such both by Strabo and Pliny, and in inscriptions we find it called "splendidissima civitas Marsorum Marruvium".

It was also called Civitas Marsorum, and, in the Middle Ages, Civitas Marsicana. It is noticed in the Tabula Peutingeriana, which places it 13 Roman miles from Alba; but it was not situated on the Via Valeria, and must have communicated with that high-road by a branch from Cerfennia.

The town was an episcopal see in the Middle Ages, being destroyed in 1340 during the Angevine wars for the conquest of the Kingdom of Naples. In 1580 the see was moved to the neighboring town of Pescina.

== Main sights ==
Considerable ruins of the ancient city still remain, including portions of its walls and the remains of an amphitheatre, and numerous inscriptions, as well as statues, have been discovered on the site. These ruins are situated close to the margin of the lake, about 3 kilometres (2 mi) below Pescina.

== Climate ==
Climate data for San Benedetto dei Marsi, elevation 687 m (2,254 ft), (1951–2000)
Month	Jan	Feb	Mar	Apr	May	Jun	Jul	Aug	Sep	Oct	Nov	Dec	Year
Mean daily maximum °C (°F)	6.9 (44.4)	9.1 (48.4)	12.6 (54.7)	16.2 (61.2)	21.6 (70.9)	25.5 (77.9)	28.7 (83.7)	29.1 (84.4)	24.6 (76.3)	18.9 (66.0)	12.0 (53.6)	7.7 (45.9)	17.7 (64.0)
Daily mean °C (°F)	2.3 (36.1)	4.0 (39.2)	6.9 (44.4)	9.9 (49.8)	14.5 (58.1)	17.8 (64.0)	20.4 (68.7)	20.7 (69.3)	17.0 (62.6)	12.2 (54.0)	6.9 (44.4)	3.3 (37.9)	11.3 (52.4)
Mean daily minimum °C (°F)	−2.3 (27.9)	−1.2 (29.8)	1.0 (33.8)	3.6 (38.5)	7.4 (45.3)	10.2 (50.4)	12.1 (53.8)	12.2 (54.0)	9.5 (49.1)	5.6 (42.1)	1.7 (35.1)	−1.0 (30.2)	4.9 (40.8)
Average precipitation mm (inches)	48.7 (1.92)	50.7 (2.00)	43.8 (1.72)	51.1 (2.01)	39.7 (1.56)	31.7 (1.25)	24.6 (0.97)	30.9 (1.22)	49.8 (1.96)	72.7 (2.86)	91.5 (3.60)	73.5 (2.89)	608.7 (23.96)
Average precipitation days	7.3	7.2	7.8	8.9	7.3	5.2	3.8	4.0	5.9	7.1	9.7	8.9	83.1
Source: Regione Abruzzo
