= Aielli =

- Comune
- Comune di Aielli
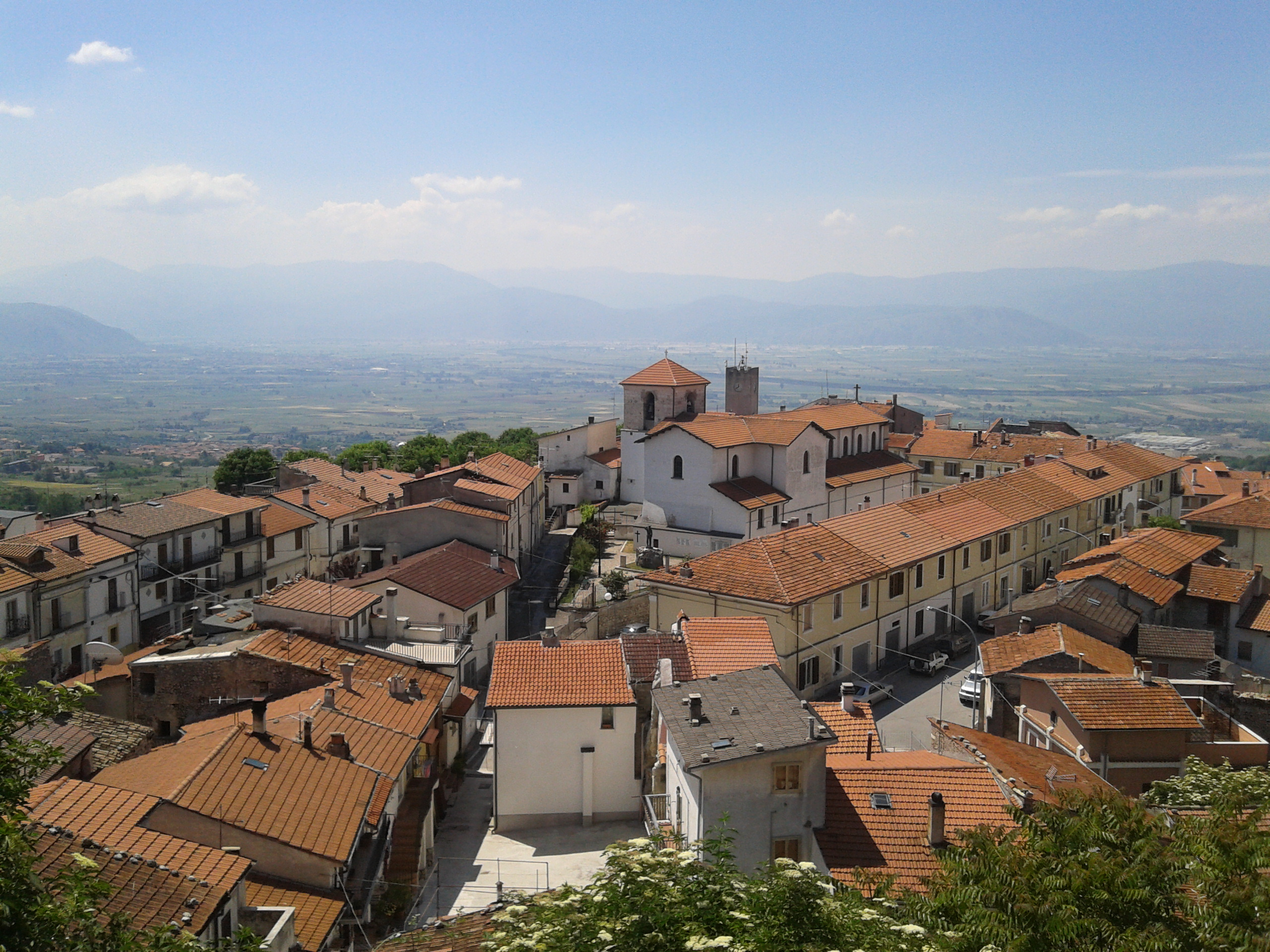

- Flag

- Location of Aielli in Italy Aielli (Abruzzo)
- Coordinates: 42°04′54″N 13°35′29″E
- Country: Italy
- Region: Abruzzo
- Province: L'Aquila (AQ)
- Frazioni: Aielli Stazione

Government
  - Mayor: Enzo Di Natale

Area
  - Total: 35 km^{2} (14 sq mi)
- Elevation: 1,021 m (3,350 ft)

Population (31 August 2016)
  - Total: 1,469
  - Density: 42/km^{2} (110/sq mi)
- Demonym: Aiellesi
- Time zone: UTC+1 (CET)
  - Summer (DST): UTC+2 (CEST)
- Postal code: 67041
- Dialing code: 0863
- Saint day: July 7
- Website: Official website

Aielli (Abruzzese: Aéjje) is a comune and town in the Province of L'Aquila in the Abruzzo region of Italy. It is located in the plain of the former Lake Fucino, in the Marsica.

Aielli was mentioned as Ajelli for the first time in 1280, deriving from the Latin Agellum. It was damaged by the 1915 Avezzano earthquake.

It has a medieval tower, now housing a public-open astronomical observatory.
