= Lecce nei Marsi =

- Comune
- Comune di Lecce nei Marsi
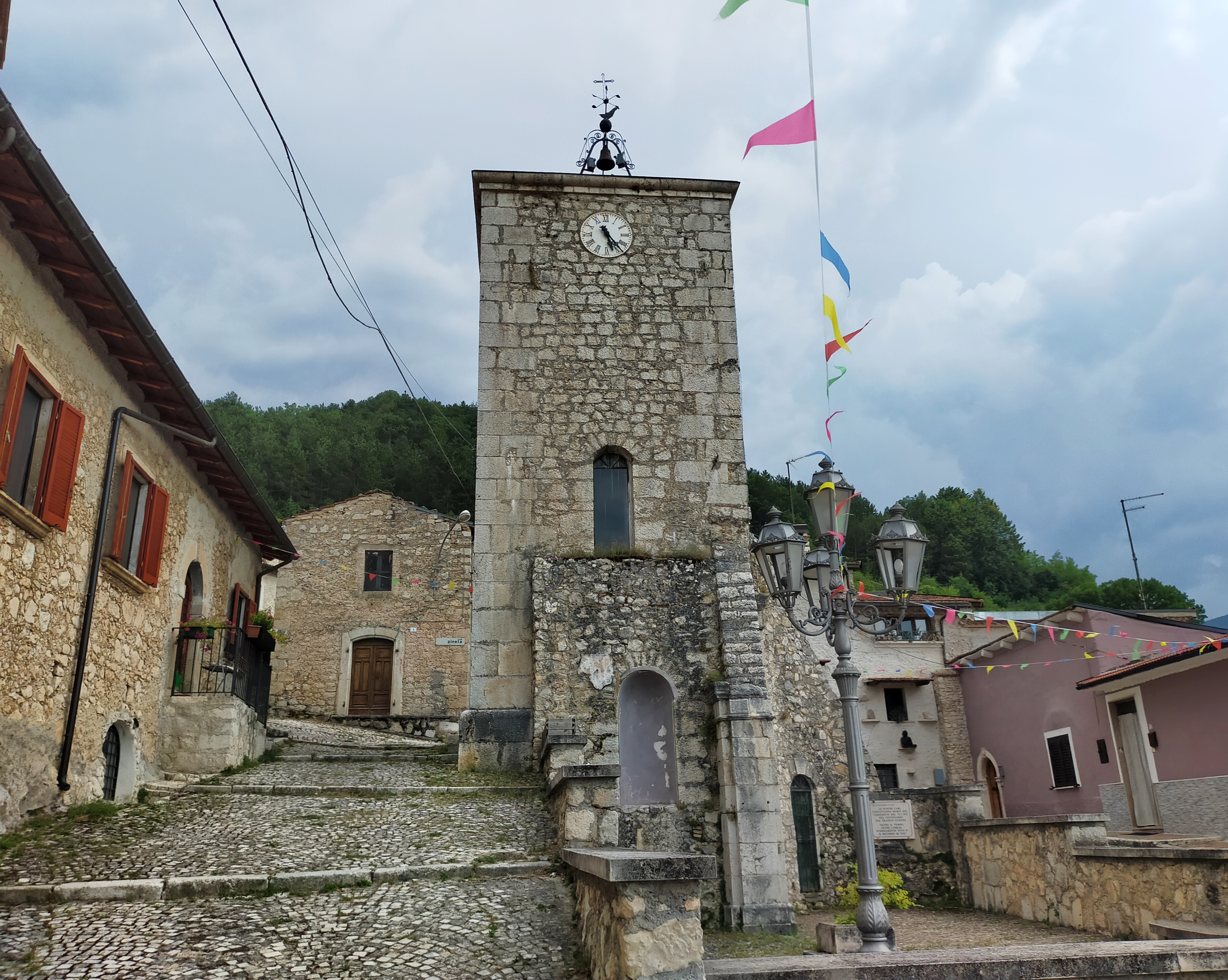
- Tower of the church of S. Martino in Agne.

- Location within Italy Location within Abruzzo
- Coordinates: 41°56′5″N 13°41′16″E
- Country: Italy
- Region: Abruzzo
- Province: L'Aquila (AQ)
- Frazioni: Vallemora, Lecce Vecchio

Government
  - Mayor: Augusto Barile

Area
  - Total: 66 km^{2} (25 sq mi)
- Elevation: 740 m (2,430 ft)

Population (30 April 2017)
  - Total: 1,694
  - Density: 26/km^{2} (66/sq mi)
- Demonym: Leccesi
- Time zone: UTC+1 (CET)
  - Summer (DST): UTC+2 (CEST)
- Postal code: 67050
- Dialing code: 0863
- Patron saint: St. Blaise
- Saint day: Last Sunday in September
- Website: Official website

Lecce nei Marsi is a comune and town in the province of L'Aquila in the Abruzzo region of Italy.

It is located near the Fucino Lake plain, in the Marsica.
