= Trasacco =

- Comune
- Comune di Trasacco
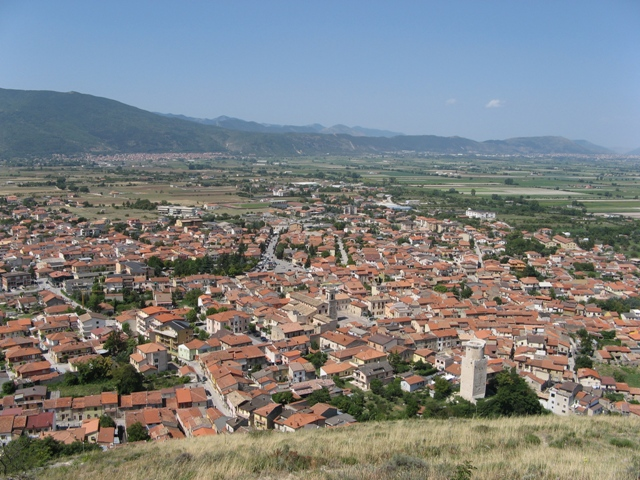

- Location within Italy Location within Abruzzo
- Coordinates: 41°57′28″N 13°32′7″E
- Country: Italy
- Region: Abruzzo
- Province: L'Aquila (AQ)
- Frazioni: Strada 37 del Fucino, Strada 38 del Fucino

Government
  - Mayor: Mario Quaglieri (Continuity and Innovation)

Area
  - Total: 51.40 km^{2} (19.85 sq mi)
- Elevation: 685 m (2,247 ft)

Population (30 November 2016)
  - Total: 6,241
  - Density: 121.4/km^{2} (314.5/sq mi)
- Demonym: Trasaccani
- Time zone: UTC+1 (CET)
  - Summer (DST): UTC+2 (CEST)
- Postal code: 67059
- Dialing code: 0863
- ISTAT code: 066102
- Patron saint: San Cesidio
- Saint day: 31 August
- Website: Official website

Trasacco (Marsicano: Trasacchë) is a comune and town in the province of L'Aquila in the Abruzzo region of central-eastern Italy.
