= Gatti =

Gatti is an Italian surname. Notable people with the surname include:

- Alessandra Mirka Gatti (born 1969), Italian Eurobeat singer
- Annibale Gatti (1828–1909), Italian 19th-century fresco painter
- Armand Gatti (1924–2017), French playwright
- Arturo Gatti (1972–2009), Italian-Canadian professional boxer
- Attilio Gatti (1892–1969), Italian explorer of Africa
- Bernardino Gatti (c. 1495–1576), Italian painter of the Renaissance
- Bruno Gatti (1941–2012), Swiss footballer
- Carlo Gatti (1817–1878), Swiss entrepreneur in the Victorian era
- Carmine Biagio Gatti (born 1988), Italian professional football player
- Claudio Gatti (born 1955), Italian investigative journalist based in New York City
- Daniele Gatti (born 1961), Italian conductor
- Darío Javier Franco Gatti (born 1969), Argentine football manager and a former international footballer
- Eduardo Gatti (born 1949), Chilean singer-songwriter
- Elena Gatti Caporaso (1918–1999), Italian socialist politician and feminist
- Emilio Gatti (1922–2016), Italian engineer and professor of nuclear electronics at the Politecnico of Milan
- Enrico Gatti (born 1955), Italian violinist, known for playing Baroque music
- Enrique Gatti, German musician of the English and German indie rock band Art Brut
- Fabio Gatti (born 1982), Italian footballer
- Fabrizio Gatti (born 1966), Italian investigative journalist and author
- Federico Gatti (born 1998), Italian professional footballer
- Fortunato Gatti (early 17th century) was an Italian painter active near Parma and Modena
- Franco Gatti (1942–2022), the founder of the Italian group Ricchi e Poveri
- Gabriele Gatti (born 1953), Sammarinese politician
- Gabriella Gatti (1908–2003), Italian operatic soprano
- Gervasio Gatti (c. 1550–c. 1631), Italian late-Renaissance painter, active in Parma, Piacenza, and Cremona
- Giacomo Gatti (died 1817), Italian painter of the late-Baroque, active mainly in his native Mantua
- Girolamo Gatti (1682–1726), Italian painter, active mainly in Bologna.
- Giulio Gatti-Casazza (1869–1940), Italian opera manager
- Guido Carlo Gatti (1938–2024), Italian former basketball player
- Gustavo Gatti (born 1972), Argentine footballer
- Hugo Gatti (1944–2025), Argentine football goalkeeper
- Isabelle Laure Gatti de Gamond (1839–1905), Belgian educationalist, feminist, and politician
- Joe Gatti (born 1967), Canadian former middleweight boxer
- John Maria Emilio Gatti, Sir (1872–1929), Anglo-Swiss theatre manager, restaurateur and businessman
- Lou Gatti (1915-1977), Australian rules footballer
- Lucas Cassius Gatti (born 1978), retired Argentine football midfielder
- Luigi Gatti (businessman) (1875–1912), restaurateur
- Luigi Gatti (composer) (1740–1817), Venetian classical composer
- Luigi Gatti (nuncio) (born 1946), Vatican diplomat
- Luigi Gatti (politician) (1913–1945), Italian politician
- Luigi Gatti (weightlifter), Italian weightlifter
- Marcello Gatti (1924–2013), Italian cinematographer
- María Ester Gatti de Islas (1918–2010), Uruguayan teacher and human rights activist
- Mauro Gatti (born 1937), a retired Italian professional football player and coach
- Nando Gatti (1927-date of death unknown), former South African international lawn bowler
- Natalia Gatti (born 1982), Argentine female football forward
- Oliviero Gatti (1579–1648), Italian painter and engraver
- Pierluigi Gatti (born 1938), Italian athlete
- Rafael Savério Gatti (born 1984), Brazilian football goalkeeper
- Riccardo Gatti (born 1997), Italian football player
- Roberta Gatti, Italian economist
- Roberto Gatti (born 1954), retired Italian football defender and later manager
- Saturnino Gatti (1463–1518), Italian painter and sculptor
- Simon Gatti (born 1981), Canadian soccer player
- Stanlee Gatti (born 1955), American event designer
- Theobaldo di Gatti (c.1650-1727), Florentine composer and musician
