= Museo d'Arte Sacra della Marsica =

Museum of religious art in Celano, Italy

Coordinates: 42.0846°N 13.5451°E

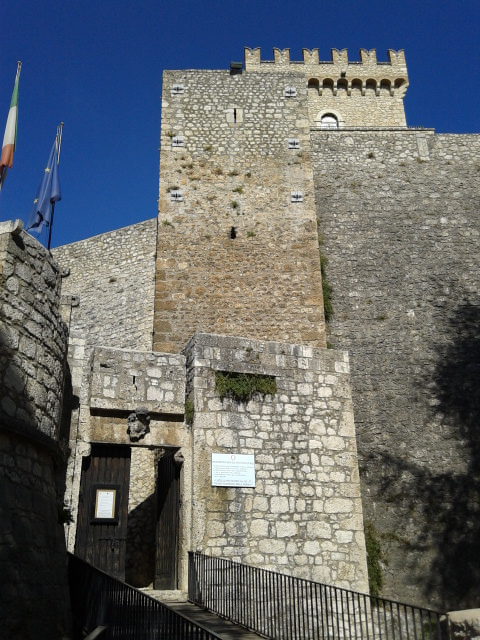
- Museo d'Arte Sacra della Marsica

- Location within Abruzzo
- Location: Celano
- Type: Religious art
- Website: http://www.museodellamarsica.beniculturali.it/

Museo d'Arte Sacra della Marsica (Italian for Religious art Museum of Marsica) is a museum of religious art in Celano, Province of L'Aquila (Abruzzo).

== History ==
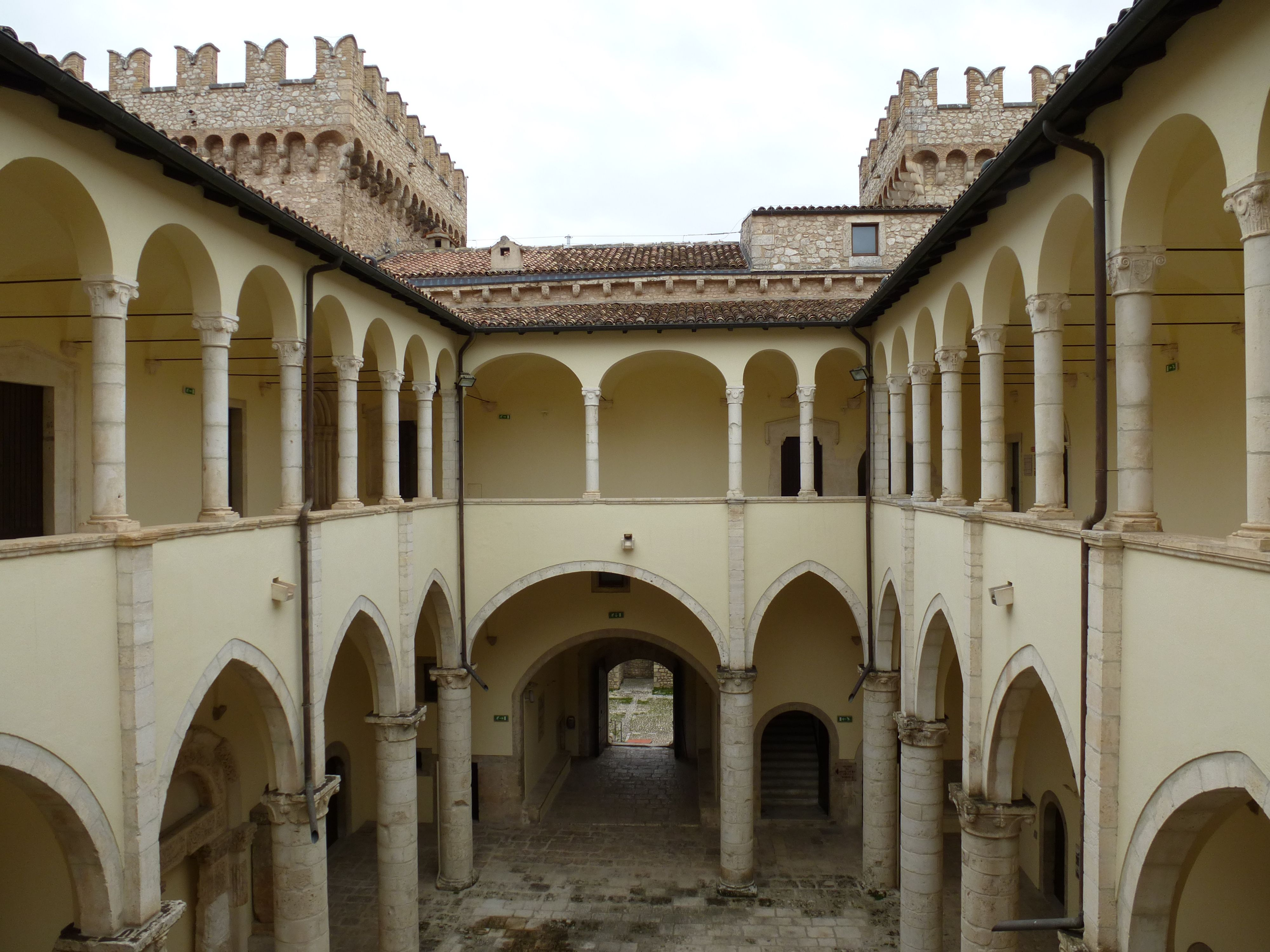
Interior of Castello Piccolomini

The Museum of Sacred Art of Marsica is a national museum housed in nine rooms within the Piccolomini Castle in Celano, AQ, in the Marsica region of Abruzzo.

The castle was founded in the late 14th century by the Berardi family, owners of the County of Celano, and later completed in the mid-15th century by the Piccolomini family who succeeded them. In the courtyard, remnants of 15th-century frescoes are visible, while some ground floor rooms house the archaeological section. The museum was set up in collaboration with the Diocese of Marsi.

The museum visit begins on the first floor: the rooms collect the major artistic expressions of Marsica in sculpture, painting, goldsmithing, and weaving, spanning from the 6th to the 18th centuries. Among other treasures, it houses a Crucifixion of Jesus from the school of Vincenzo Foppa, a bust of the Madonna from around 1440 by painter Andrea De Litio, considered his first executed work, and the stem cross of Cese from the 14th century. The collection also includes a series of Byzantine-style paintings and numerous Madonnas with Child from the 1200s.

The rooms are structured as follows:

- painting
- sculpture
- goldsmithing
- sacred vestments
- archaeological section

Some exhibited works come from the Church of Santa Maria in Cellis in Carsoli and from the Church of San Pietro near Alba Fucens in the municipality of Massa d'Albe, including a Virgin by Andrea De Litio. From Aielli come the restored and recomposed remains of two 1st-century BC bone beds recovered from four chamber tombs unearthed in 1936. In the courtyard, portals from the churches of San Nicola in Marano dei Marsi and San Salvatore in Paterno have been placed.

The Torlonia Collection, housed in the archaeology section, consists of 184 objects and 344 Roman bronze coins. These works were recovered during the draining of Lake Fucino. Among the highlights is a head of Aphrodite (3rd-2nd century BC). Many artifacts also originate from the site of Lucus Angitiae.

Since December 2014, it has been managed by the Ministry of Culture through the Abruzzo Museum Center, which became the Regional Directorate of Museums in December 2019.

== Collection ==
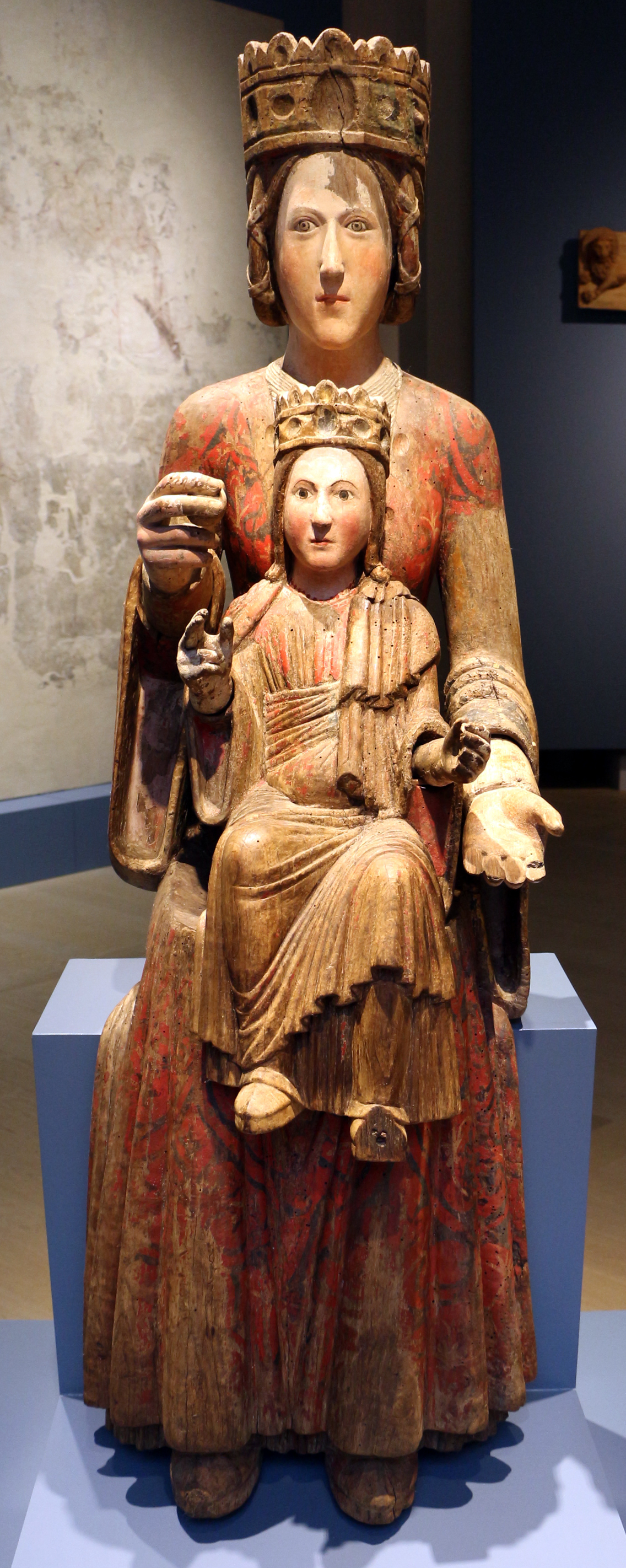
Madonna Enthroned with Child (1130), known as the Madonna of Castelli

The archaeological collection comes from excavations conducted in the territories of Avezzano, Luco dei Marsi, Collarmele, Alba Fucens, and San Benedetto dei Marsi. The archaeological path winds through a hall starting from the earliest periods, including the Paleolithic and Neolithic, with findings of flint spearheads evolving into iron and bronze, leading to early devotional sculptures of classical deities. Also included are objects like pottery, fibulae, and combs used in warfare or domestic settings, categorized by the gender of the deceased.

The most significant pieces are from the Torlonia Collection, relating to the drainers and princes of Lake Fucino, such as an ivory lion head and a large bas-relief, originally part of a larger single block that depicted three-dimensionally the city of Marruvium (the capital of the Marsi) near San Benedetto dei Marsi. This sculptural block represents a masterpiece of Abruzzese Roman sculpture, showing the walled city, sacred buildings, major temples, baths, and an amphitheater. On the right side, isolated in a forest, is the sanctuary of the goddess Angizia near Lucus Angitiae, close to modern-day Luco dei Marsi.

The archaeological collection extends to the late Lombard period, featuring panels that once adorned windows, cut and shaped in the form of a Greek cross, originating from vanished churches.

=== Stone Artifacts ===
Displayed are 27 works, all originating from the Church of San Pietro in Alba Fucens, dating between the 11th and 12th centuries. The artifacts consist of lintels from doorways or entire portals salvaged from destroyed churches, such as the 14th-century apostate portal from the Church of San Nicola in Marano dei Marsi, or the ruined Church of San Salvatore in Paterno (Avezzano), saved in the 19th century by Antonio De Nino, and initially installed at the Church of Carmine in Celano.

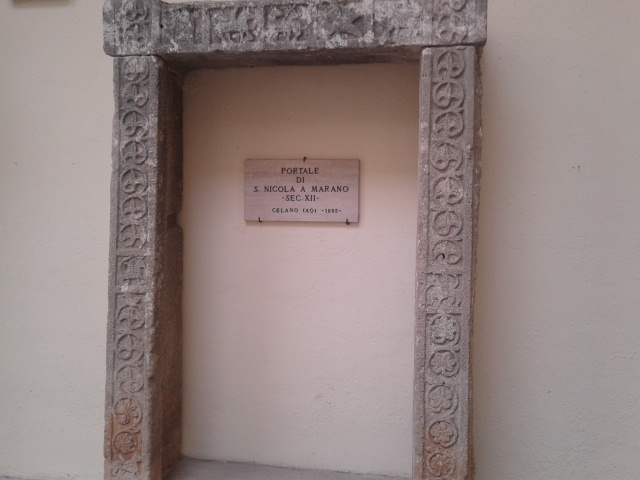
Medieval portal of the Church of San Nicola in Marano dei Marsi

From the Church of San Pietro in Alba Fucens, there is a Romanesque tombstone depicting two intertwined dragons on their necks, a square panel with a pierced rose window and intertwined ribbon frame, reflecting Lombard art. Also included is a panel with a griffin, a sculpture of a mermaid, a lion grasping a person, and a remarkable fragment studied by Pier Luigi Calore, Ignazio Carlo Gavini, Pietro Piccirilli, and Mario Moretti, depicting a mermaid with a half-human, half-fish appearance being grasped by a griffin.

=== Wooden Lintels ===
Lintels (unknown, 1132) The lintels originate from the Church of Santa Maria in Cellis in Carsoli and date back to 1132. After the 1915 Avezzano earthquake, they were transported to the National Museum of Abruzzo in L'Aquila (formerly the Civic Archaeological Museum) and later moved to Celano. The lintels depict scenes from the life of Christ: the Annunciation, the Visitation, the Nativity, the Announcement to the Shepherds, the Adoration of the Magi, the Massacre of the Innocents, the Presentation of Jesus at the Temple, Jesus among the Doctors of the Temple, with the last two scenes being indecipherable. A distinctive feature is that one door leaf is narrower than the other.

Lintels (unknown, 12th century) They come from the Church of San Pietro in Alba Fucens and are the most damaged in this room. Due to stylistic similarities, the author may be the same as those from Carsoli. The lintels were first taken to Rome for restoration and for a period were exhibited at the Palazzo Venezia Museum before being transferred to the National Museum of Abruzzo in L'Aquila. They finally found their place in Celano.

== Pinacoteca and Sculptures ==
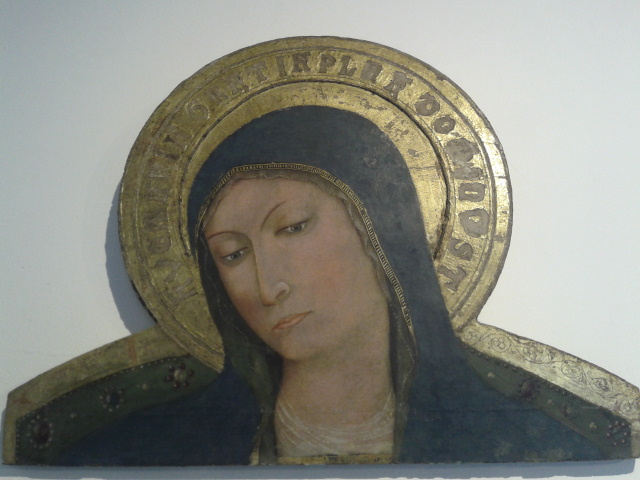
The Virgin known as Madonna of Cese, 15th-century tempera on panel by Andrea De Litio

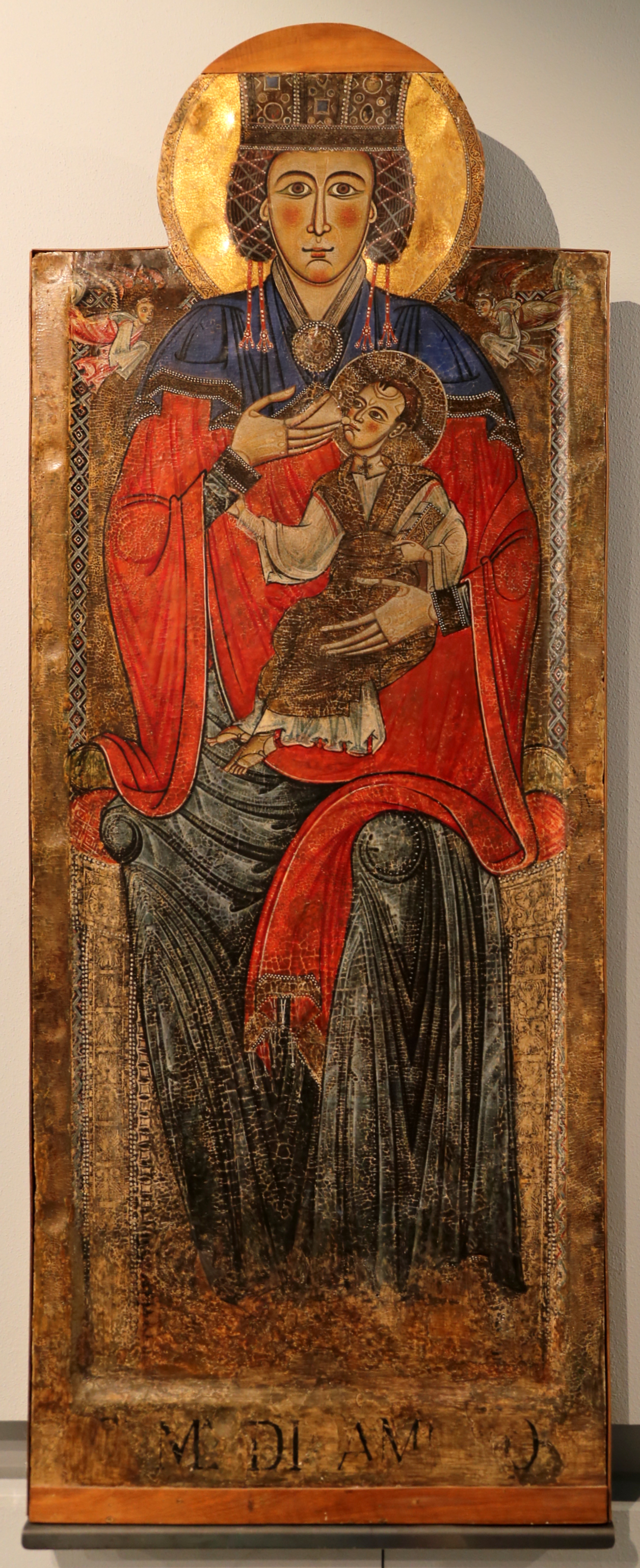
Madonna de Ambro, from MUNDA (L'Aquila), 13th century

Below is a partial list of the artworks on display:

- The Virgin, known as Madonna of Cese (Andrea De Litio, 15th century, tempera on panel). Originally from the church of Santa Maria in Cese, a hamlet of Avezzano. Dated between 1439 and 1442, it depicts the Madonna enthroned.
- Madonna of the Milk (unknown, 13th century, tempera on panel). From the church of Santa Vittoria in Carsoli. Damaged significantly by the 1915 Avezzano earthquake, the work is challenging to interpret artistically. It belongs to the extensive production of "Madonnas of the Milk" widespread in Abruzzo.
- Madonna and Child (unknown, 13th century, tempera on panel). From the church of Santa Maria Nuova in Collelongo. This panel, another example of Madonna of the Milk, is well preserved due to restoration in 1950. Unlike the other panel, this painting is likely by a local artist. Faint figures at the bottom include Saint Michael, another saint, and Mary Magdalene.
- Triptych of the "Madonna of Alba Fucens" (unknown, 13th-14th century): from the Church of San Pietro in Albe, consists of three wooden compartments lined with enamel plaques, gold leaf, crafted in a Byzantine model; the central compartment features the Madonna and Child adorned with rich red and gold garments, while the side compartments depict scenes from the life of Christ – the left from the Annunciation to the Arrest by Pilate and the right from the Flagellation to the Resurrection.
- Saint Peregrine and tabernacle (13th century): mentioned by Gavini and later by Moretti, from the Oratory of San Pellegrino in Bominaco; after the theft of the paintings from the side compartments of the tabernacle, which depicted scenes from the saint's life; the medieval statue has been repainted, but its ancient features are still visible.
- Madonna and Child, Saint Nicholas of Bari (?), Saint Michael the Archangel, and Mary Magdalene, painting on canvas applied to panel, 13th century, from the Church of Santa Maria Nuova in Collelongo (AQ).
- Triptych of the Madonna and Child with Saints (14th century) attributed to Saturnino Gatti, from MUNDA, Forte Spagnolo in L'Aquila.
- Madonna enthroned with Child, first half of the 15th century, polychrome wood, 114 x 53 x 17 cm, from the Church of Madonna del Carmine (or Assergi) in L'Aquila.
- "The Miracles of Saint Anthony of Padua" (Oil on canvas – 1566), attributed to Pompeo Cesura, from the Basilica of San Bernardino (L'Aquila).
- "Adoration of the Shepherds" (Oil on canvas – 1566) by Pompeo Cesura.
- Wooden statues depicting (from left): Saint John the Baptist, Saint Andrew, and Saint Peter (painted wood from the 17th century) – from the Church of Santa Maria in Luco dei Marsi.
- Statue of Saint Andrew (same author as the previous) – from the Church of Santa Maria in Luco dei Marsi.
- Madonna of the Milk known as "de Ambro" (mid-13th century), painted on carved wood panel; from MUNDA at Forte Spagnolo in L'Aquila, originally from the Church of Santa Maria in Graiano (San Pio di Fontecchio, AQ).

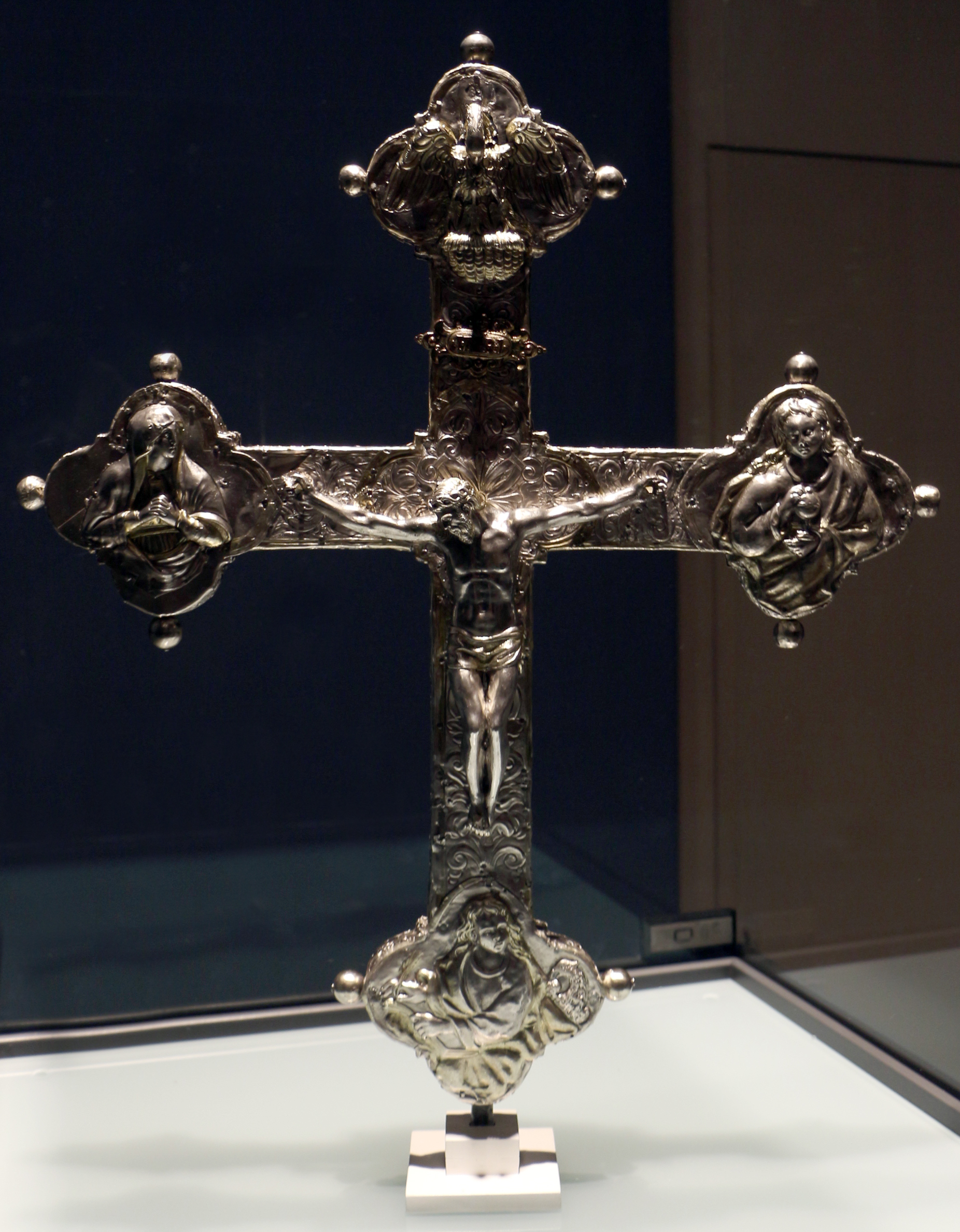
Processional astile cross from the Church of Santa Maria in Rosciolo dei Marsi (14th century)

- Crowned Madonna and Mystic Marriage of Saint Catherine of Alexandria (first half of the 15th century) by Matteo da Campli, tempera on panel, 104 x 53 cm, from Pizzoli (AQ), Church of Santa Maria del Paradiso.
- Diptych of the Madonna and Child and Crucifixion by Niccolò di Buonaccorso (15th century), from MUNDA in L'Aquila.
- Crucifixion on an astile silver cross (1334), from the Church of Santa Maria delle Grazie in Rosciolo dei Marsi.
- Panels of the tabernacle depicting the stories of Saint Eustace (late 14th century), by Nicolò di Pietransieri, known as the "Master of Campo di Giove"; two panels are inserted into frames with Gothic trilobate arches – from the Church of Sant'Eustachio (Campo di Giove), previously housed in the MUNDA.
- Fresco of Saint Elizabeth of Hungary (15th century), detached from the Church of San Pietro in Albe.
- Fresco of the Coronation of the Virgin Queen of Heaven (15th century), same author as Saint Elizabeth – detached fresco from the Church of San Pietro in Alba.
- Madonna and Child (mid-15th century), painted wooden statue by Silvestro di Giacomo from Sulmona, originally from the abbey of San Giovanni in Lucoli (AQ).
- Madonna enthroned with Child, known as "delli Castelli": Abruzzese Master (active in the 12th century), walnut wood sculpture, painted with polychrome and gilded, from Villa Re Quirino Celli, Castelli (TE).
- Illustrious Men of the Orsini (15th century) wall fresco detached from the halls of the Ducal Palace in Tagliacozzo (AQ), with candelabra and grotesque decorative motifs.
- "Saint John" and "Sorrowful Madonna", oil on panel (15th century) by Giovanni da Sulmona, from the Church of SS. Cesidio and Rufino in Trasacco.

== Hall of Silver Reliquaries ==
These consist of liturgical vestments in silver and gold, ostensories, containers for hosts and incense, pyxes, and containers with intricately designed lids featuring reliefs such as the Lamb bearing the cross; most of them originate from the Church of San Pietro in Alba Fucens, previously exhibited at the Palazzo Venezia Museum. Other artifacts include covers for missals in gold sheets, elaborately chased and set with precious stones, some adorned with historical scenes like the Crucifixion.

== Hall of Vintage Games ==
A recently arranged hall located in the vestibule of the cloister with a well; it showcases wooden and cloth games from the 20th century, alongside textbooks, primers, and alphabet books for elementary school.
