= Museo Nazionale d'Abruzzo =

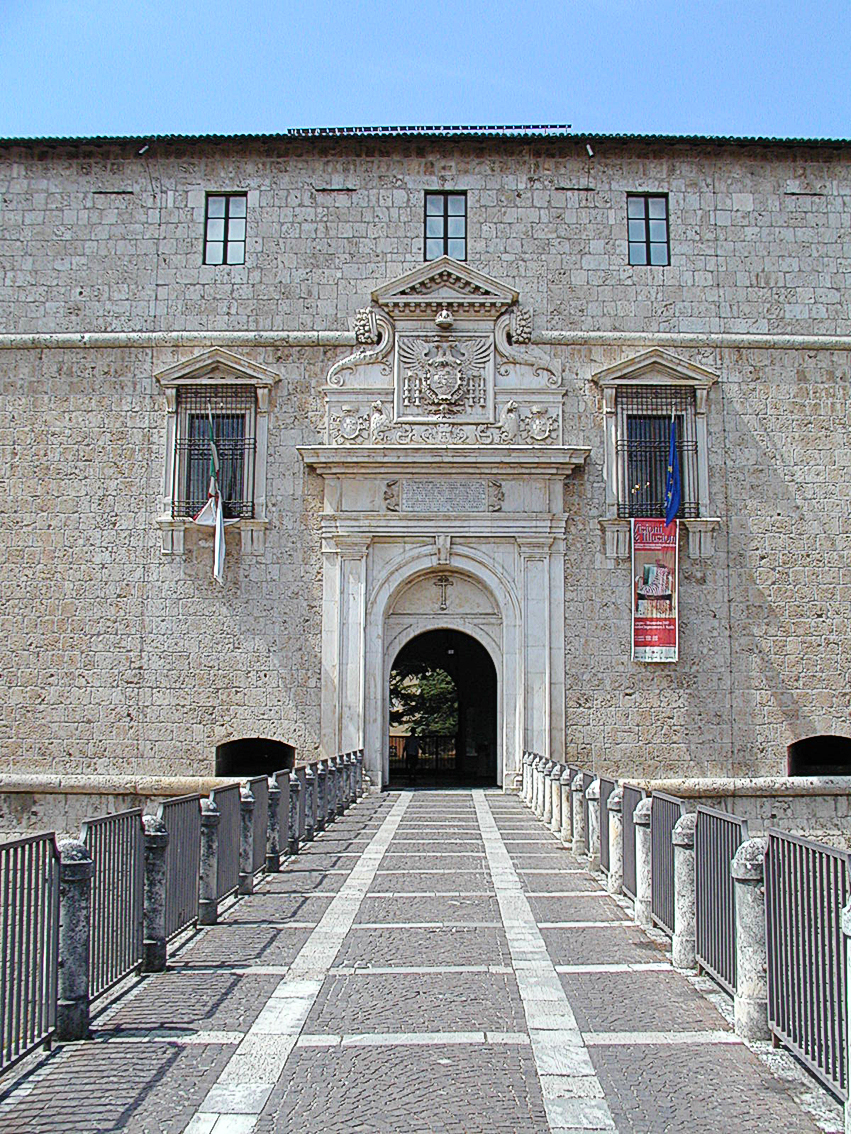
- Museo Nazionale d'Abruzzo

- Location within Abruzzo
- Location: L'Aquila
- Coordinates: 42.353689°N 13.405069°E
- Type: Art museum
- Website: http://www.munda.abruzzo.it/

The Museo Nazionale d'Abruzzo is hosted in the Forte Spagnolo of L'Aquila.

The Museum is on three floors: on the ground floor, there is the giant skeleton of an Archidiskon meridionalis (improperly called mammoth, a prehistoric "elephant") found a few miles from Aquila in 1954, and an archeological section with pieces of the Italic pre-Roman period, a section with inscriptions and pieces from the Roman towns in Abruzzo, among them a fine Roman calendar from Amiternum (25 AD).

On the first floor the medieval and modern art section, with works of Abruzzese artists of the centuries 13-17th such as: the polyptych by Jacobello del Fiore; a Processional Cross by Nicola da Guardiagrele, a group of wooden and terracotta sculptures such as a St Sebastian by Silvestro dell'Aquila and another by Saturnino Gatti; paintings by Flemish and Roman and Neapolitan artists such as Sebastiano Conca, Giulio Cesare Bedeschini, Francesco Solimena, Francesco de Mura; finally the contemporary art section with such artists as M. Vaccari, Renato Guttuso, Virgilio Guidi, Giuseppe Capogrossi, Orfeo Tamburi, and Remo Brindisi.
