= Tres Algarrobos =

- Location in Argentina
- Coordinates: 35°12′S 62°46′W
- Country: Argentina
- Province: Buenos Aires
- Partido: Carlos Tejedor
- Founded: 17 August 1901
- Elevation: 99 m (325 ft)

Population (2001 census [INDEC])
  - Total: 2,993
- CPA Base: B 6231
- Area code: +54 3388

Tres Algarrobos is a town in Buenos Aires Province, Argentina. It is located in the Carlos Tejedor Partido.

== History ==
The area was inhabited by native Argentines until the late 19th century. In the 1880s, it was expanded to include the local territory. The settlement of Tres Algarrobos was created around 1900, when 16,000 hectares of land was divided into 100 hectare plots by the Ministry of Public Works, and was officially founded on 17 August 1901.

The Buenos Aires Western Railway began passing through Tres Algarrobos in 1910.
