= Celano =

- Comune
- Comune di Celano
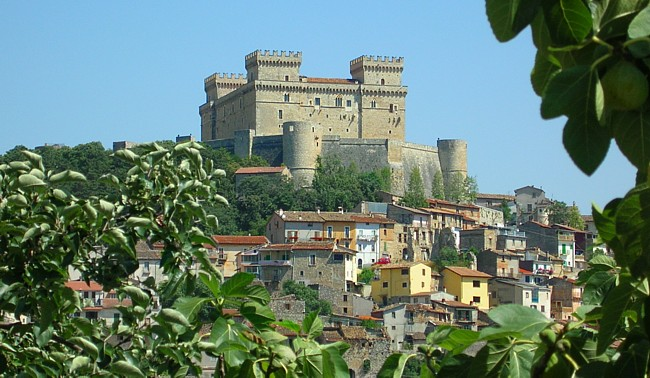
- Celano with the Piccolomini Castle.

- Coat of arms

- Location within Italy Location within Abruzzo
- Coordinates: 42°5′11″N 13°33′27″E
- Country: Italy
- Region: Abruzzo
- Province: L'Aquila (AQ)
- Frazioni: Borgo Quattordici, Borgo Ottomila

Government
  - Mayor: Settimio Santilli (Centre-right coalition)

Area
  - Total: 91 km^{2} (35 sq mi)
- Elevation: 850 m (2,790 ft)

Population (31 December 2013)
  - Total: 11,044
  - Density: 120/km^{2} (310/sq mi)
- Demonym: Celanesi
- Time zone: UTC+1 (CET)
  - Summer (DST): UTC+2 (CEST)
- Postal code: 67043
- Dialing code: 0863
- Patron saint: Simplicius, Constantius, and Victorianus
- Saint day: 26 August
- Website: Official website

Celano (Latin: Caelanum) is a town and comune in the Province of L'Aquila, central Italy, 120 km (75 mi) east of Rome by rail.

== Geography ==
Celano rises on the top of a hill in the territory of Marsica, below the mountain range of Sirente. It faces the valley of Fucino, once filled by the large Fucine Lake, which was drained during the 19th century.

== History ==
After the fall of the Western Roman Empire, Celano suffered from the invasions of Lombards (6th century). The city passed under Byzantine control, and was then subdued by the Lombards and governed by the duchies of Spoleto and Benevento.

From the 8th century, Charlemagne and his descendants ruled the Marsica region independently of Spoleto, raising it to the rank of county. Celano was elected Caput Marsorum (capital city of the Marsica region), governed by the Berardi family. From around the year 1140, it was captured by the Normans, who annexed it to the Kingdom of Sicily. Fearing that Marsica was becoming too powerful, in the year 1223, Emperor Frederick II ordered his army to destroy the castles of the region. Celano suffered a long siege, which ended with its defeat and total destruction and the exile of its entire male population to Sicily and Malta. Once the feudal rights of Celano were abolished, the region came under the jurisdiction of the Giustizierato of Abruzzo, with Sulmona as capital.

After the intercession of the Pope Honorius III, Emperor Frederick II authorised the inhabitants to return from exile. The new city was rebuilt three years after its destruction, about one kilometre from the ancient city. Celano reflourished and was once again governed by the Berardi family.

After a series of struggles between the Angevins and Aragonese, in the 15th century, the family of Berardi was dethroned by the family of the Pope Pius II of Pienza, allied to the Aragonese, who governed the city and its county. Celano was incorporated into the Kingdom of Naples till 1860, except during the years associated with the Napoleonic era and the Parthenopean Republic. In the year 1591, the Piccolomini family sold the County of Celano to Camilla Peretti, sister of Pope Sixtus V. The city was at times also governed by the Savelli and Sforza families and was damaged by earthquakes in the years 1695, 1780, 1915 and 2009.

From the year 1860, Celano belonged to the Kingdom of Italy.

== Main sites ==
The square Piccolomini Castle, with round towers at the corners, was erected in its present form on the top of the San Vittorino Hill. Its construction was commissioned by Count Pietro Berardi around the year 1392, and was finished around 1451. In 1463, it was adapted on the orders of Antonio Piccolomini. On 13 January 1915, the castle was seriously damaged by a terrible earthquake that destroyed many villages in the area. The restoration began 25 years later, in 1940, but was interrupted because of the Second World War and was resumed only in 1955, with completion in 1960. Today, the castle hosts the Museum of Sacred Art of the Marsica. The beautiful castle is easily recognisable when driving on the highway A25 between Rome and Pescara.

Celano is home to three churches with 13th-century façades, in the style of those of L'Aquila.

== Culture and sport ==
Celano F.C. Marsica plays in Serie D Group F in the 2012/2013 football season.

Celano's sister city is Żejtun in Malta.

== Notable people ==
Celano is the birthplace of the Blessed Thomas of Celano, born between the years 1185 and 1190, and a follower of St. Francis of Assisi, and of the classical pianist Nazzareno Carusi.

== See also ==
- Museo Paludi di Celano
