= Simplicius, Constantius and Victorinus =

2nd-century Christian martyrs and Catholic saints

Saints Simplicius, Constantius and Victorinus

Martyrs
- Born: Bourgogne, Gaul
- Died: ~159 AD; Celano, Italy
- Venerated in: Catholic Church
- Feast: 26 August
- Patronage: Celano

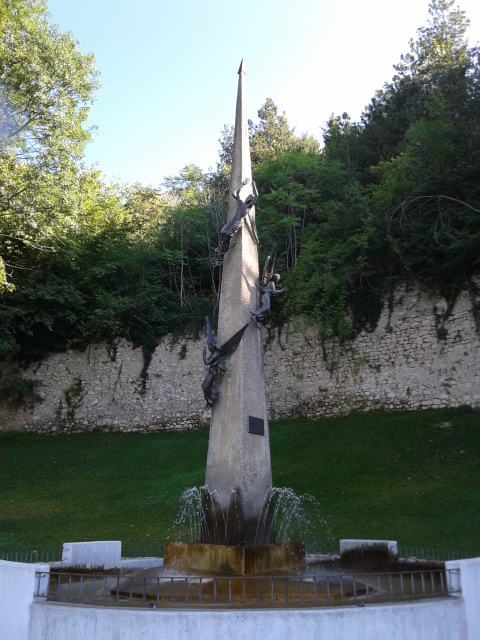
Monument to the Holy Martyrs Simplicio, Costanzo and Vittoriano

Simplicius, Constantius and Victorinus (Victorian(us)) (Italian: Simplicio, Costanzo e Vittoriano) are venerated as Christian martyrs of the 2nd century. Simplicius, was, according to tradition, a Christian of the Abruzzi region who was executed along with his two sons, Constantius and Victorian, during the reign of Marcus Aurelius. Their Passio contains all of the tropes of the genre. It is believed that the martyrdoms are genuine but that the three martyrs were not necessarily related to one another, but were executed together at Marsica.

The earliest source on their lives dates from a Passio of 1406. The Passio states that Simplicius and his entire family, natives of Bourgogne, were baptized by Saint Januarius (not, according to Antonio Borrelli, the famous saint of Naples) during the reign of Antoninus Pius (138-161). Gaudentia, the wife of Simplicius, became a nun and withdrew to a monastery. At the same time, Simplicius and his two sons Constantius and Victorinus preached on behalf of their new religion. Pontius, the prefect in Gaul, was ordered to arrest all Christians; Simplicius and his two sons were arrested and led in front of the court, where they preached the Trinity and the Absolution. They were flogged and sent to Rome to be condemned to death.

According to the legend, during the journey, the saints cured a child of blindness. At Rome, they wished to visit the tombs of Saints Peter and Paul, but the guards prohibited this. However, God liberated them from their chains, allowing them to make the pilgrimage to the tombs with a group of Christians. The pilgrimage resulted in a fight erupting between the Christians and pagans; the pagans suffered many losses. The three saints were once again arrested and brought to Antoninus Pius at Marsica.

In the emperor's presence, the three saints refused to abjure their faith. They were tossed into a chamber filled with snakes and scorpions, but they emerged unharmed due to the intercession of an angel. They were then condemned to be torn apart by four maddened heifers, but these beasts refused to move. Finally, on 26 August 159, they were beheaded at Celano, at a spot called Aureum fontem ("Golden Springs"), identified by the writer of the Passio as the future site of the church of San Giovanni Vecchio in Celano, with the spring eventually becoming known as S. Ioannis in capite acquae.

After the death of the three saints, an earthquake shook the town, and one of the executioners was converted to Christianity, with the deacon named Florentius, a witness to the event, writing down and passing down the news of their deaths.

== Veneration ==
Evidence of their cult in the Marsica region can be found as early as the 11th century, when Bishop Pandolphus (Pandolfo) received a letter from Pope Stephen IX in 1057, which recognized the authenticity of the relics of the three martyrs, which were found underneath the principal altar of San Giovanni Vecchio, anciently the Collegiata di Celano. Frederick II destroyed the city in 1222, exiling all of its male inhabitants to Malta and Sicily. When the city was rebuilt on the Hill of San Vittorino, the relics were translated to the chapel of the new church there, on June 10, 1406, which occasioned the writing of the aforementioned Passio.

Their names were inserted into the Roman Martyrology, in 1630, under 26 August.
