= Basilica of San Bernardino =

Church in L'Aquila, Abruzzo, Italy

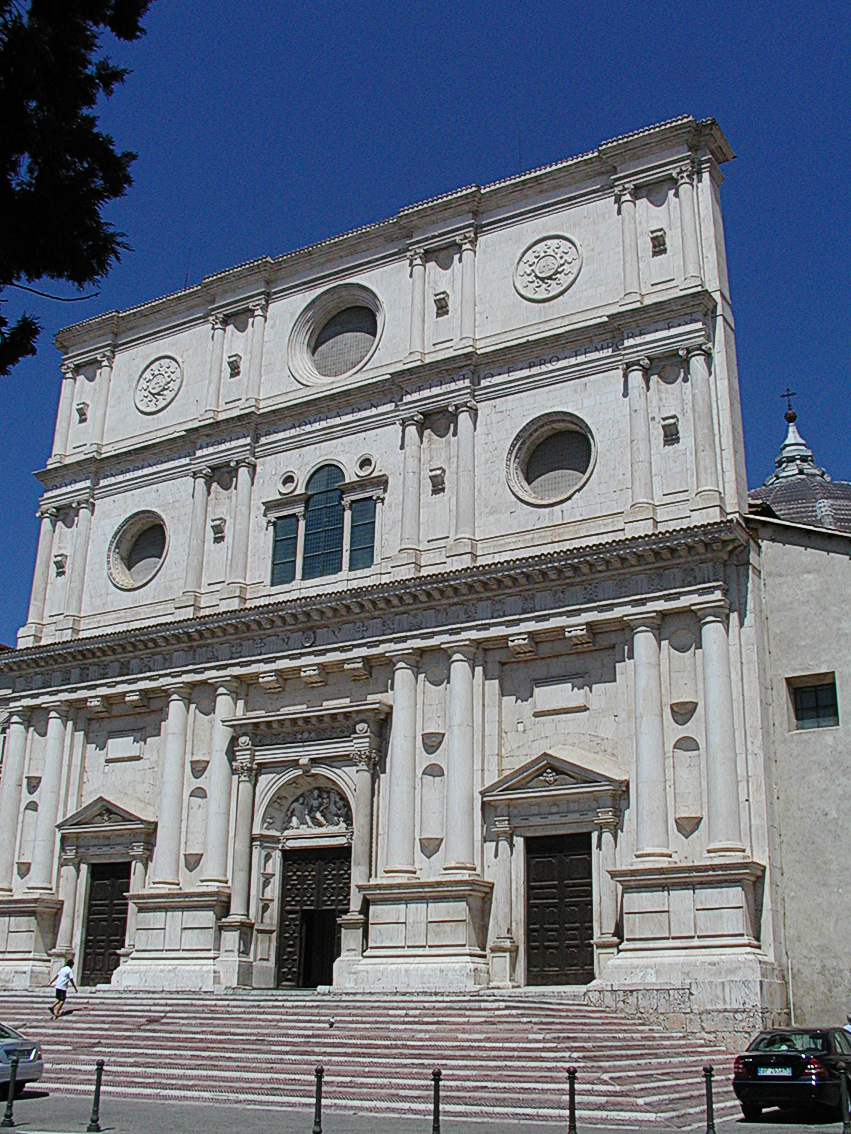
- Basilica di San Bernardino

Religion
- Affiliation: Roman Catholic Church
- Province: Archdiocese of L'Aquila
- Region: Abruzzo
- Rite: Roman Rite

Location
- Location: L'Aquila
- State: Italy
- Interactive map of Basilica of San Bernardino
- Coordinates: 42.3510°N 13.4031°E

Architecture
- Architect: Nicola Filotesio
- Type: Church
- Style: Renaissance, Baroque
- Groundbreaking: 1454
- Completed: 1472

The Basilica of San Bernardino is a religious building located in L'Aquila, Italy. The church was built, with the adjacent cloister, between 1454 and 1472 in honour of St Bernardino of Siena. The facade was built by Silvestro dall'Aquila and later passed to Cola dell'Amatrice, reaching completion in 1542. It is a notable example of 16th century architecture combining Greek, Latin and Christian influences, divided into three orders, consisting of Doric, Ionic and Corinthian styles. The corpse of the saint is kept inside the church in a mausoleum built by Silvestro dell'Aquila.

In 1902, the basilica was declared a national monumental building, and in 1946, Pope Pius XII elevated it to the rank of minor basilica. Due to the 2009 earthquake in the region, the apse and campanile were significantly damaged. Repairs and consolidation works were carried out and the basilica was eventually reopened to the community in 2015.

== History ==
Bernardino degli Albizzeschi was born in Massa Marittima in 1380. At a young age he moved to Siena, where he stayed for most of his life and began his activity as a preacher. In 1437, at the height of his fame and after repeatedly declining the office of bishop, he became vicar general of the Franciscan order in Italy. Following his appointment to vicar general, Bernardino was invited by Bishop Amico Agnifili to Abruzzo in an attempt to reconcile two adversarial groups. Although seriously sick, in 1444 he travelled to Aquila. He then died there on May 20th.

Following his death, the citizens reconciled and attained authorisation from Pope Eugene IV to keep the corpse of the saint. Pope Nicholas V canonised St Bernardino of Siena six years after his death, and shortly after the citizens of Aquila erected the Basilica in honour of his life with the help of his disciples, John of Capestrano and James of the Marches.

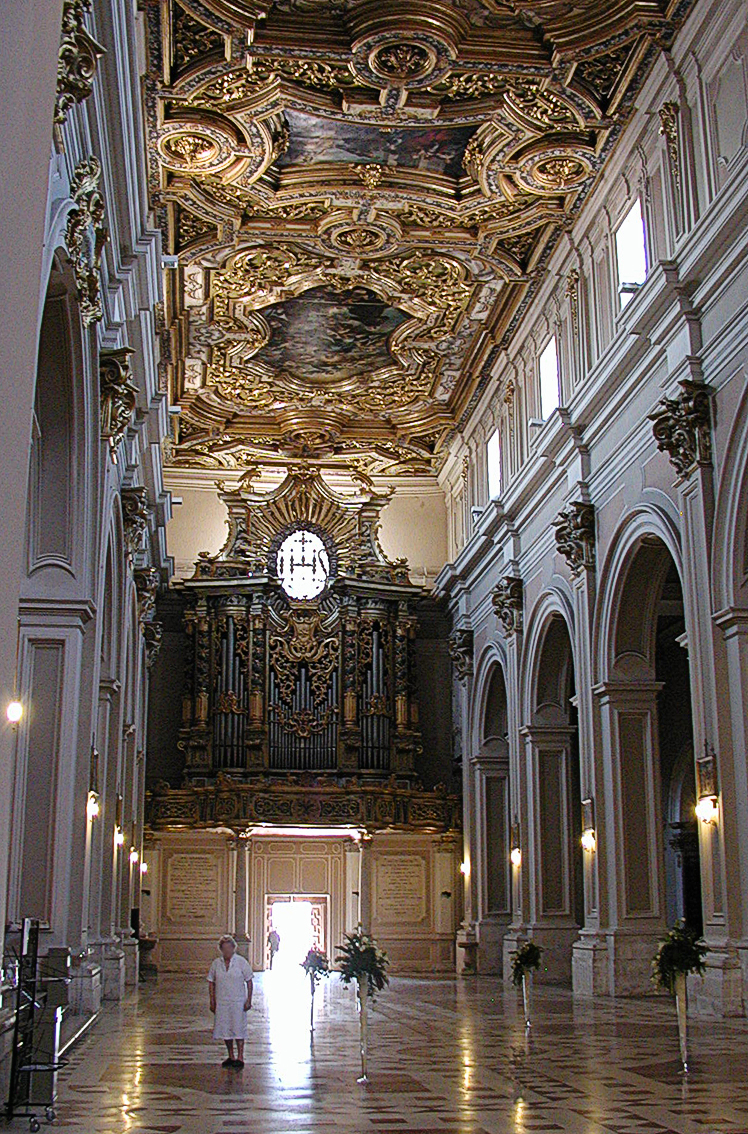
Inside partial view

In 1454, ten years after the saint's death, the first period of works began. The site chosen was situated between the San Salvatore hospital and the now defunct church of Sant'Alò, to the east of the junction of Via Roma with the Corso Vittorio Emanuele in the heart of the town, close to the eastern walls of the Santa Maria quarter. The works were frequently interrupted by various natural phenomena including the earthquake of 1461, which caused some damage to the building and stalled proceedings until 1464. In 1471 the structure was consecrated, though elements of the dome and mausoleum remained uncompleted until 1489 and 1505 respectively. The work on this portion of the Basilica was concluded in 1472 with the erection of the cupola, which allowed the relocation of the saint's corpse to the inside of the dedicated chapel. In this first phase, the church had a brick facade, equipped with a portico built between 1465 and 1468, designed by James of the Marches.

Just later began the building of the facade under the direction of Silvestro dall'Aquila. When he died in 1504, the works stopped and the facade remained incomplete for over twenty years. In 1524, the job was taken over by Nicola Filotesio, better known as Cola dell'Amatrice, and the church was completed in 1542.

After the earthquake in 1703, the inside of the church was completely rebuilt in the Baroque style by three great architects of that period: Sebastiano Cipriani, Giovanni Battisti Contini and Filippo Biarigioni. In 1724 Ferdinando Mosca made the magnificent wooden ceiling which was painted by Girolamo Cenatiempo, who was also the painter of frescos in the chapel hosting the saint's mausoleum. In 1773 Donato Rocco completed the main altar.

In April 2009, another violent earthquake hit L'Aquila, which damaged the apse of the cathedral and destroyed part of the bell tower and the cupola. The longitudinal walls and adjacent cloister were also subjected to problems.

The day of the earthquake, the president of the Monte dei Paschi Siena group, Giuseppe Mussari, guaranteed a loan of a considerable amount to permit the restoration work of the basilica. The cost was evaluated at over 40 million euro and the work was estimated to last more than ten years.

In May 2015 the church reopened to the community after six years of work, restoring the cupola and the bell tower damaged by the earthquake of 2009.

== Description ==
Along with the basilica of Santa Maria di Collemaggio, Saint Bernardino was the first city monument to gain interest from outside of the Abruzzo surroundings, and eventually gained national and international recognition. The interest is mainly brought by the fame of the tuscan saint, but also because of the famous historical figures of the catholic church involved in its construction, such as the two popes Nicolas V and Julius II.

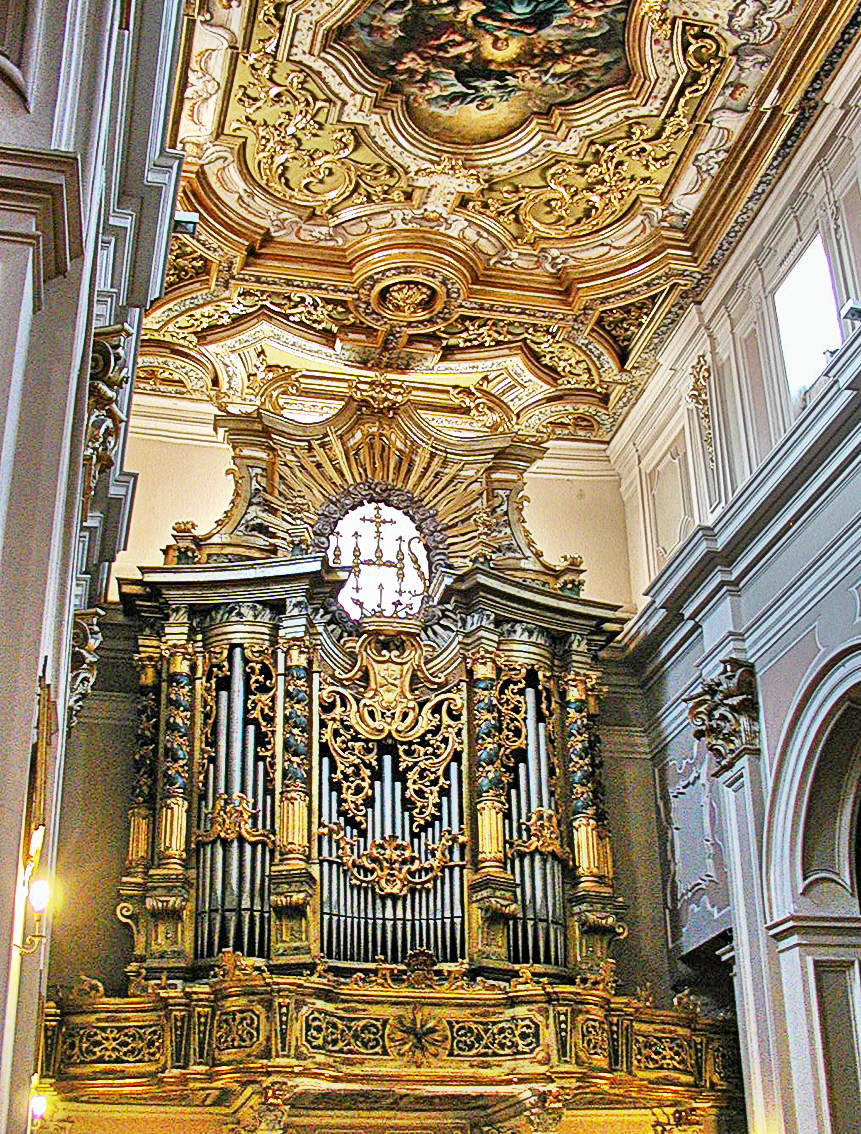
Monumental pipe organ

=== The facade ===
The facade is made of stone and was built by Cola dell'Amatrice between 1524 and 1542. In some researchers' opinion, the facade was inspired by Michelangelo's work for the Basilica of San Lorenzo in Florence. It is subdivided in three different architectural orders: the first in the doric order, the second in the ionic and the third in the corinthian. On the columns and beams of the first order there are illustrated metopes, on the second order there is a refined triple lancet window, which was added during the restoration work in the 18th century, and on the third order there are three big oculuses. Four sequences of double columns vertically divide the church, establishing a suggestive and harmonic diagram of nine squares on three lines. The principal gate is embedded by spiral columns. The lunette includes Silvestro dell'Aquila's high relief illustrating a scene of Madonna with child between Francesco d'Assisi and Bernardino da Siena.

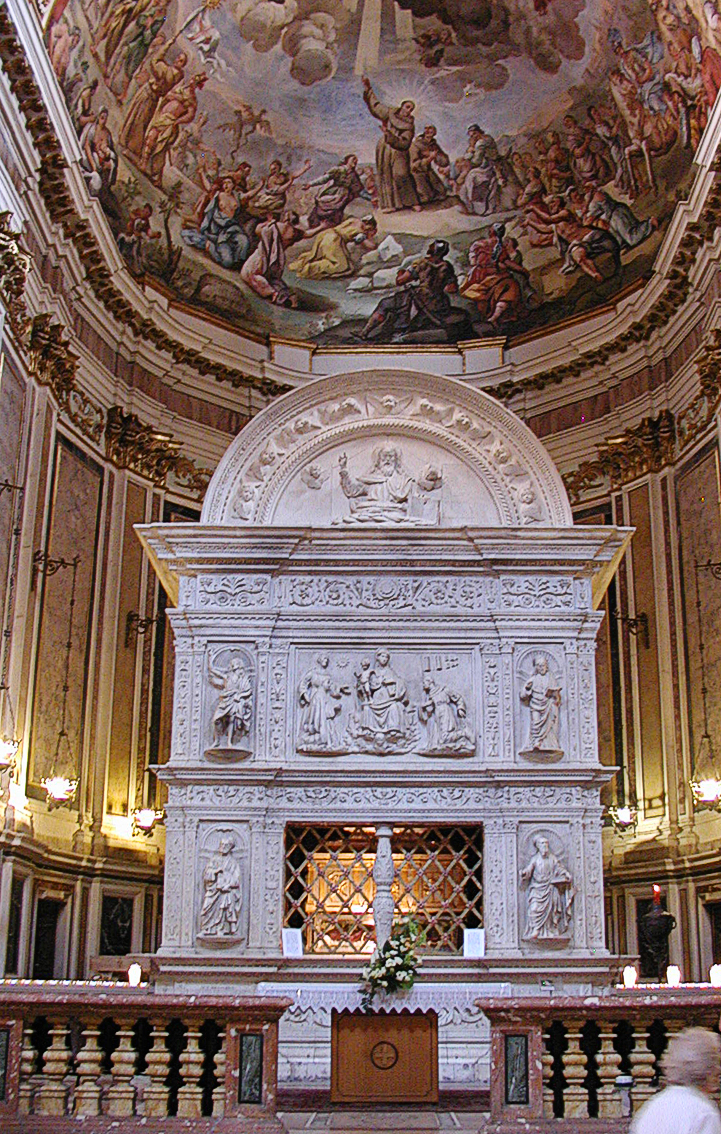
Saint Bernardine's mausoleum

=== Inside ===
The layout of the inside is a Latin cross with three naves about 26 feet long. The aspect is sumptuously baroque due to restoration work following the 1703 earthquake.

Today the central nave has an exquisite wooden lacunar ceiling carving, painting and gilding by Ferdinando Mosca da Pescocostanzo (1723-1727), who also made the magnificent pipe organ. The ceiling was later painted by Girolamo Cenatiempo, pupil of Luca Giordano. The lateral naves include chapels formed in octagonal cupolas.

The last chapel to the left contains the Mausoleum Camponeschi, made by Silvestro dell'Aquila. The second from the right has an altarpiece in terracotta white-glazed on blue bottom, by Andrea della Robbia. On the fourth chapel to the right there is the painting Adorazione dei Magi, a work by Pompeo Cesura, pupil of Raffaello.

The fifth chapel to the right is much bigger than the others, and features the Mausoleum of St. Bernardino. The commission was given to Silvestro dell'Aquila in 1489 by Jacopo di Notar Nanni and it was completed by his grandchild Angelo, better known as L'Ariscola, in 1505. The mausoleum in considered the masterpiece of Renaissance art in L'Aquila. It has a quadrilateral form with two rows of pilasters decorated with reliefs of sacred images. The remains of the saint are held in a modern silver urn which substitutes the original one stolen by the French. The vault of the chapel and the apse contain frescos made by Cenatiempo.

== Images ==
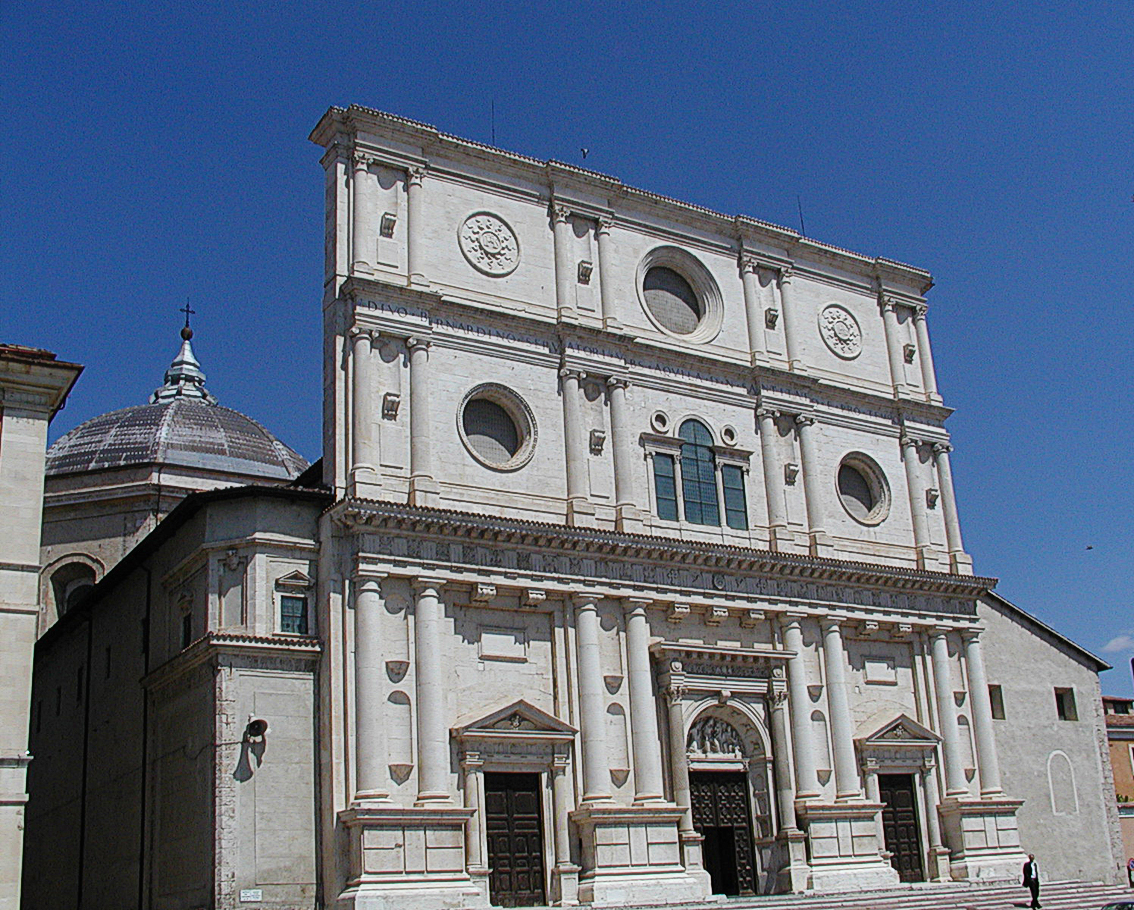
The basilica exterior

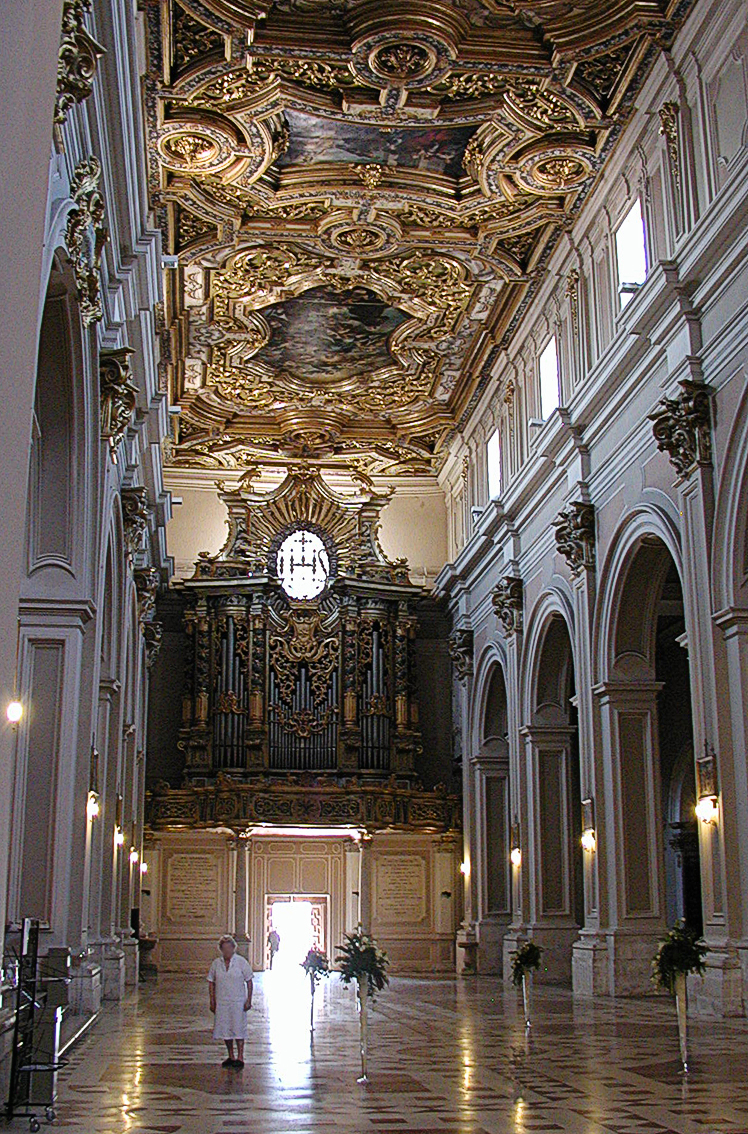
View along the interior

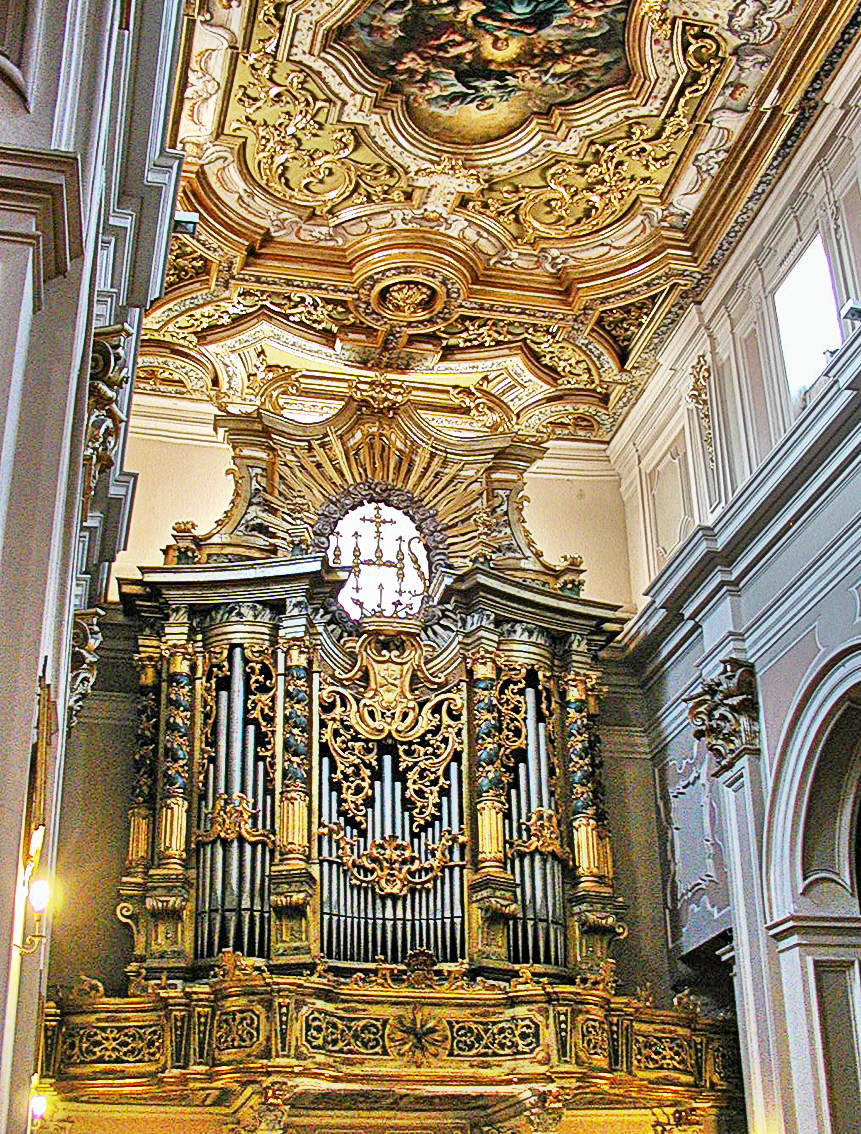
The monumental organ

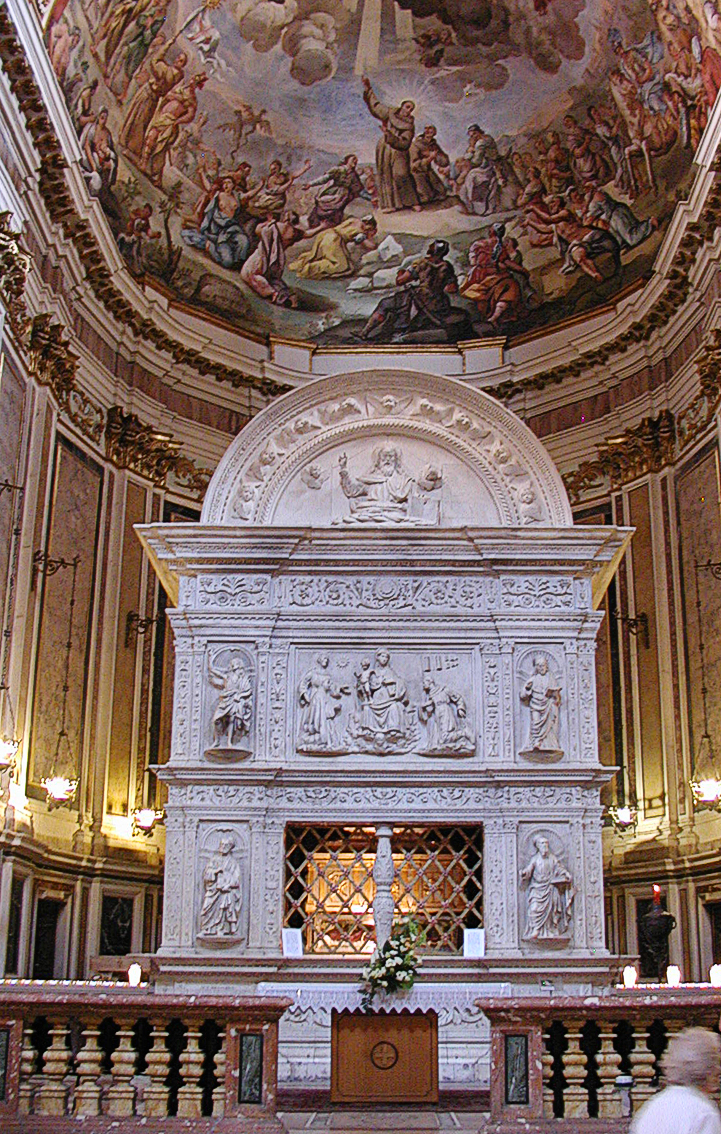
The mausoleum of Saint Bernardine of Siena

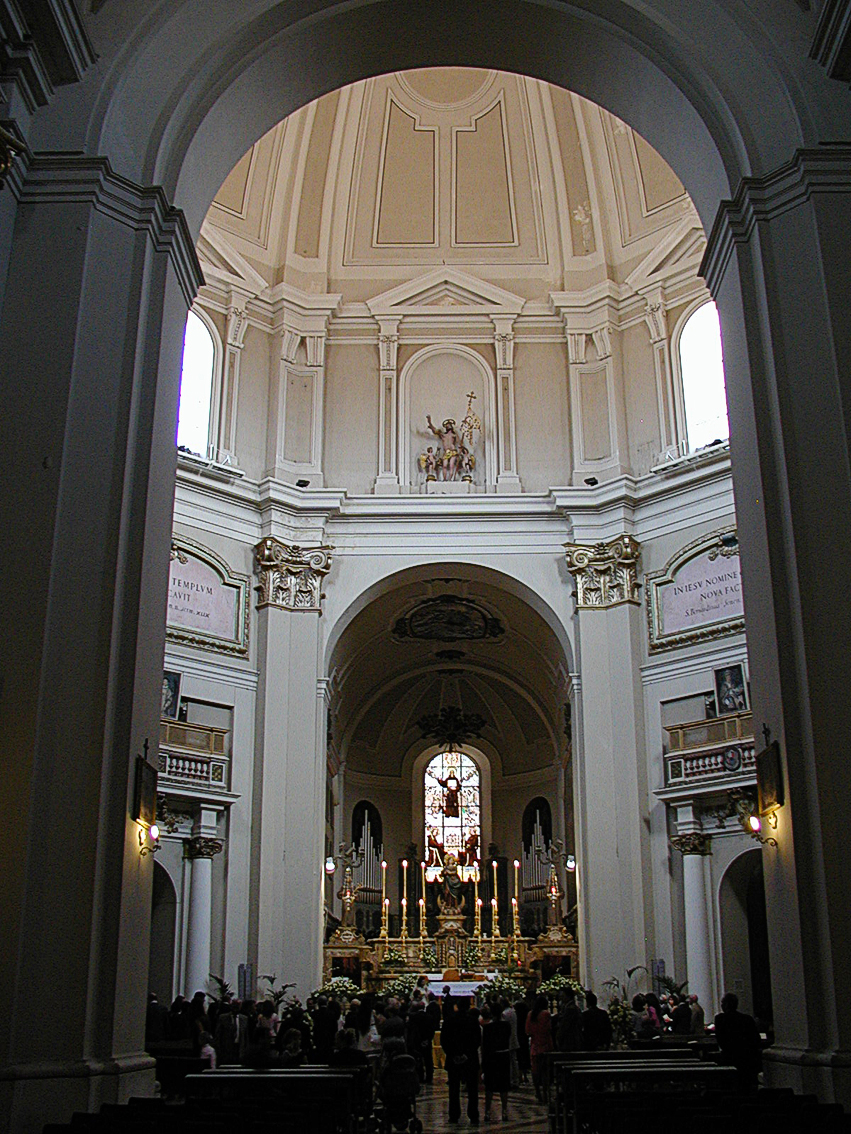
Interior of the cupola

== Bibliography ==
- Touring Club Italiano - La Biblioteca di Repubblica (2005). L'Italia - Abruzzo e Molise. Touring Editore.
- Touring Club Italiano (2005). Abruzzo: L'Aquila e il Gran Sasso, Chieti, Pescara, Teramo, i parchi e la costa adriatica. Touring Editore.
