= Colonia Seré =

- Town
- Location within Buenos Aires Province
- Coordinates: 35°26′S 62°42′W
- Country: Argentina
- Province: Buenos Aires
- Partidos: Carlos Tejedor
- Established: 1903
- Elevation: 91 m (299 ft)

Population (2001 Census)
  - Total: 641
- Time zone: UTC−3 (ART)
- CPA Base: B 6459
- Climate: Dfc

Colonia Seré is a town located in the Carlos Tejedor Partido in the province of Buenos Aires, Argentina.

== Geography ==
Colonia Seré is located around 460 km (290 mi) from the city of Buenos Aires.

== Population ==
According to INDEC, which collects population data for the country, the town had a population of 641 people as of the 2001 census.
