= Forte Spagnolo, L'Aquila =

Forte Spagnolo
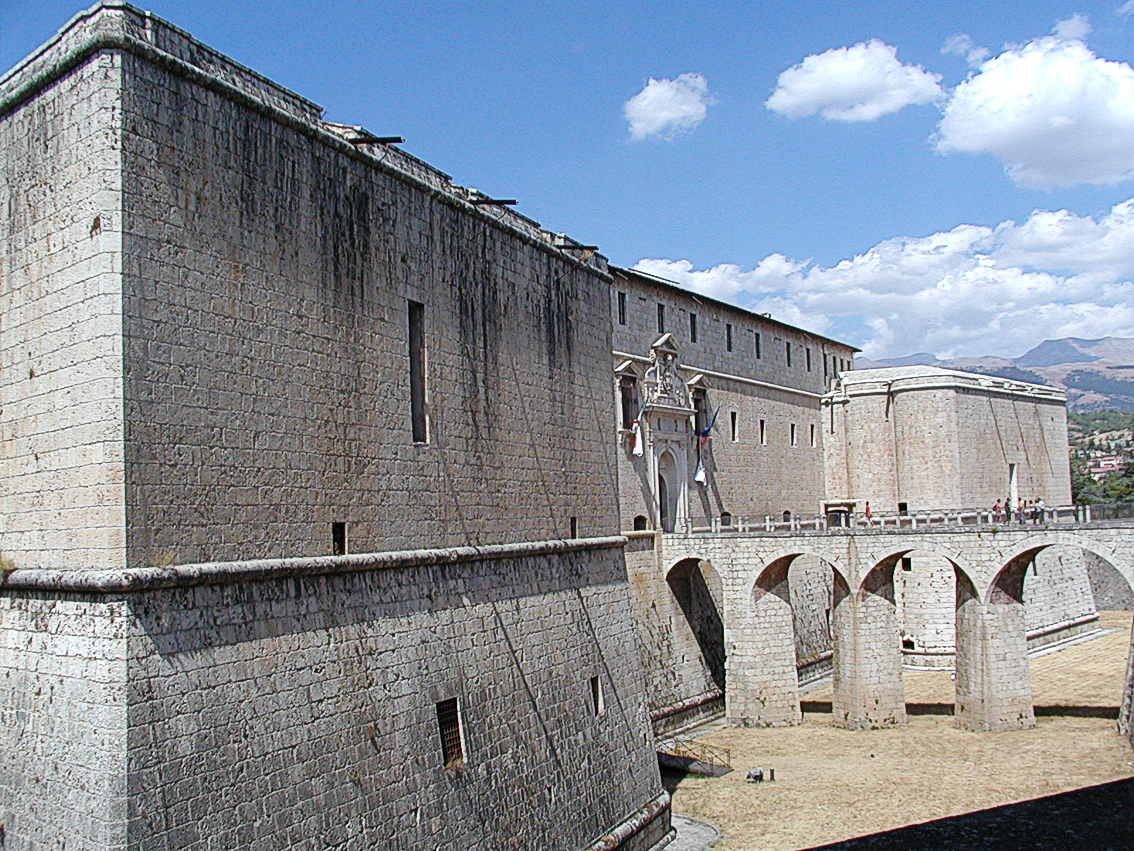
- Forte Spagnolo

Site information
- Type: Fortress

Location
- Coordinates: 42.352858°N 13.405014°E

Site history
- Built: 16th century
- Materials: stone

The Forte Spagnolo (Italian for Spanish fortress; locally called il Castello) is a Renaissance castle in L'Aquila, central Italy.

== History ==
In the 15th century, L'Aquila had become the second most powerful city in the Kingdom of Naples after Naples itself: there were half a million sheep, wool and saffron were exported throughout Europe; all this was lost when the Aquilans, during the war between the French and the Spaniards for the throne of Naples, sided with the French. In 1504 Aquila was occupied by the Spanish conquerors, though in 1527 the French recovered the city with the support of the citizens and the surrounding town. One year later Viceroy Philibert of Orange, ruling for King Charles V of Spain, finally defeated the Aquilan rebels and ordered the city to build a fortress in the highest spot North of the city, exactly where in 1401 King Ladislaus had built a garrison to control the unruly and rebellious Aquilans.

The project was entrusted to a Spanish architect, Pedro Luis Escrivà, an expert of firearms, who had begun to build Castel Sant'Elmo in Naples. The discovery of gunpowder obliged to new methods of defensive construction. Escrivà was in charge of the project for 2 years, leaving the task to Gian Girolamo Escribà.

In the following 30 years the heavy taxes necessary to build the fortress impoverished the city, which in 1567 begged the Spaniards to stop the construction; the Royal Court granted the request, and works were interrupted, so parts of the castle were never completed. The fortress had cost an enormous sum for the times, and Aquila was obliged also to sell the thick silver case containing the body of St. Bernardino of Siena.

The fortress, which had been built not to defend the city, but to control it (its cannons pointed to the city) and to be a completely self-sufficient structure, was never used in a battle.

== Architecture ==
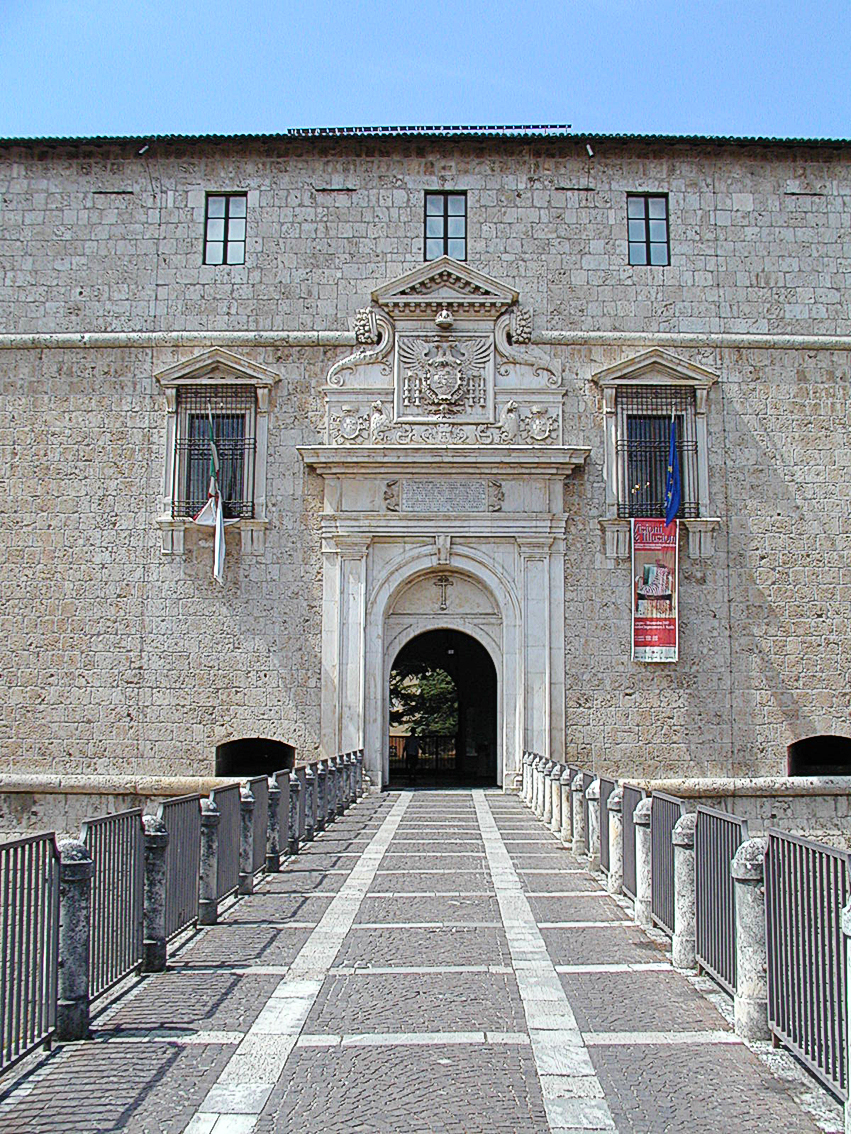
Gate.

Escrivà planned a giant fortress, made of four bastions connected through 60 meters long walls, with a thickness of 30 metres at the bottom and 5 meters at top. The walls were surmounted by massive merlons, with openings for the archers and the long-distance cannons. All around the fortress was a ditch (never filled with water) 23 meters wide and 14 meters deep, aimed at defending the foundations from the enemy's artillery.

The slanted walls would reject enemy fire to the sides; each bastion consisted of two separate and completely self-sufficient environments - called "case matte" - almost independent garrisons on their own. Also the aqueduct to the city was deviated so as to supply the fortress first of all, and in case of rebellion block the water supply.

Moreover, Escrivà planned a special anti-mine corridor, a kind of empty space between the outer and inner walls which could be walked only by one man at a time (and which can be visited today), aiming at defending the castle in case of explosion in case enemy soldiers excavated tunnels to leave mines at the foundations. A whole hill was leveled down to supply the white stone necessary for the fortress, while the city's bells were melted to make the cannons.

In 1798 the citizens fought against the French who had invaded Italy, attacking, in vain, the fortress. From then on, the building was used as a prison. After 1860 it became a military headquarters, and in the Second World War was occupied and damaged by the Germans. Between 1949 and 1951 the castle was restored, and chosen as the seat of the Museo Nazionale d'Abruzzo.
