= Museo Paludi di Celano =

Coordinates: 42.0527°N 13.5145°E

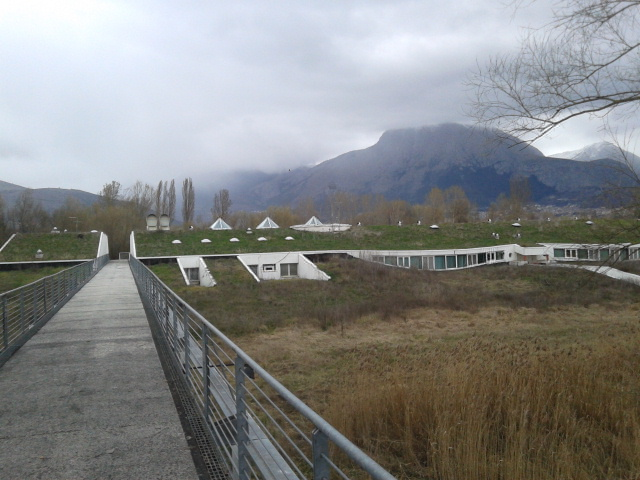
- Museo Paludi di Celano

- Location within Abruzzo
- Location: Celano
- Type: Archaeology museum

Museo Paludi di Celano (Italian for Swamps of Celano Museum) is an archaeology museum in Celano, Province of L'Aquila (Abruzzo). Since December 2014, the Ministry of Culture has managed it through the Abruzzo Museum Pole, which became the Regional Directorate of Museums in December 2019.

== History ==
The museum structure was built a few years after the discovery of the pile-dwelling settlement of Celano-Paludi, which came to light beginning in 1984. That year, excavation operations started in the area, initially revealing a rich presence of wooden and ceramic materials. Subsequently, thanks to studies and further archaeological excavations, a pile-dwelling village was uncovered on the shores of Fucino, with evidence of its settlement dating back between 3600 and 3700 years ago, while its major expansion dates back to the 12th century BC.

== Collection ==
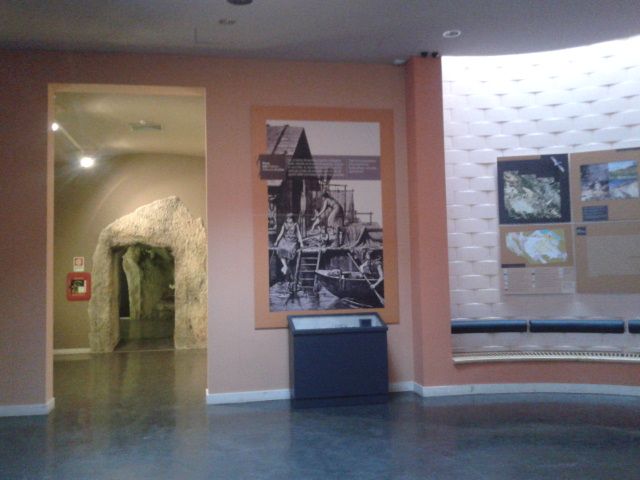
Interior of the museum

These are artifacts ranging from the Bronze Age to the Roman era. The museum building's design, largely underground, is by architects Ettore De Lellis and Pierluigi Natalucci. The structure's uniqueness lies in its shape, reminiscent of the mound tombs of the protohistoric era, of which the Marsica territory is rich in evidence. The museum, for several years dedicated exclusively to prehistoric artifacts, now also hosts spaces for temporary exhibitions, a conference room, large restoration laboratories, and anthropological spaces illustrating the history of the Marsica from the first human settlements in caves and pile-dwelling villages. In some storerooms, artworks from Abruzzo municipalities in the seismic crater area that were damaged by the 2009 L'Aquila earthquake are preserved.

The museum, one of the largest in central Italy, covers an area of 5000 square meters and is adjacent to an artificial marsh, partly used to recreate scenes from the pile-dwelling village. In one of the artificial lakes, there are several remains of large oak poles and the necropolis, which alone has yielded six tumulus burials. A walkway allows visitors to observe the external environments of the museum from above.

Internally, the rooms are structured as follows:

Exhibition space, where temporary exhibitions of archaeological finds are hosted. Multimedia section, illustrating the climatic and anthropological changes in the area. Permanent exhibition, presenting artifacts from across the regional territory, dating from the Paleolithic to the 1st century BC. Anthropology laboratory. Restoration laboratory. Conference room.
