= Curarú =

- Town
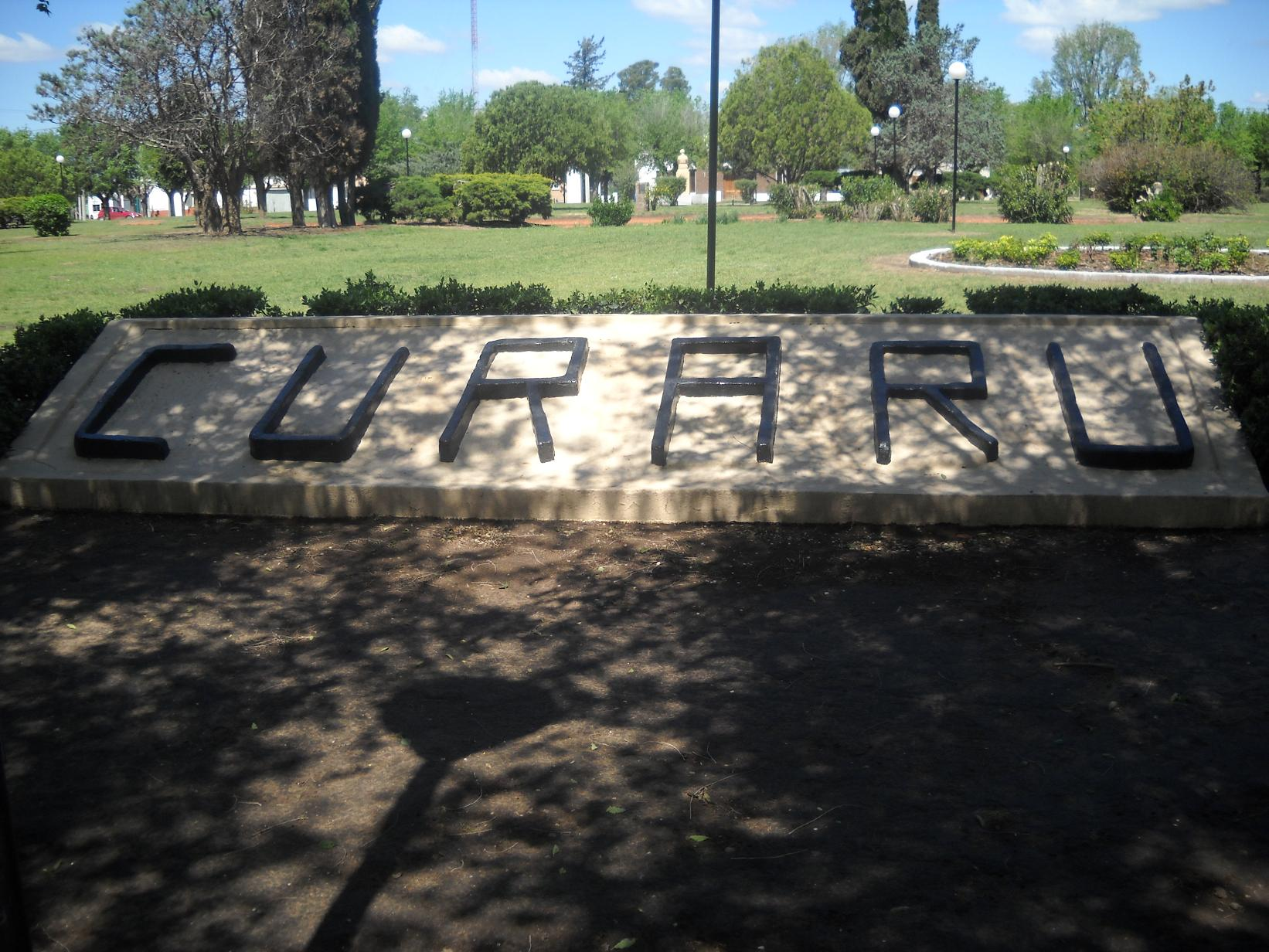

- Location within Buenos Aires Province
- Coordinates: 35°38′S 62°13′W
- Country: Argentina
- Province: Buenos Aires
- Partidos: Carlos Tejedor
- Established: March 10, 1910
- Elevation: 84 m (276 ft)

Population (2001 Census)
  - Total: 448
- Time zone: UTC−3 (ART)
- CPA Base: B 6451
- Climate: Dfc

Curarú is a town located in the southern portion of the Carlos Tejedor Partido in the province of Buenos Aires, Argentina.

== Geography ==
The town sits around 1,000 m (3,300 ft) from a lagoon of the same name, which, in recent years has begun to dry up due to droughts.

== Population ==
According to INDEC, which collects population data for the country, the town had a population of 448 people as of the 2001 census.
