= Gustavo Gatti =

Argentine footballer

Personal information
- Full name: Héctor Gustavo Gatti
- Date of birth: 25 January 1972 (age 54)
- Place of birth: Mar del Plata, Argentina
- Height: 1.78 m (5 ft 10 in)
- Position: Goalkeeper

Senior career*
Years	Team	Apps	(Gls)
1992–1997	Huachipato		
1998	Liverpool Montevideo		
1999	Morelia		
2000	Rangers		
2001–2002	Provincial Osorno		
2002–2003	Huachipato		
2004–2005	Banfield de Mar del Plata		
2005–2006	Aldosivi		
2006–2007	Deportivo Santamarina		
2007–2009	Alvarado de Mar del Plata		
2010–2011	Talleres de Mar del Plata		
- * Club domestic league appearances and goals

Héctor Gustavo Gatti (born 25 January 1972) is an Argentine former professional footballer who played as a goalkeeper for clubs of Argentina, Chile, Mexico and Uruguay.

== Career ==
- Huachipato 1992–1997
- Liverpool 1998
- Morelia 1999
- Rangers 2000
- Provincial Osorno 2001–2002
- Huachipato 2002–2003
- Banfield de Mar del Plata 2004–2005
- Aldosivi 2005–2006
- Deportivo Santamarina 2006–2007
- Alvarado de Mar del Plata 2007–2009
- Talleres de Mar del Plata 2010–2011
