= Lou Gatti =

Australian rules footballer, born 1915

Personal information
- Full name: Louis John Gatti
- Born: 7 March 1915; Chiltern, Victoria
- Died: 16 May 1977 (aged 62); Port Melbourne, Victoria
- Original team: Chiltern Valley
- Height: 168 cm (5 ft 6 in)
- Weight: 70 kg (154 lb)

Playing career^{1}
Years	Club	Games (Goals)
1935	South Melbourne	4 (1)
1936–37	St Kilda	5 (3)
Total		9 (4)
- ^{1} Playing statistics correct to the end of 1937.

Louis John Gatti (7 March 1915 – 16 May 1977) was an Australian rules footballer who played with South Melbourne and St Kilda in the Victorian Football League (VFL).

== Family ==
The son of Luigi Gatti (1871–1961), and Caroline Gatti (−1944), née de Carle, Louis John Gatti was born in Chiltern, Victoria on 7 March 1915.

He married Muriel Alva Nellie Ball, at St Silas Church, Albert Park, on 29 November 1941.

== Death ==
He died in Port Melbourne, Victoria on 16 May 1977.

== Sources ==
- Holmesby, Russell; Main, Jim (2014). The Encyclopedia of AFL Footballers: every AFL/VFL player since 1897 (10th ed.). Seaford, Victoria: BAS Publishing. ISBN 978-1-921496-32-5.
