= Carlos Tejedor Partido =

Carlos Tejedor Partido de Carlos Tejedor
- Department
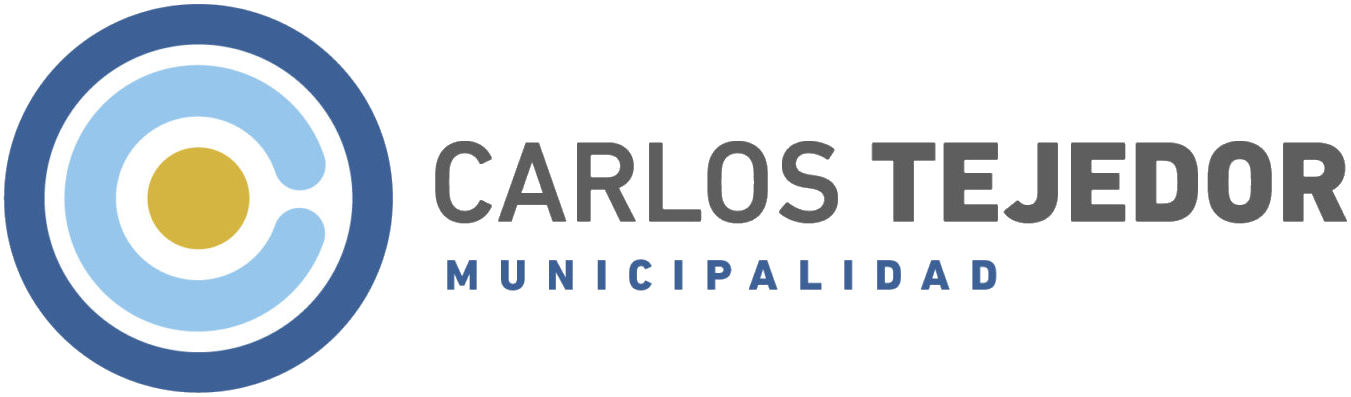

- Location of Carlos Tejedor Partido in Buenos Aires Province
- Coordinates: 35°22′S 62°55′W
- Country: Argentina
- Established: June 28, 1877
- Founder: provincial law
- Seat: Carlos Tejedor

Government
  - Intendant: María Celia Gianini (PJ)

Area
  - Total: 3,933 km^{2} (1,519 sq mi)

Population
  - Total: 11,539
  - Density: 2.934/km^{2} (7.599/sq mi)
- Demonym: Tejedorense
- Postal Code: B6455
- IFAM: BUE021
- Area Code: 02357
- Patron saint: San Juan Crisóstomo
- Website: carlostejedor.gob.ar

Carlos Tejedor Partido is a partido in the north-west of Buenos Aires Province in Argentina.

The provincial subdivision has a population of about 11,500 inhabitants in an area of 3,933 km^{2} (1,519 sq mi), and its capital city is Carlos Tejedor.

== Settlements ==
- Carlos Tejedor
- Colonia Seré
- Curarú
- Timote
- Tres Algarrobos
