= Hospital Pirovano =

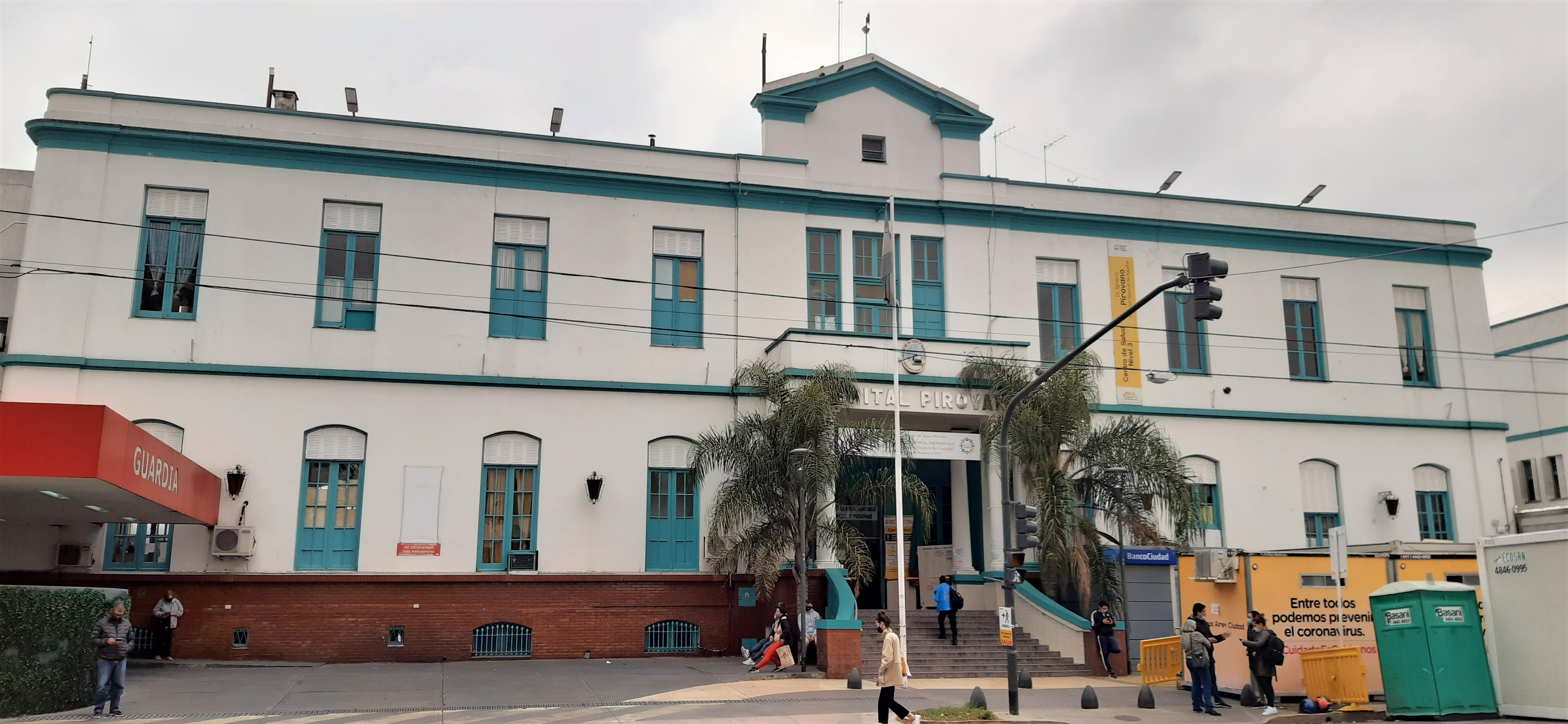
- Entrance of the Hospital

Geography
- Location: Buenos Aires, Argentina
- Coordinates: 34°33′54″S 58°28′16″W

Organisation
- Type: General

History
- Opened: July 12, 1896

Links
- Lists: Hospitals in Argentina

Hospital Pirovano is a hospital in Buenos Aires, Argentina.
