= Lucas Gatti =

Argentine footballer

Personal information
- Full name: Lucas Cassius Gatti
- Date of birth: 14 February 1978 (age 48)
- Place of birth: Buenos Aires, Argentina
- Position: Midfielder

Senior career*
Years	Team	Apps	(Gls)
1995–1996	Argentinos Juniors	2	(0)
1997–1998	Boca Juniors	0	(0)
2001–2002	Dundee	4	(0)
2003–2004	CD Badajoz		
2004–2005	CD Don Benito		

Managerial career
- 2022-2024: Bromley U23
- 2024: Olbia
- * Club domestic league appearances and goals

Lucas Cassius Gatti (born 14 February 1978) is an Argentine football coach and former player.

== Career ==
Gatti played as a midfielder for Argentinos Juniors, Dundee and CD Badajoz.

Gatti was appointed the U23 manager at Bromley in July 2022, having first joined the English side's coaching set up in February of the same year.

On 9 October 2024, Italian Serie D club Olbia announced the hiring of Gatti as their new head coach, replacing Marco Amelia. He resigned just a month later, on 9 November, due to personal reasons.

== Personal life ==
He is the son of Argentine international goalkeeper Hugo Gatti.
