= Silvestro dell'Aquila =

Italian sculptor

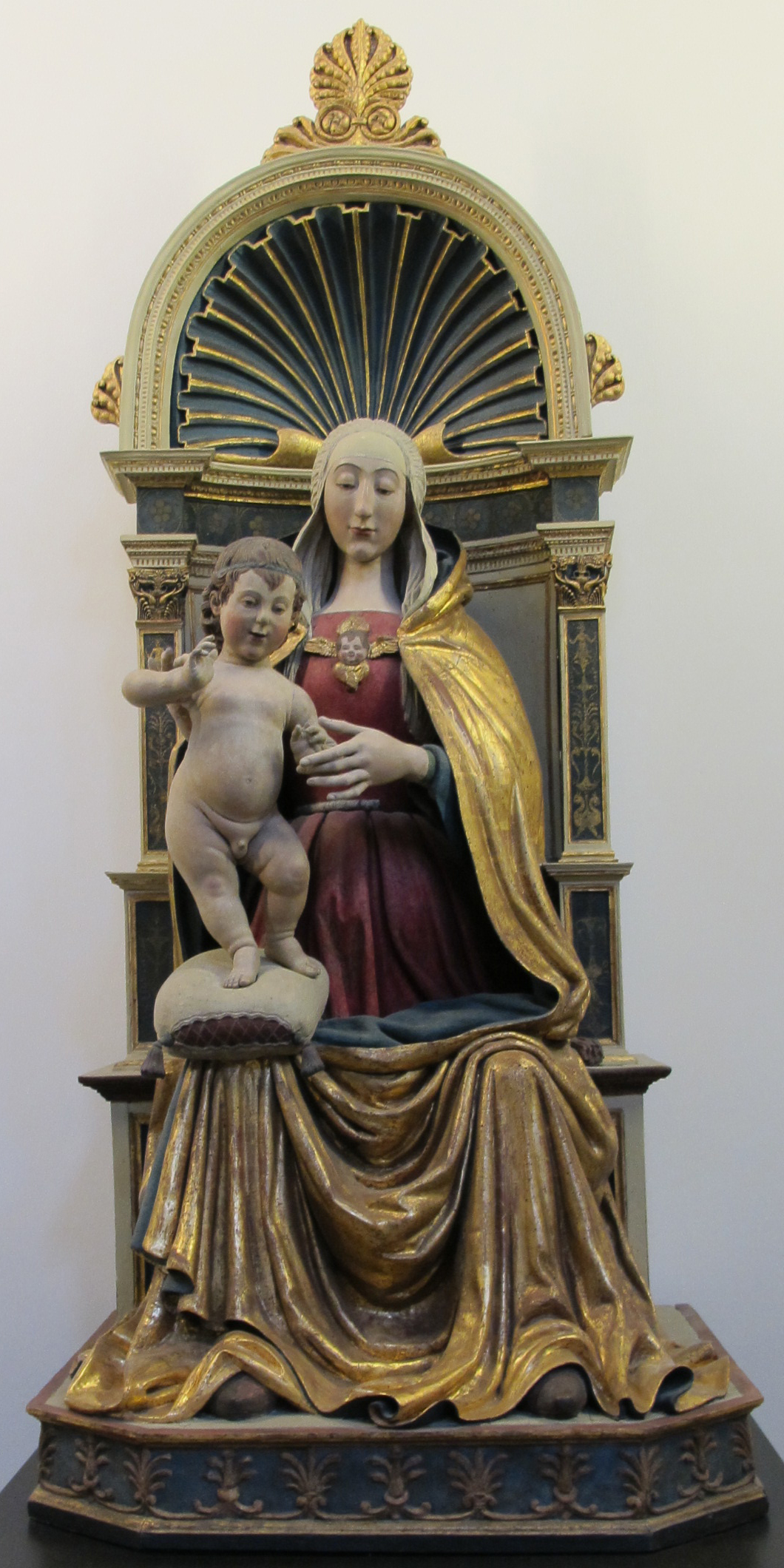
Silvestro dell'aquila (attr.) Madonna enthroned, about 1470-1500

Silvèstro dell'Aquila, also known as Silvestro di Giacomo da Sulmona, (c. 1450, in Sulmona – c. 1504) was an Italian Renaissance sculptor of the late Quattrocento, active in L'Aquila, in the Abruzzo.

It is unclear what his training was, though he shows affinities with Florentine sculpture. Among his works is a wooden San Silvestro (1478) in the Museo Nazionale d'Abruzzo in L'Aquila. He also completed the monument of Cardinal Amico Agnifili (1476–1480) for the Duomo of L'Aquila. He completed the Funeral Monument for Beatrice Camponeschi and Maria Pereyra (1490–1500) and a terracotta group of the Virgin and Child (c. 1494–99) in the church of San Bernardino, L'Aquila.
