= Carlos Tejedor, Buenos Aires =

Town in Buenos Aires Province, Argentina

Carlos Tejedor
- Location in Argentina Carlos Tejedor (Buenos Aires Province)
- Coordinates: 35°23′S 62°25′W
- Country: Argentina
- Province: Buenos Aires
- Partido: Carlos Tejedor
- Founded: January 3, 1905
- Elevation: 102 m (335 ft)

Population (2001 census [INDEC])
  - Total: 5,127
- CPA Base: B 6422
- Area code: +54 2357

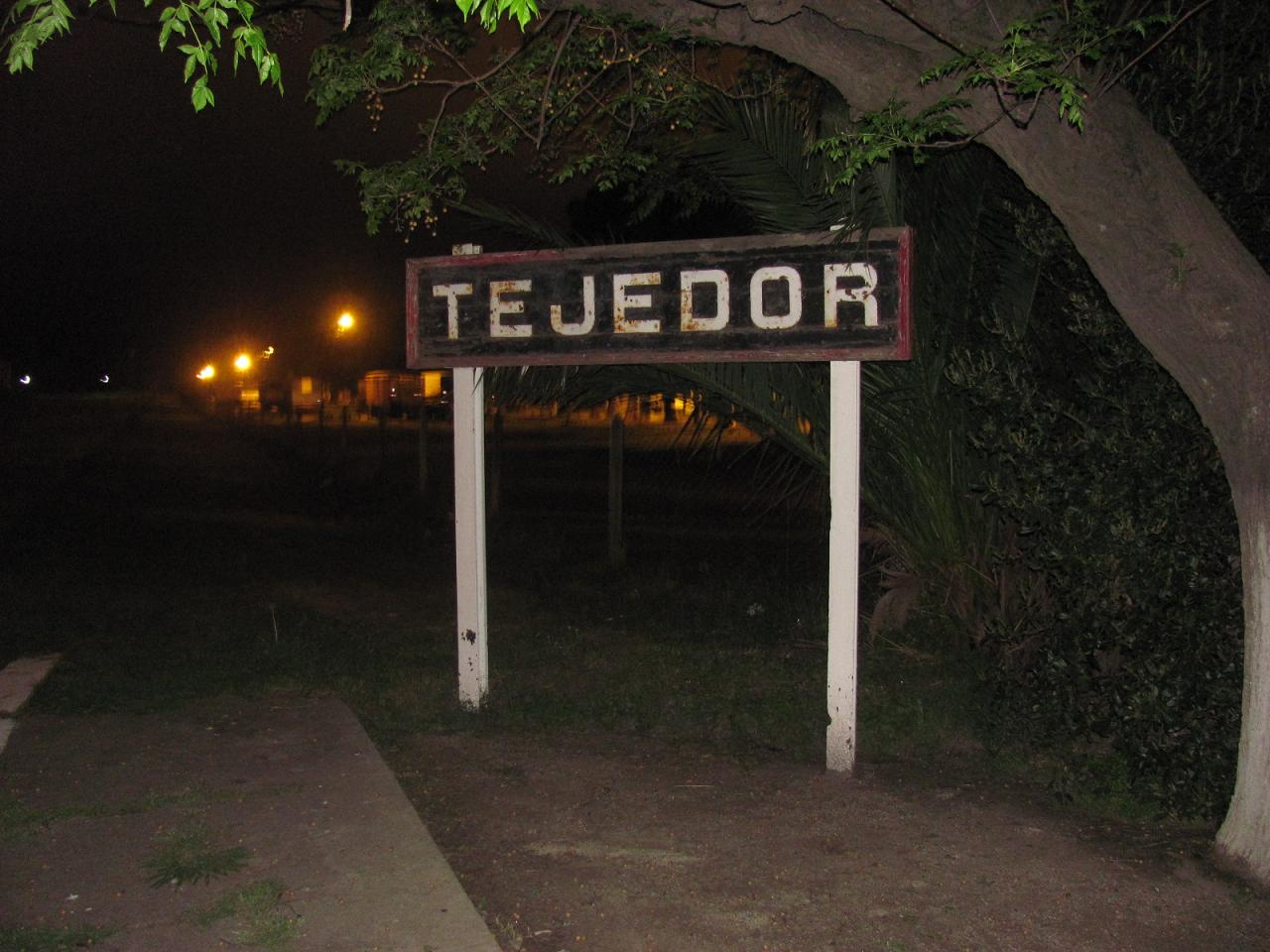
Carlos Tejedor Station

Carlos Tejedor is a town in the north west of Buenos Aires Province, Argentina. It is the administrative centre of the Carlos Tejedor Partido. It is named after the former Governor of Buenos Aires, Dr. Carlos Tejedor.
