= Amico Agnifili =

Italian Roman Catholic bishop

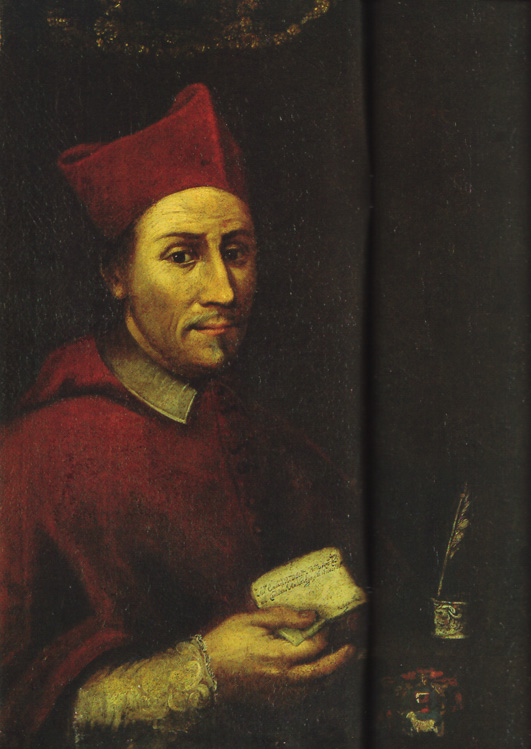
Amico Agnifili

Amico Agnifili or Agnifilo (c. 1398 – 1476), known as the Cardinal of L'Aquila, was an Italian Roman Catholic bishop and cardinal.

== Biography ==
Amico Agnifili was born in Rocca di Mezzo, the son of a poor shepherd. His family had not yet adopted a family name, so when he was elevated to the cardinalate, he chose the name of Agnifili, meaning "Friend of the Lamb".

His father sent him to L'Aquila to be educated. He later studied in Rome under Cardinal Domenico Capranica. Later, at the University of Bologna, he was a schoolmate of Enea Silvio Piccolomini, the future Pope Pius II. He received a doctorate of both laws.

He then returned to L'Aquila, becoming a canon of San Massimo Cathedral and archpriest of San Paolo di Barete. He then moved to Rome and was named a canon of the Basilica di Santa Maria Maggiore. He then became a professor of law at the University of Bologna, where one of his students was Pietro Barbo, the future Pope Paul II.

On 23 May 1432 he was elected Bishop of L'Aquila. While bishop, he served as a counselor to Alfonso I of Naples and his successor Ferdinand I of Naples. Pope Eugene IV named him papal legate to attend the coronation of Sigismund, Holy Roman Emperor in Milan. He later served as legate several other times, including once as legate to the Patrimonium Sancti Petri. Together with Giovanni da Palena, Bishop of Penne, he was the commissary responsible for the canonization of Bernardino of Siena. He was also visited by John of Capistrano. When the city of L'Aquila rebelled against Ferdinand I of Naples, Bishop Agnifili sided with the rebels, which angered Pope Pius II. The rebels returned to their obedience in 1464.

Agnifili's former student, Pope Paul II, named him general treasurer of the church in the Marche. In the consistory of 18 September 1467, Pope Paul II made him a cardinal priest; he received the red hat in San Marco, Rome the next day; and he received the titular church of Santa Balbina on 13 November 1467. In October 1468 he participated in the celebrations surrounding the marriage of Giovanni Antonio Carafa and Vittoria Camponeschi, parents of the future Pope Paul IV. On 13 October 1469 he opted for the titular church of Santa Maria in Trastevere. Pope Paul II put him in charge of overseeing the construction of fortifications at Civitavecchia.

When the news of Paul II's death reached him, he left L'Aquila for Rome on 28 July 1471. He participated in the papal conclave of 1471 that elected Pope Sixtus IV.

He resigned his bishopric in 1472 in favour of his nephew Francesco, but resumed possession of the see after his nephew's death in 1476.

He died in L'Aquila on 9 November 1476. He is buried there in San Massimo Cathedral.
