= Saturnino Gatti =

Italian painter

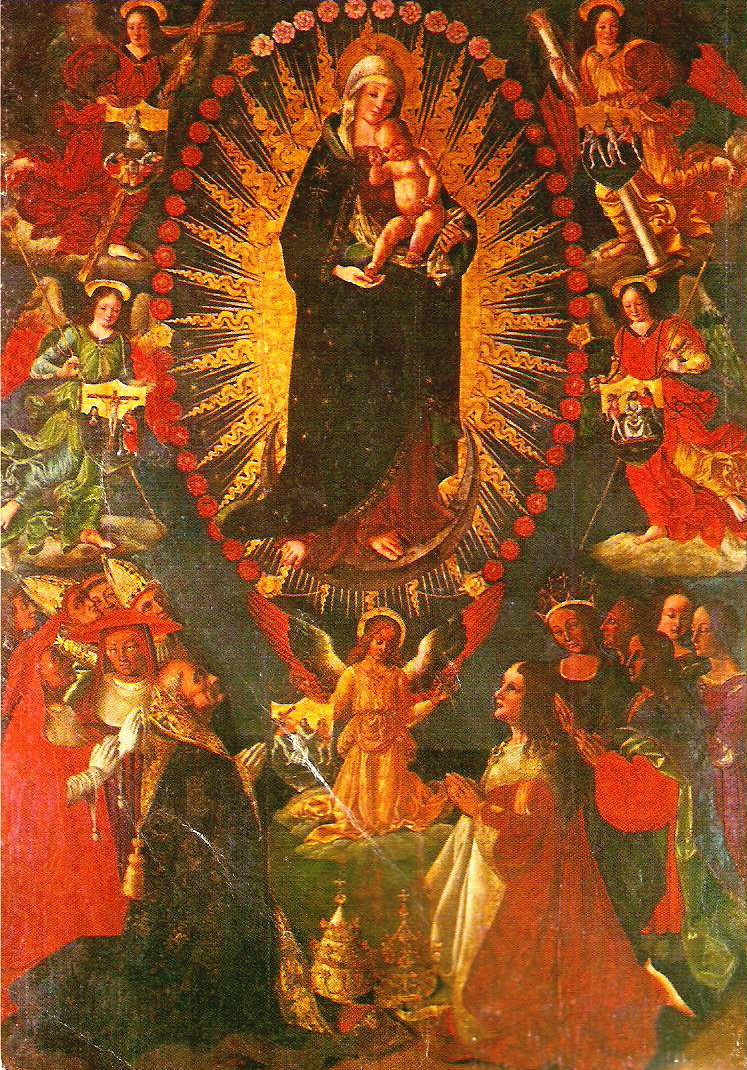
Madonna del Rosario and Donors(circa 1511), Museo Nazionale dell'Abruzzo

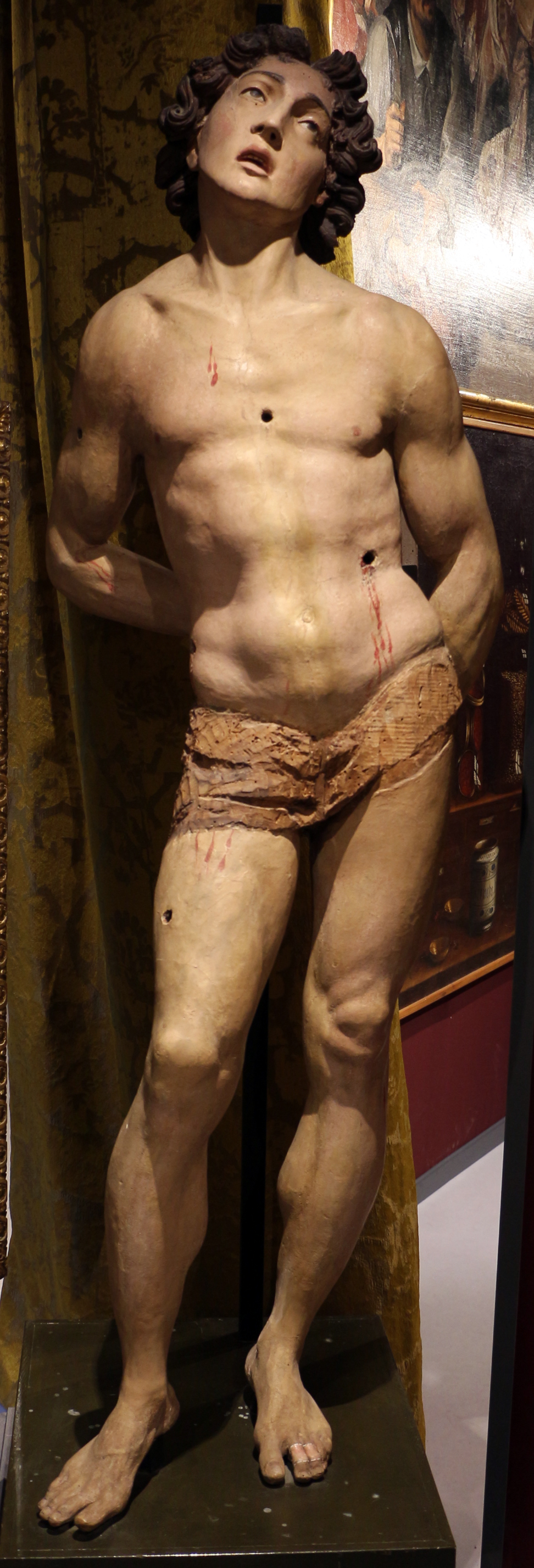
St Sebastian (circa 1490-1510), Museo Nazionale dell'Abruzzo

Saturnino Gatti (1463–1518) was an Italian painter and sculptor active in an early-Renaissance style.

He was born and active in L'Aquila in the Abruzzo region. It has been suggested that Gatti was either a follower or pupil of Pietro Perugino. In 1477, documents suggest he was working alongside Silvestro di Giacomo da Sulmona (Silvestro dell'Aquila). In 1488, he was commissioned to paint a chapel in the church of San Domenico in L'Aquila. In 1489, he painted for the church of San Panfilo a Tornimparte. In 1490, along with Giovanni Antonio di Percossa of Rocca di Corno, with whom he had painted in the church of Abbey of the Holy Spirit at Monte Morrone, Sulmona, and in the church of Santa Caterina a Terranova di Calabria. In 1495, Gatti completes frescoes in the tribune of the church of San Panfilo a Villa Grande in Tornimparte.

== Works ==
- Translation of the House of Loreto (circa 1510)
