= Piani Palentini =

Plateau in upper Marsica, Abruzzo, Italy

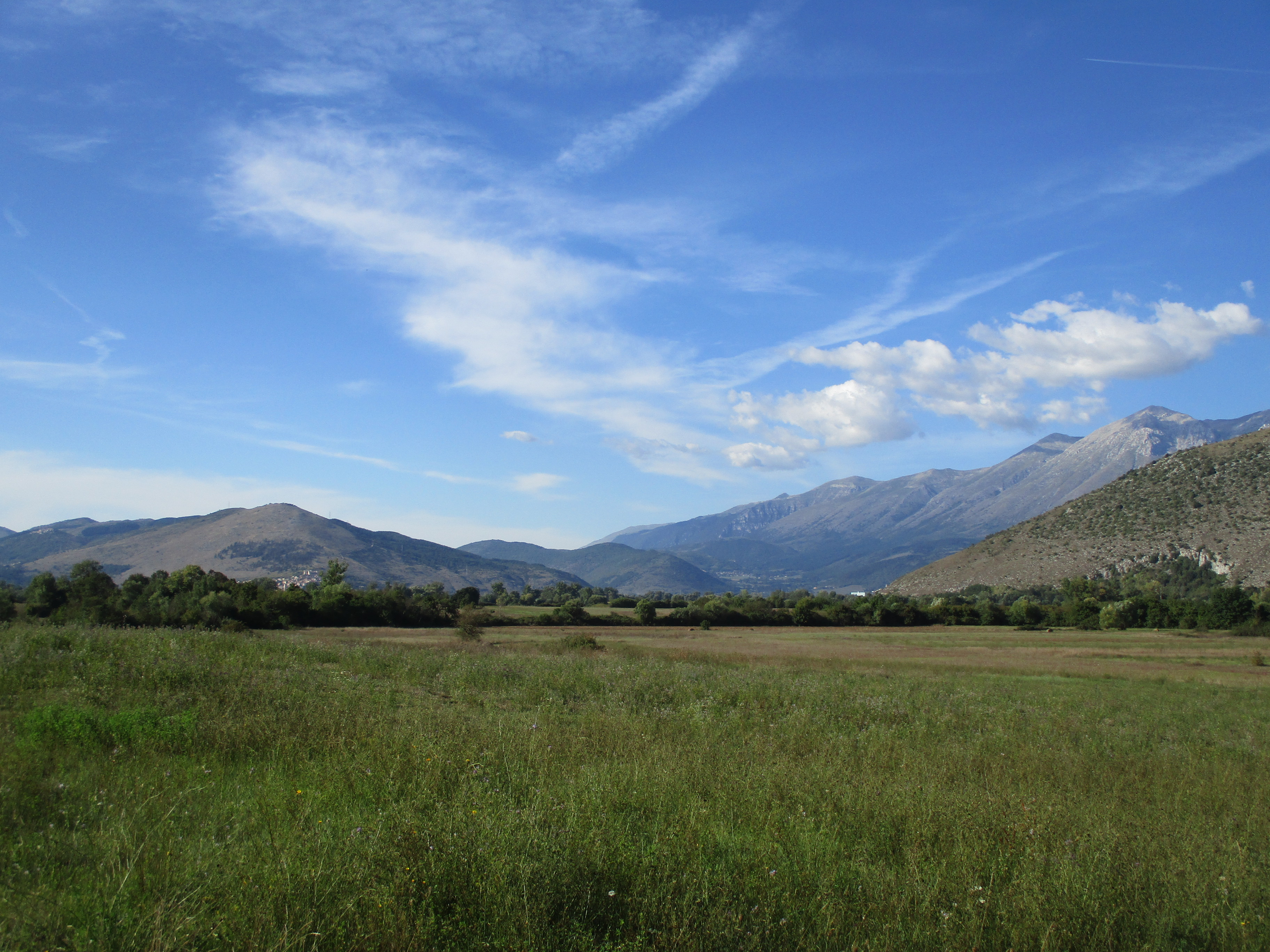
- View of the Piani Palentini

- Location within Italy
- Floor elevation: 700 m (2,300 ft)

Geography
- Location: Province of L'Aquila, Italy
- Population centers: Avezzano, Capistrello, Magliano de' Marsi, Scurcola Marsicana, Tagliacozzo
- Coordinates: 42°01′54.9″N 13°24′04.4″E
- Interactive map of Piani Palentini

The Piani Palentini ([ˈpjaːni palenˈtiːni]) is a plateau in upper Marsica, a subregion of Abruzzo, in central Italy.

== Description ==
The plains, located between 690 and 720 m (2,260 and 2,360 ft) a.s.l., are surrounded by mountain reliefs such as those of the Sirente-Velino group, Mount San Nicola, the Mount Bove massif (Carseolan Mountains), and the Mount Salviano range. Mounts Aurunzo and Girifalco separate the plains from the Nerfa Valley.

This plateau is adjacent to the Fucino plain in the east, and to the upper Cicolano valley in the northwest part, falling within the territories of the municipalities of Avezzano, Capistrello, Magliano de' Marsi, Scurcola Marsicana, and Tagliacozzo. The small Terramone depression, situated between the Cappelle dei Marsi and Magliano de' Marsi territories, is part of the area. The plateau is mostly for agricultural use.

== Origin of the name ==
According to one hypothesis, it would be related to Pales, a deity of Roman mythology, protecting shepherds, flocks and livestock. The area was also known as the Campi Valentini ("Valentine fields").

== History ==
Numerous archaeological finds show that in the Roman age, after the foundation of the colony of Alba Fucens, the whole area underwent a centuriation and the various pieces of land that had been so delimited were granted to Latin settlers. A few years after the first draining of lake Fucino through the building of the Tunnels of Claudius after 52 AD, the Piani Palentini were provided with an aqueduct to serve country villas and facilitate farming activities.

=== Battle of Tagliacozzo ===
In 1268 the Battle of Tagliacozzo was fought in this location, which saw Conradin of Hohenstaufen's defeat, causing the fall of the House of Swabia from the Sicilian throne and Charles I of Anjou's supremacy in the Italian territory.

== Landmarks ==
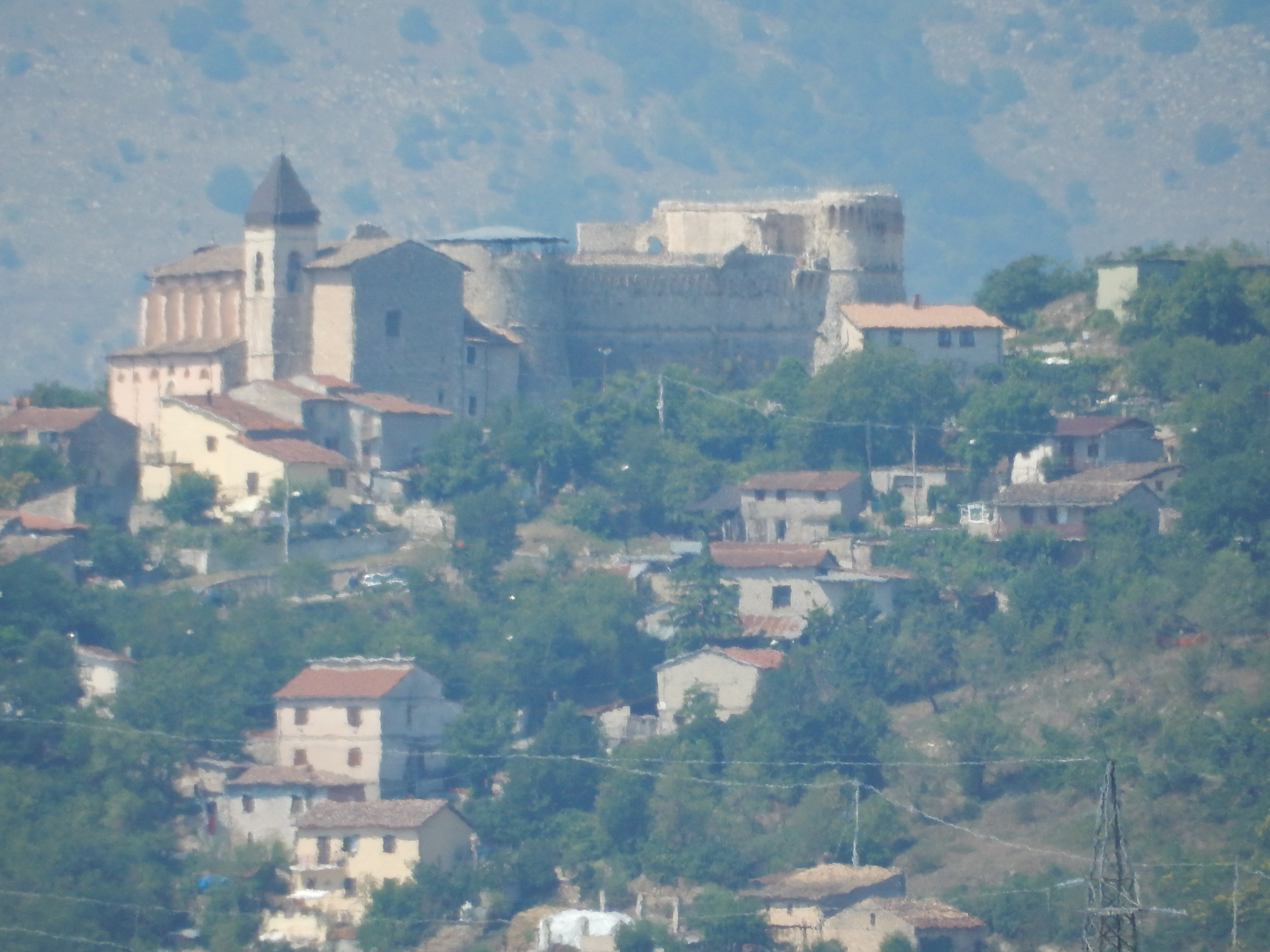
Rocca Orsini in Scurcola Marsicana

- Necropolis of the Piani Palentini in the Scurcola Marsicana territory
- Aurunzo aqueduct, an underground canal designed by Consul Lucius Arruntius and built between 41 and 54 AD, in the same period as the building of tunnels of Claudius at the base of Mount Aurunzo between Castellafiume and Corcumello.
- Rocca Orsini in Scurcola Marsicana
- Church of Santa Lucia in Magliano de' Marsi
- Remains of the supposed tomb of King Perseus of Macedon (Magliano de' Marsi)
- Medieval villages of Corcumello and Rosciolo dei Marsi
- Church of Santa Maria in Valle Porclaneta (Rosciolo dei Marsi)
- Historical centre of Tagliacozzo
- Sanctuary of the Madonna dell'Oriente in Tagliacozzo
- Palentine Caves in the Salviano mountain range
- Orsini-Colonna Castle
