= Fucine Inlet =

- Incile del Fucino (Italian)
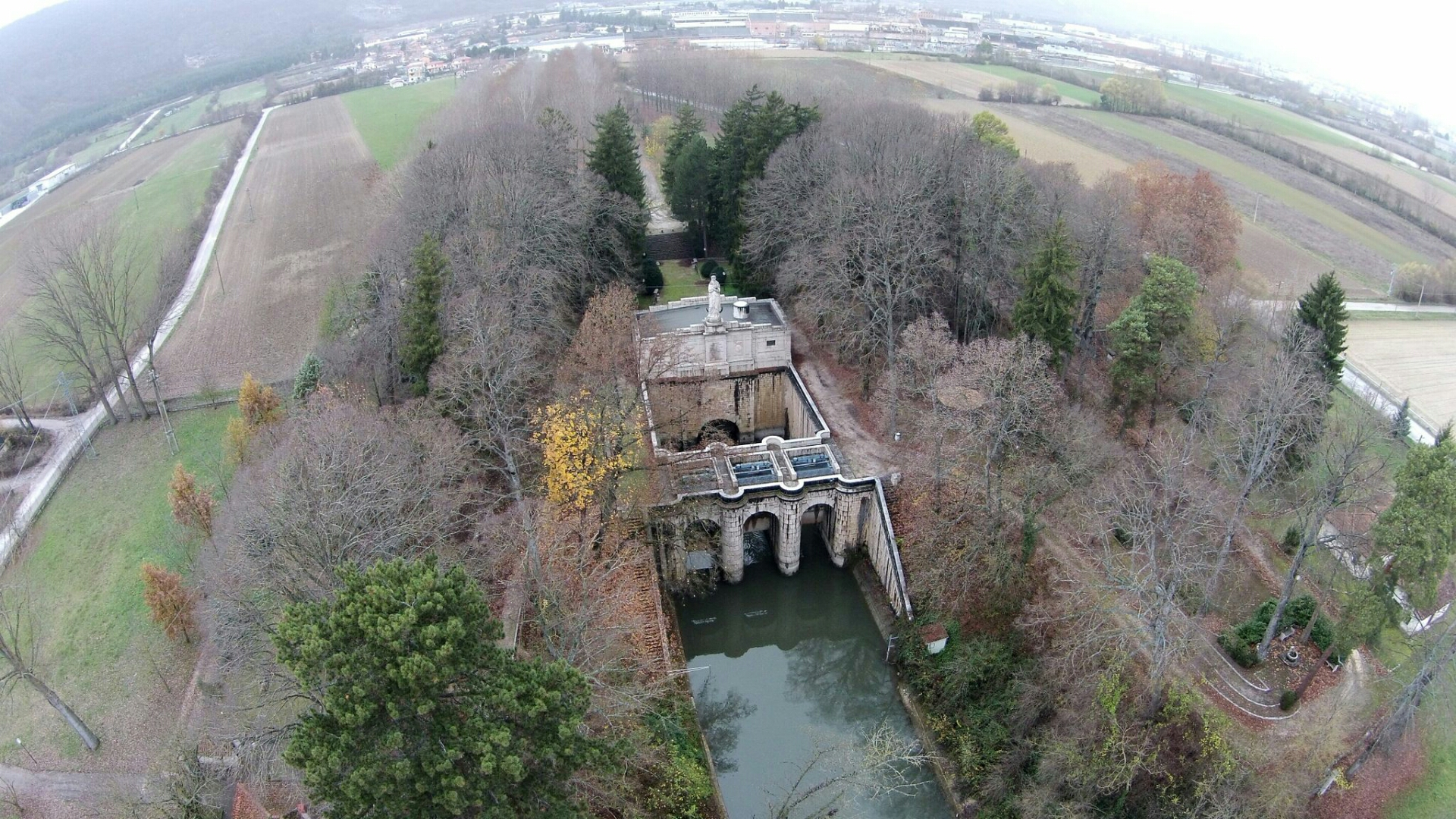
- Artist: Carlo Nicola Carnevali
- Year: 1876
- Medium: Local stone
- Movement: Neoclassical architecture
- Dimensions: over 2,300 cm (910 in)
- Location: Borgo Incile, Avezzano, Italy
- 41°59′36″N 13°27′00.68″E
- Owner: Public

The Fucine Inlet (Italian: Incile del Fucino) is a monument built on the head of the main emissary of the Fucine Lake in Italy. It is made up of the three-arched bridge of the sluice gates and the about 7-metre-high (23 ft) statue of the Immaculate Conception rising above. It is situated in Borgo Incile, a locality south of the city of Avezzano, in the Fucine plain, Abruzzo, Central Italy. The facility, necessary for the drainage of the Fucine Lake, connects the outer drainage canal to the underground emissary which is served by the system of the Tunnels of Claudius in Mount Salviano. The monument was made in 1876 by architect Carlo Nicola Carnevali.

== History ==
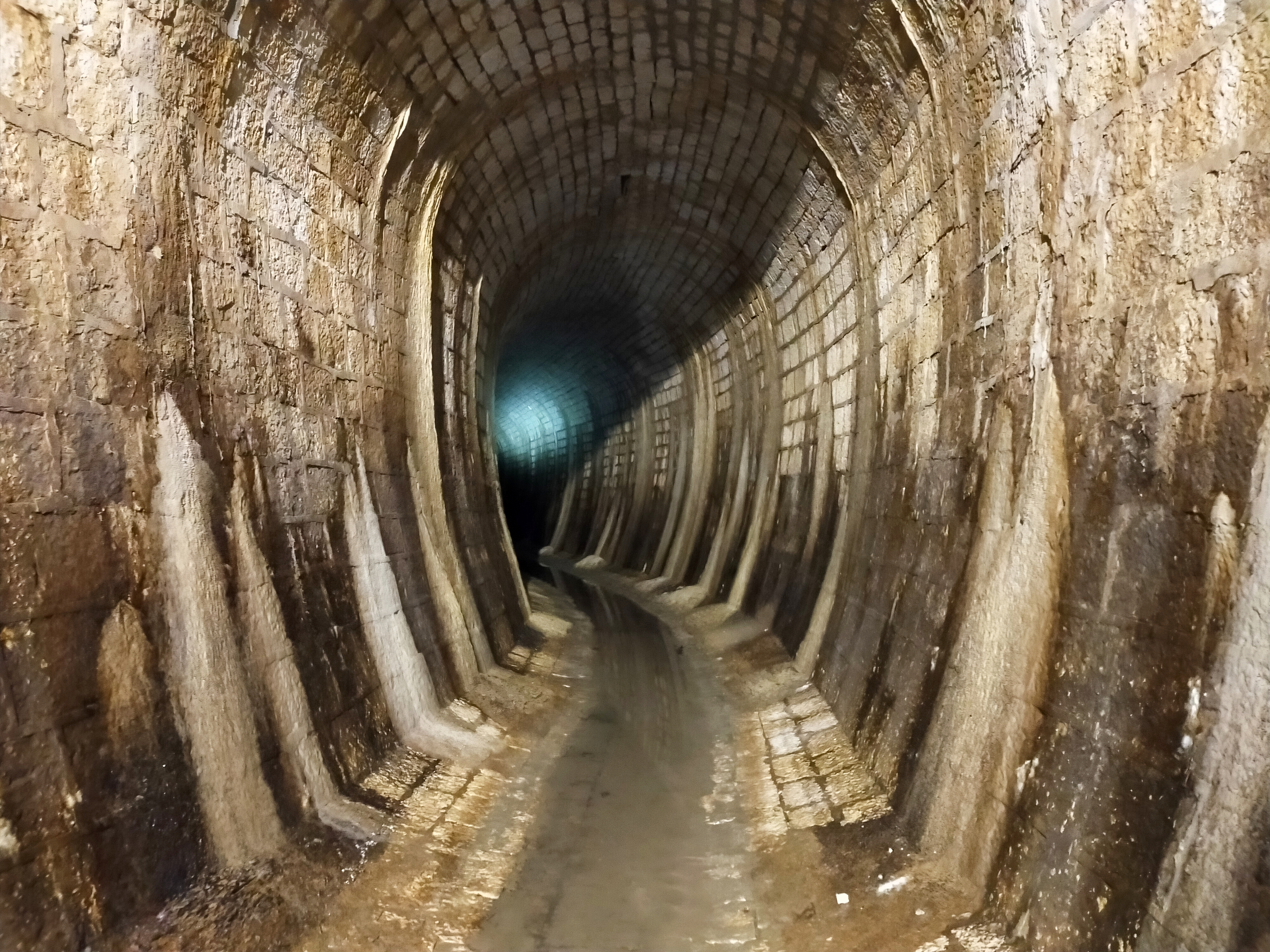
Entrance to the Claudian-Torlonian emissary

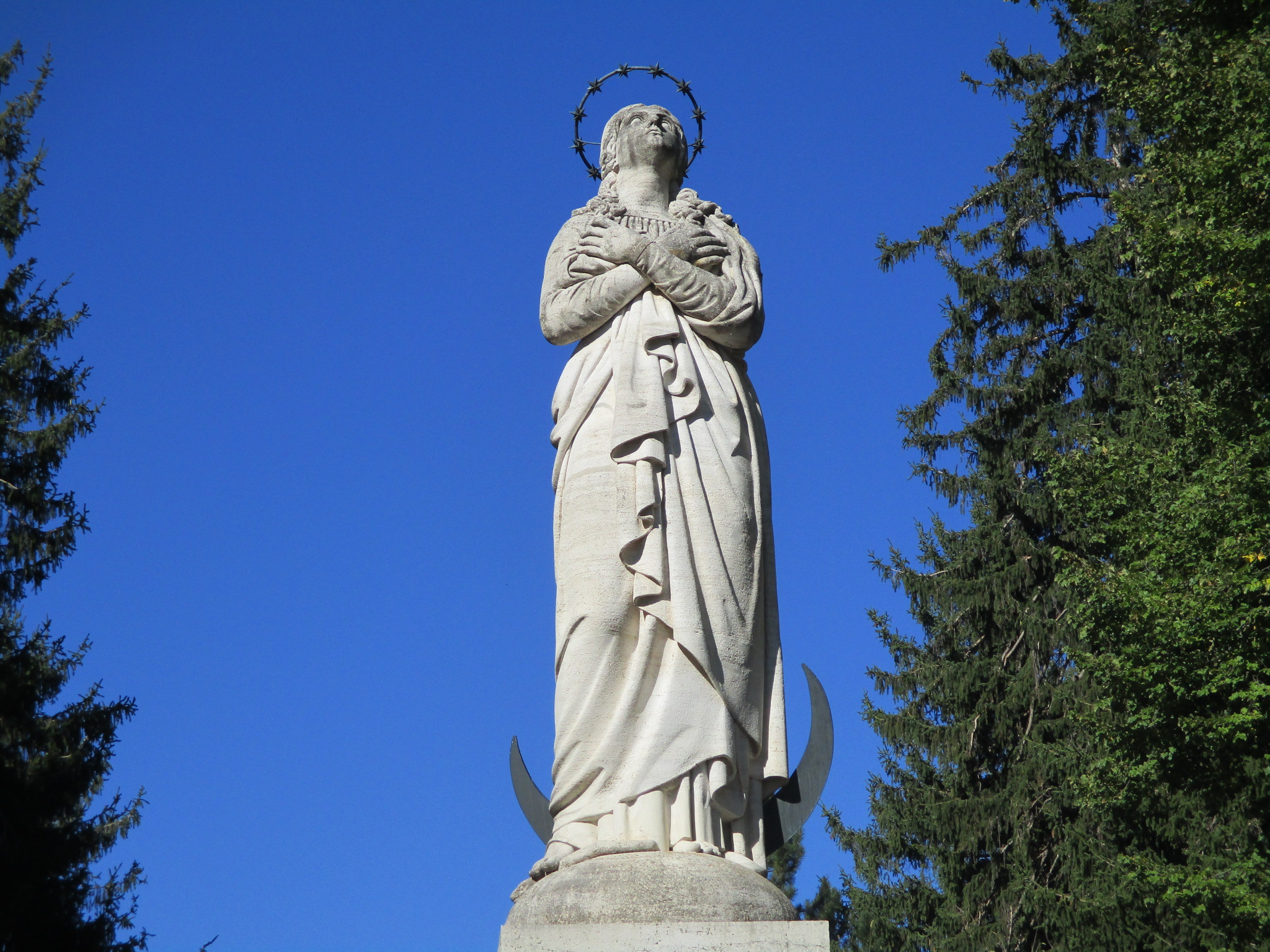
Madonna of the Inlet

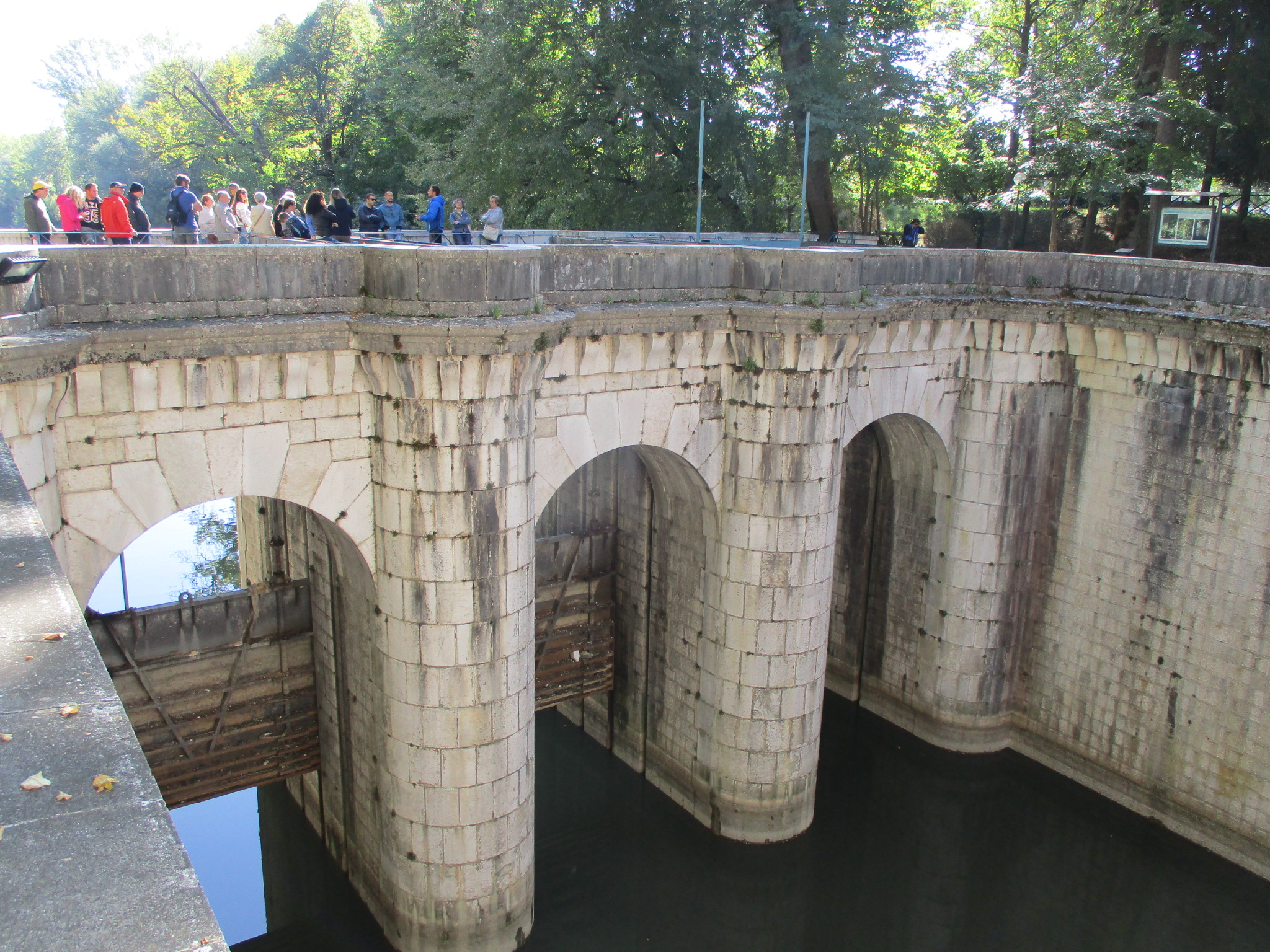
Bridge of the sluice gates

The head of the main emissary of the Fucine Lake was made built by Alessandro Torlonia in 1876 following the occurred drainage of the lake. The Roman banker resumed the works and plans of 18 centuries earlier by which Emperor Claudius carried out the first drainage of the Fucine basin after the impressive digging works of the Tunnels of Claudius and the Roman emissary occurring between 41 AD and the year of inauguration, 52 AD.

With the fall of the Roman Empire a lack of facility maintenance followed, which, most probably after the effects of a serious earthquake occurring in 508 AD, favoured the clogging of the underground canal, with the resulting natural reflood of the Fucine basin where the waters were soon back to the levels prior to the first drainage.

The Claudian plan was resumed in an effective way starting from 1856, 18 centuries later, by Alessandro Torlonia who had the sections of the main emissary enlarged and further vents and inclined shafts built which served the above tunnels. On the higher part of the tunnel, in some points, the original Roman work is visible. In 1876, having achieved the second drainage which was officially declared with a document of 1 October 1878, the Roman architect of the House of Torlonia, Carlo Nicola Carnevali, built the head of the emissary, a monumental work made up of the bridge of the sluice gates and the statue of the Immaculate Conception, situated in Borgo Incile south of Avezzano. From the area of the cleaning works of the Roman inlet and the nearby areas connected to the Fucine territory, several items emerged: four reliefs, depicting scenes from the Fucine Lake and a Marsian town, some inscriptions on marble plaques reporting distance measures in feet, graffiti, some work materials such as a large bucket and an oil-lamp, as well as several archaeological items such as busts, epigraphs and cappuccina tombs.

The working facility regulates the flow of the waters coming from the numerous Fucine canals which pour them into the outer drainage canal. Two basins, the small loading basins, and the fares allow to regulate the waters flowing out into the emissary, the tunnel crossing Mount Salviano at the base for more than 6 kilometres (3.7 mi) before intersecting the course of the Liri River, on the opposite side of the mountain under the town of Capistrello.

The chief site engineer, French Alessandro Brisse, chose the materials for the construction of the work, while architect Carlo Nicola Carnevali supervised the architectural plan, also building in 1876 the adjoining garden in addition to the monument of the emissary head.

A second emissary was built in 1942 by the Torlonia with the purpose of compensating for the main tunnel in case of extraordinary repairs. It starts from the intersection point of the Roman emissary with the outer drainage next to one of the water storage basins. The second tunnel, built southwards, ends up in Canistro next to one of the hydroelectric power plants built by the Torlonia with the aim of generating power for the operation of the Avezzano paper and sugar mills.

== Description ==
The Fucine Inlet is a Neo-Classical style work built by using local stone blocks for the main body of the building, carved out of the quarries that were located in the mountainous territory of Capistrello. It develops on two levels, the lower one below the plane of site which is almost 16 metres (52 ft) high and contains the safety systems, and the higher one which houses the engine-room. In the centre, on a block rises the about 7-metre-high (23 ft) statue in local stone depicting the Immaculate Conception of the Blessed Virgin Mary, which was re-built after the 1915 earthquake. A crescent of moon was fixed at its base, while a twelve-star crown lies upon the Virgin's head. The bronze elements call up the Biblical Apocalypse. Of the original statue, which collapsed following the 1915 Marsica earthquake, only some fragments remain, which are exposed in the park of Villa Torlonia. The so-called Madonnone dell'Incile (literally, "Big Madonna of the Inlet") rises above the three-arched bridge of the sluice gates.

The structure features two water storage basins, one with a trapezoidal shape and the other hexagonal, and three gates (or locks). The first one separates the major hexagonal basin from the forebasin through a gorge. The gate pillars are made up of three round arches. Two side staircases lead to the canal wharfs.

== See also ==
- Fucine Lake
- Tunnels of Claudius

== Bibliography ==
- Campanelli, Adele; et al. (2001). Il tesoro del lago: l'archeologia del Fucino e la Collezione Torlonia (in Italian). Pescara: Carsa Edizioni. SBN IT\ICCU\UMC\0099815.
- Ciranna, Simonetta; Montuori, Patrizia (2015). Tempo, spazio e architetture. Avezzano, cento anni o poco più (in Italian). Rome: Artemide. SBN IT\ICCU\IEI\0408772.
- Proia, Francesco (2013). Polvere di Lago (in Italian). Avezzano: Proia editore. ISBN 978-8890862106.
- Servidio, A.; Radmilli, A. M.; Letta, C.; Messineo, G.; Mincione, G.; Gatto, L.; Vittorini, M.; Astuti, G. (1977). Fucino cento anni: 1877-1977 (in Italian). L'Aquila: Roto-Litografia Abruzzo-Press. SBN IT\ICCU\IEI\0030150.
