= Scurcola Marsicana =

- Comune
- Comune di Scurcola Marsicana
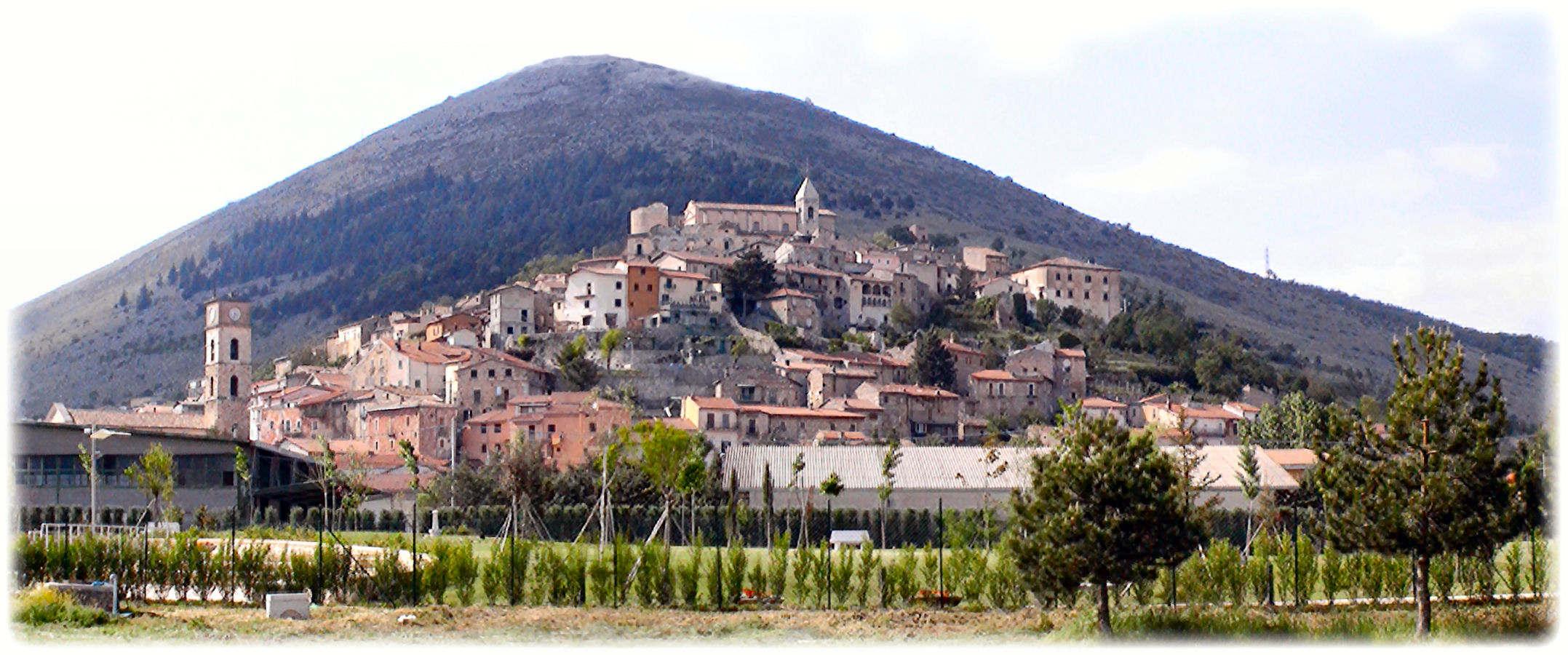

- Coat of arms

- Location within Italy Location within Abruzzo
- Coordinates: 42°03′51″N 13°20′24″E
- Country: Italy
- Region: Abruzzo
- Province: L'Aquila (AQ)
- Frazioni: Cappelle dei Marsi

Government
  - Mayor: Vincenzo Nuccetelli

Area
  - Total: 30.02 km^{2} (11.59 sq mi)
- Elevation: 700 m (2,300 ft)

Population (31 December 2010)
  - Total: 2,813
  - Density: 93.70/km^{2} (242.7/sq mi)
- Demonym: Scurcolani
- Time zone: UTC+1 (CET)
  - Summer (DST): UTC+2 (CEST)
- Postal code: 67068
- Dialing code: 0863
- Patron saint: St. Anthony of Padua, St. Vincent Ferrer
- Saint day: June 13
- Website: Official website

Scurcola Marsicana is a comune and town in the province of L'Aquila, in the Abruzzo region of central Italy.

It is located at the feet of Mount San Nicola, on the western rim of the former Fucine Lake.

== History ==
The most ancient findings of human presence in the area date from the 9th-8th centuries BC.

The name is of Lombard origin, and is first mentioned around 1150 AD.

In the nearby, in the Palentine Plains (Italian: Piani Palentini), was fought the Battle of Tagliacozzo between Conradin of Hohenstaufen and Charles I of Anjou. The city was also the seat of a massacre of the local population by the Piedmontese troops in the aftermath of the unification of Italy.

== Main sights ==
- Church of Sant'Egidio
- Church of Sant'Antonio
- Church of SS. Trinità
- Church of Maria SS. della Vittoria
- Abbey of Santa Maria della Vittoria
- Castello Orsini (Orsini Castle)

== Twin towns ==
- Passau, Germany

== Climate ==
Climate data for Scurcola Marsicana, elevation 730 m (2,400 ft), (1951–2000)
Month	Jan	Feb	Mar	Apr	May	Jun	Jul	Aug	Sep	Oct	Nov	Dec	Year
Mean daily maximum °C (°F)	7.2 (45.0)	9.0 (48.2)	12.5 (54.5)	15.7 (60.3)	20.8 (69.4)	24.8 (76.6)	27.8 (82.0)	28.1 (82.6)	23.7 (74.7)	18.3 (64.9)	11.7 (53.1)	7.5 (45.5)	17.3 (63.1)
Daily mean °C (°F)	1.8 (35.2)	3.1 (37.6)	6.1 (43.0)	8.9 (48.0)	13.3 (55.9)	16.8 (62.2)	18.9 (66.0)	19.2 (66.6)	15.8 (60.4)	11.0 (51.8)	5.8 (42.4)	2.6 (36.7)	10.3 (50.5)
Mean daily minimum °C (°F)	−3.7 (25.3)	−2.9 (26.8)	−0.2 (31.6)	2.2 (36.0)	5.8 (42.4)	8.7 (47.7)	10.0 (50.0)	10.3 (50.5)	7.9 (46.2)	3.7 (38.7)	−0.1 (31.8)	−2.3 (27.9)	3.3 (37.9)
Average precipitation mm (inches)	73.3 (2.89)	80.1 (3.15)	71.0 (2.80)	78.7 (3.10)	63.5 (2.50)	49.0 (1.93)	36.3 (1.43)	39.6 (1.56)	68.8 (2.71)	93.2 (3.67)	122.4 (4.82)	115.0 (4.53)	890.9 (35.09)
Average precipitation days	7.2	7.8	8.2	9.4	8.0	6.0	4.1	4.6	6.0	7.6	9.5	9.2	87.6
Source: Regione Abruzzo
