= Rocca Orsini =

Castle in Scurcola Marsicana, Italy

- Scurcola Marsicana
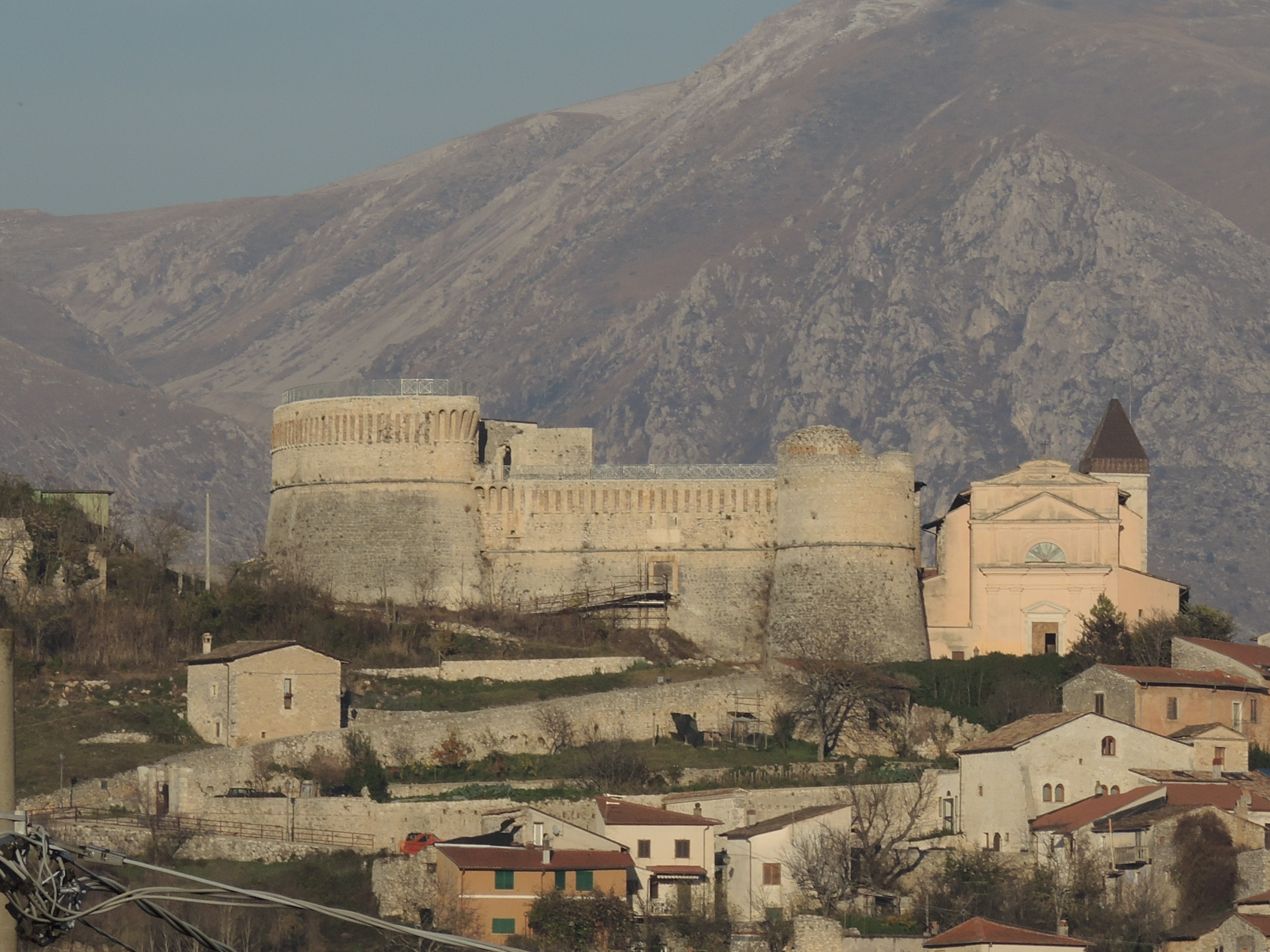
- Rocca Orsini

Site information
- Type: Fortess

Location
- Coordinates: 42.066867°N 13.341307°E

Site history
- Built: 13th-16th century

Rocca Orsini (Italian for Stronghold of Orsini family) is a Middle Ages castle in Scurcola Marsicana, Province of L'Aquila (Abruzzo).

== History ==
Rocca Orsini is located on the highest part of Scurcola Marsicana. It is composed by different structures belonging to different ages.

The oldest part was built by the De Pontibus family and dates back to the 13th century; it is a Norman-Swabian enclosure castle with a structure similar to many other fortifications in the area of L'Aquila, like Castle of San Pio delle Camere. The structure of the castle was based on a pentagonal tower placed at the higher top and a wall with a triangular plant leading down to the valley. Historical sources confirm the existence of this castle (named "castrum Sculcule") during the battle of Tagliacozzo in 1268 between Conradin and Charles I of Naples.

The transformation of the castle in Renaissance fortress took place in the late 15th century by the Orsini family. Gentile Virginio Orsini, Count of Tagliacozzo and Lord of Bracciano, in 1490 involved for the design of the new structure Francesco di Giorgio Martini, already engaged in the construction of the castle of Campagnano di Roma.

The passage of the castle to the Colonna family in the 16th century didn't bring important changes to the configuration of the structure.

== Architecture ==
Rocca Orsini has a triangular plant with two cylindrical towers on the corners of the base and a bastion to the northwest, replacing the previous pentagonal tower of the enclosure castle.

According to the style of Francesco di Giorgio Martini, the triangular plant reduce the number of sides to defend in case of sieges. The defensive system survived also to the spread of firearms, with the presence of bunkers at the lower level to defend the castle from the attackers and thick walls able to resist to mortars. Moreover, the walkway is uninterrupted for the whole perimeter in order to allow quick movements.

The building, abandoned for a long time, was recently restructured thanks to an initiative of a local committee.
