= Fucine Lake =

Former Lake in Abruzzo, Italy

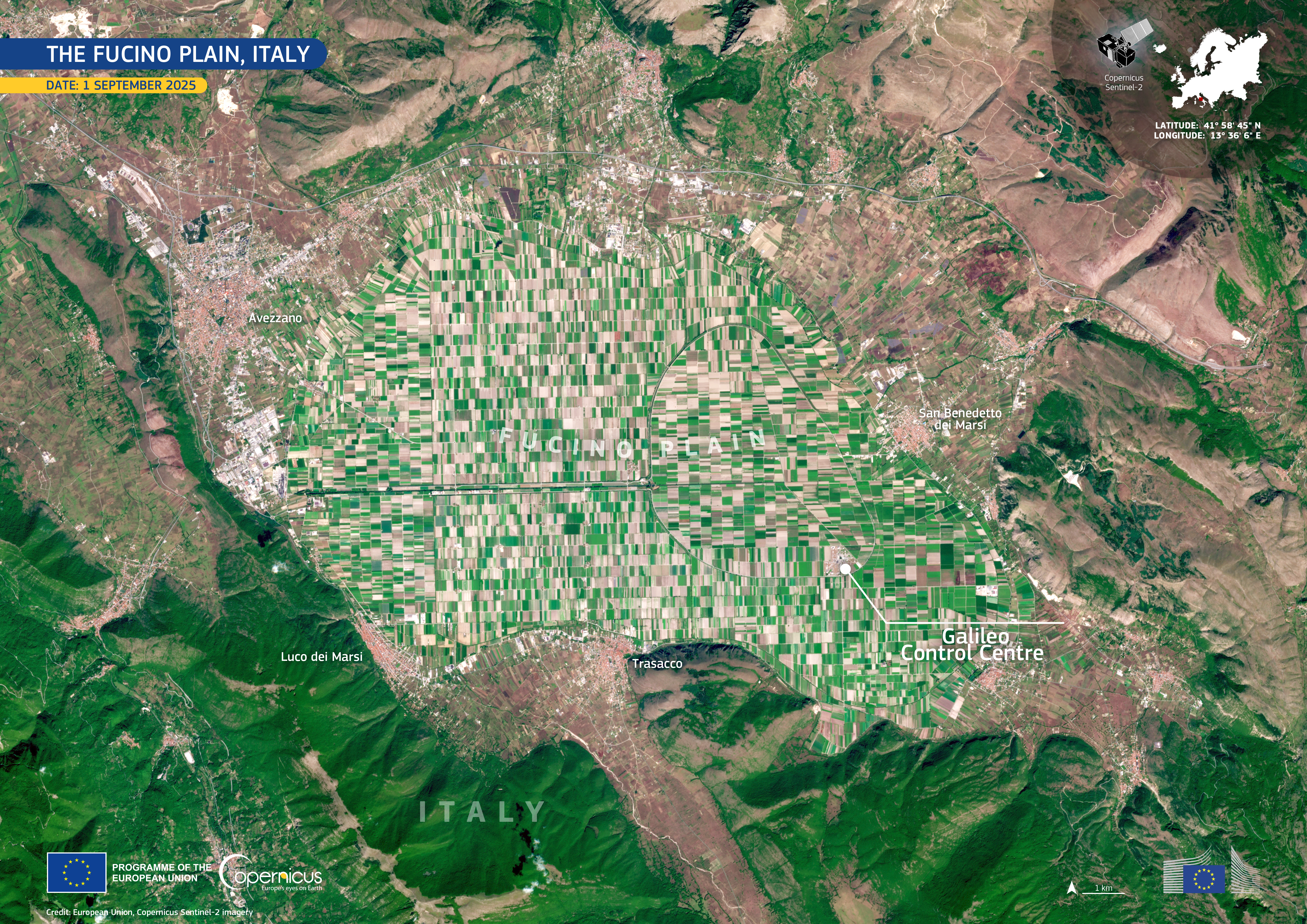
- The Fucine Plain as seen from satellite imagery (post-drainage)

- Location within Abruzzo
- Location: Abruzzo, Central Italy
- Coordinates: 41°59′42″N 13°32′50″E
- Type: endorheic
- Primary outflows: Canal
- Basin countries: Italy
- Max. length: 17.28 km (10.74 mi)
- Max. width: 10.85 km (6.74 mi)
- Surface area: max 140 km^{2} (54 sq mi)
- Surface elevation: 661 m (2,169 ft)

The Fucine Lake (Italian: Lago Fucino or Lago di Celano) was a large endorheic karst lake between 650 and 680 m (2,130 and 2,230 ft) above sea level and surrounded by the Monte Sirente-Monte Velino mountain ranges to the north-northeast, Mount Salviano to the west, Vallelonga to the south, and the Valle del Giovenco to the east-southeast. Located in western Abruzzo in Central Italy, the city of Avezzano lies to the northwest, Ortucchio to the southeast, and Trasacco to the southwest of the historic lake. Once the third largest lake in Italy after Lake Garda and Lake Maggiore, it was finally drained in 1878.

The plain is a geographical depression of tectonic origin formed during the Apennine orogeny between the Pliocene and Quaternary.

To the west, Fucino borders the Palentini plains, while the Giovenco, Vallelonga, and Roveto valleys converge towards the Fucine plain. Due to the absence of outlets and the sudden variations in the water level causing floods or unhealthy drying, it was the subject of numerous attempts at regulation. The first partial draining of the endorheic basin was carried out by the Roman emperor Claudius in 52 AD, through the tunnels of Claudius.

The total draining of the Fucian basin was undertaken in the second half of the 19th century by Jean François Mayor de Montricher, who expanded the hydraulic works of the Roman era by increasing the number of wells and expanding the vents and underground canals. These works and others drained Lake Fucino by 1878.

An improvement in socio-economic conditions followed its draining and the resultant plain is one of the most fertile vegetable growing areas in Italy. Products that have obtained European Protected geographical indication marks include the Fucino potato and the Fucino plateau carrot.

Along the former Fucino shoreline, in addition to Avezzano (the largest city), are other populous municipalities including Celano and Pescina.

In addition to agriculture, the plain also hosts the Fucino Space Centre. The teleport commenced construction in 1963 by the Telespazio company and is used for the ground management of artificial satellites in orbit for telecommunications.

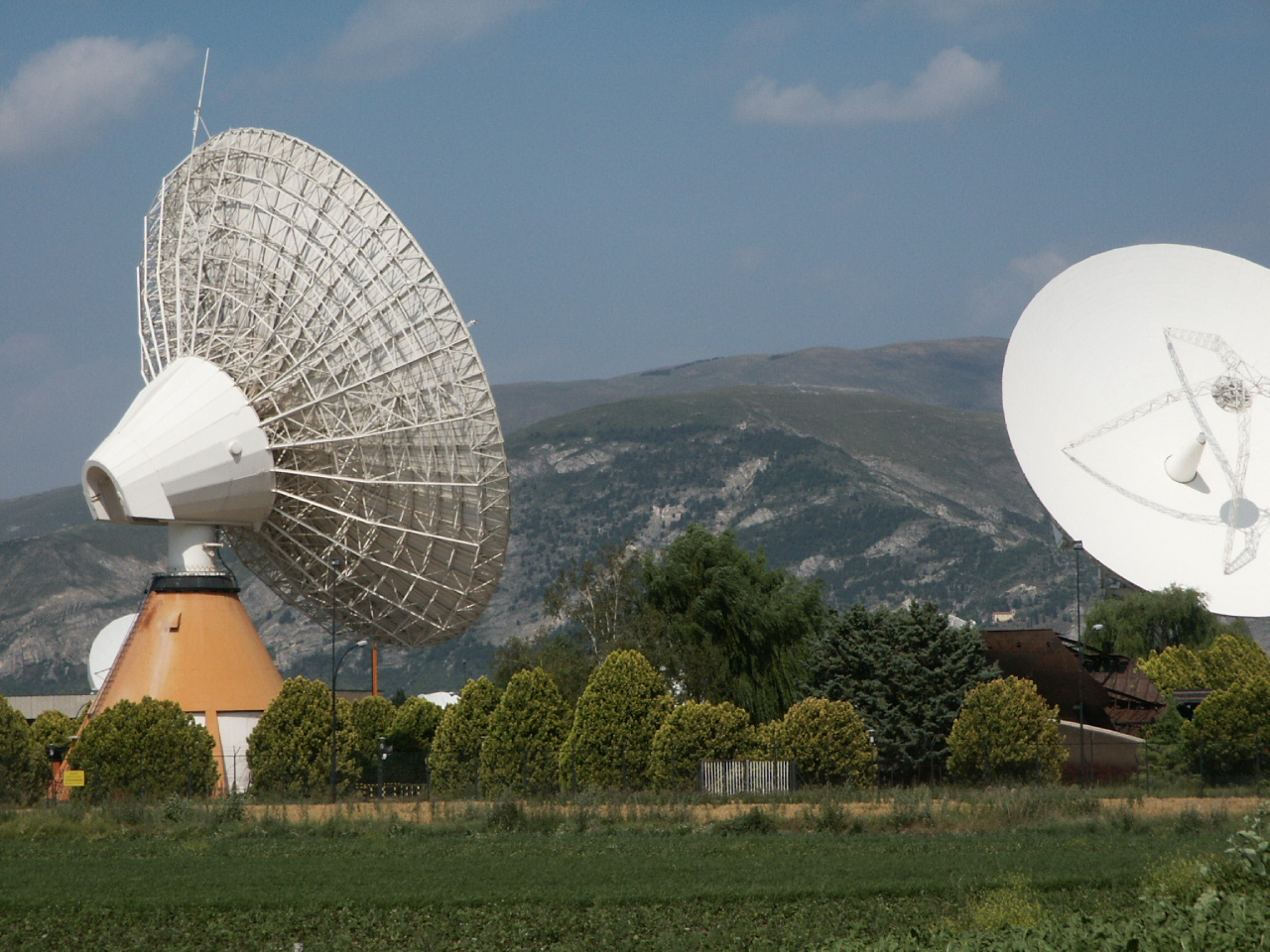
Satellite dishes of the Fucino space centre

== Geology ==
The Fucine basin is the subject of numerous neotectonic, paleoseismological, archaeoseismological, and paleoenvironmental geological studies due to the peculiar "visibility" of its sediments and the structures relating to the formation and evolution of the basin itself. Over time, these characteristics have also helped interpret other Apennine sectors whose context was less clear.

The Fucine is a large tectonic depression surrounded by normal and transtensional faults active in the upper Pliocene to Quaternary era. There is also a late Messinian to early Pliocene compressive deformational phase schematically attributed to four main units, roughly NNW-SSE in direction, converging to the east: "Costa Grande- Monte d'Aria", "Monte Cefalone Monti della Magnola", "Rocche plateau - Aielli-Celano gorges", and "Monte Sirente". These compressive structures deform underlying Mesozoic - Tertiary layers belonging to two depositional domains. The first groups together persistent sedimentation of a platform drowned in the Miocene and the second of areas drowned in the Mesozoic with persistent sedimentation of the slope and basin, the latter immediately northeast of the Fucino. Corresponding to the first domain, the bryozoan calcarenites of the Langhian - Tortonian rest, while there is a gap between the upper Cretaceous and the end of the lower Miocene. In the second domain, however, there is greater continuity until the middle Miocene. This discrepancy may have been created in conjunction with the disjunctive phase linked to liassic rifting which persisted until the middle Miocene.

Alluvial-colluvial continental deposits emerge that can be attributed to the Plio-Pleistocene and Holocene, in particular in correspondence with the ancient lake bottom characterized by silty sediments.

The Quaternary evolution of the basin is linked to the activity of two main faults, one in a NW-SE direction and western dip, tangent to the former lake to the southeast, and the other, tangential to the north, in a WSW-ENE direction and dip southern.

The Abruzzo territory is characterized by considerable seismic activity, mainly linked to crustal distension processes. The Plio-Quaternary deformation field is still active.

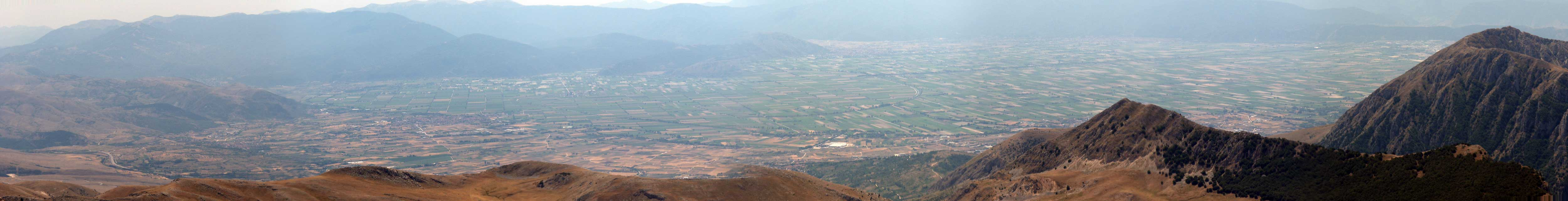
Fucino plain and monte Sirente

== Lore ==
Virgil mentioned the lake in book 7 of the Aeneid, in that it weeps for Umbro, the healer priest killed tragically in battle. (See line 7:882 in the Fagles translation).

== History ==
Lake Fucine was a karst lake system, whose only real tributary was the Giovenco River, entering the basin from the northeast, just after the town of Pescina. The lake also collected, especially in the winter period, the waters of small-flow streams from the Velino-Sirente massif to the north and from the Vallelonga mountains to the south. The water level of the basin was regulated by the activity of the karst sinkholes, located mainly to the south on the slopes of the mountains such as that of Petogna near Luco dei Marsi. The absence of an effective outlet resulted in a high variability of the lake level. These fluctuations are attributable partly to karst drainage or tectonic movements affecting the area, but above all to climatic variations such as seasonal changes in precipitation and the degree of insolation, produced by the Earth's orbit (precession of the equinoxes and obliquity of the ecliptic).

Year	Depth (m)	Volume (m^{3})
1783	13.49	
1787	17.36	
1816	23.01 (maximum known)	
1835	10.23 (minimum known)	715,757,300
1852	14.05	1,123,224,800
1853	16.18 (growth occurred in 40 days)	1,430,928,500
1859	17.78	1,818,113,500
1861	19.44	2,500,000,000
1876	draining completed	
1876–1877	reclamation of the area	
1878	official declaration of the drying out	

The Romans knew the lake as Fucinus Lacus and founded settlements on its banks, including Marruvium. It was the site of the Battle of Fucine Lake in 89 BCE; however, while the lake provided fertile soil and a large quantity of fish, it was also believed to harbour malaria and having no natural outflow it repeatedly flooded the surrounding arable land.

In the 19th century variation of the lake was the greatest on record (12.69 metres of excursion in twenty years). During flood episodes the lake generally invaded only some flat areas at low altitude, such as that between Ortucchio and Venere dei Marsi to the south-east, and not the fans and terraces located at a higher altitude, albeit by a few metres, to the north and east. The geologist Carlo Giraudi located the shore line in the periods immediately preceding the last reclamation, on the Contour line at an altitude of 660.

It is not possible to precisely establish the variations during protohistory, but they probably did not differ much from that of the 19th century. According to Giraudi between 33,000 and 18–20,000 years ago there was a general increase in the lake level, probably the highest level ever reached, followed by a lowering up to 7,500-6,500 years ago, a subsequent rise up to 5,000 years ago, a decrease up to 2,800 years ago, a rise up to 2,300 years ago, a decrease up to 1,800 years ago, which continued until the 17th century of our era, reaching historical limits. During the Little Ice Age in the period 1750 - 1861, the last important rise occurred.

The waters are drained by a system of drainage channels, built in the plain after the Torlonian drainage and subsequent reclamation, which relate to the main drainage tunnel. This crosses Mount Salviano and pours its waters into the Liri river (Basin Authority of the Liri-Garigliano and Volturno rivers).

== Drainage ==
=== Roman ===
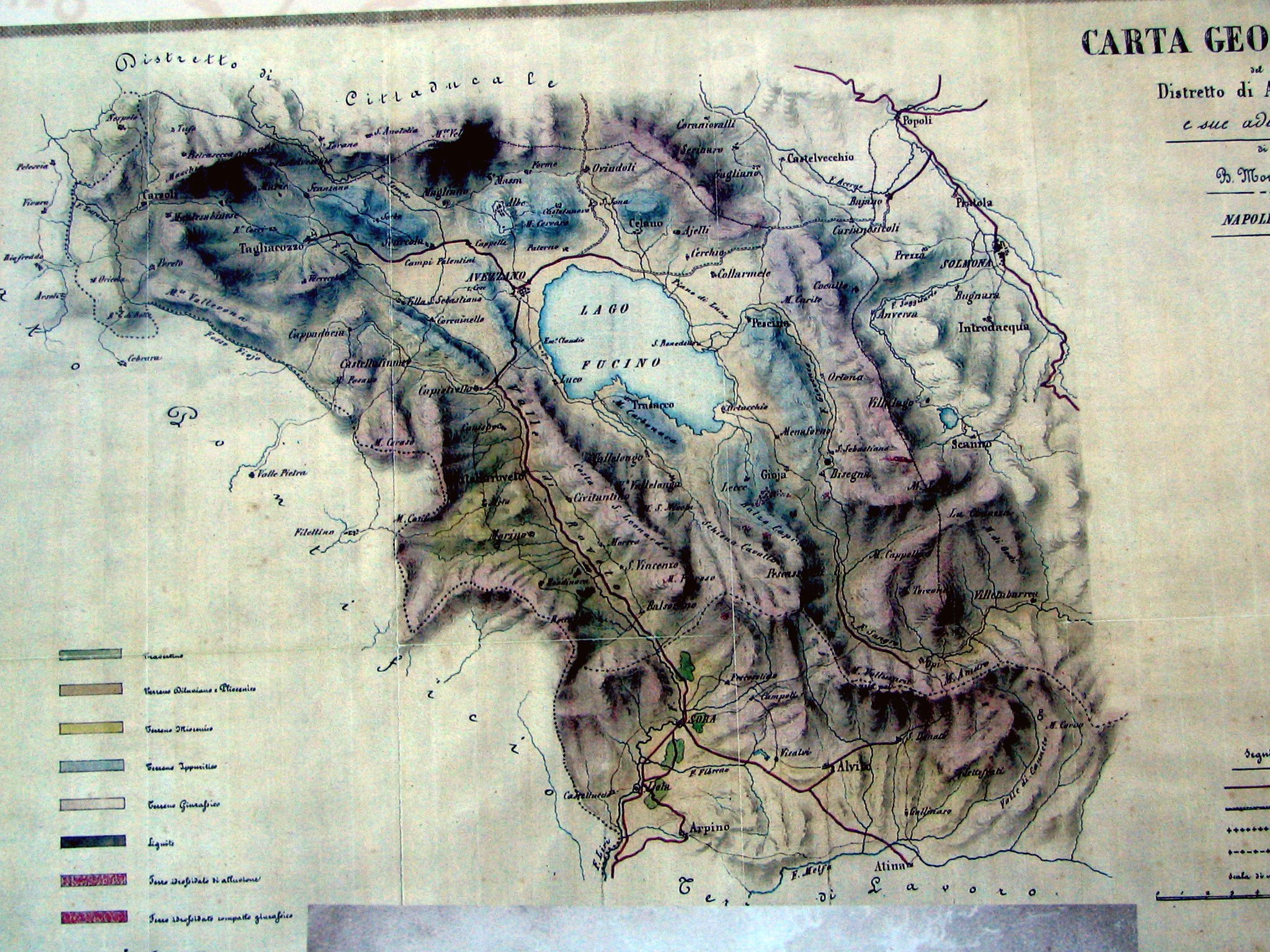
Old map showing Lake Fucino before modern draining

Although the Romans had chosen Fucino as a holiday resort, it was in their era that the need to drain and reclaim the lake began to emerge. The southern areas of the lake were those most subject to flooding and therefore, in addition to the obvious seasonal problems for farmers, another major problem in these marshy areas was malaria.

Authors such as Pliny the Elder, Suetonius, Tacitus and Cassius Dio wrote about drainage projects and subsequent reclamation of emerged lands, demonstrating the importance of this problem.

Julius Caesar was the first who wanted to attempt to drain Fucine, however he was killed before he could do it.

The Emperor Claudius attempted to control the lake's maximum level by digging a 5.6 km (3.5 mi) drainage tunnel through Monte Salviano. According to Suetonius it required 30,000 workers working 24 hours a day in 3 x 8 hour shifts and took eleven years from 41 to 52 AD. The result was a 5.6 km long tunnel under Mount Salviano, capable of partially draining the lake waters into the Liri river.

The outcome, however, was not exactly as planned. Due to the numerous landslides in the tunnel during the construction phase and the periods following the inauguration of the work, simple ordinary maintenance was not enough. Once the work was finished, Claudius wanted to celebrate the work with pomp by organizing the naumachia, a naval battle between the Rhodians and the Sicilians on the lake. At the end of the ceremony the dam was opened but the water did not drain due to a small landslide that occurred shortly before. Once the canal was purged and the locks reopened, a further landslide caused a large return wave that hit the stage where the imperial family was banqueting. The freedmen Tiberius Claudius Narcissus and Pallante were blamed for these events, who were not architects but rather prefects of the works and it was thought that after spending a good deal less than he had received, he had then purposely contrived the collapse, in order that his wrong-doing might not be detected."

With the inauguration of the work, a regulation of the surface waters was effectively achieved, so much so that the lake basin shrank considerably but was not totally dried up, as some historical sources have reported. However, the dangers of floods and health threats diminished, while agricultural activities revived. The economy of Marsica and in particular of the municipalities of Alba Fucens, Lucus Angitiae and Marruvium became flourishing and the surrounding mountain areas were elected to all intents and purposes as holiday resorts.

The original lake had a fluctuating area of about 140 km^{2} (54 sq mi) which the Claudian initiative may have reduced to about 90 km^{2} (35 sq mi). A 4.5 km (2.8 mi) collecting canal was extended and deepened by Hadrian which reduced the area of the lake to about 57 km^{2} (22 sq mi).

The larger 19th century tunnel, along the same route as the Roman tunnel, destroyed most of the archaeology of the Roman tunnel, which is why the success of the earlier Claudian scheme is so uncertain. The deeper Hadrianic canal destroyed the archaeology of the Claudian canal. The final Roman canal has left clear archaeology, showing that 1 km (0.62 mi) from the lake, the tunnel was 7.5 m (25 ft) deep, 19.5 m (64 ft) wide at the top, and 4.5 m (15 ft) wide at the base. It sloped to the tunnel at 0.05% (a gradient of one in two thousand).

=== Drain blockage ===
As the empire fell, maintenance of the Roman drainage scheme stopped. Sediment and vegetation blocked the collecting canal. An earthquake on a fault crossing the collecting canal dropped the land on the lake side 30–35 cm (12–14 in) relative to the tunnel entrance. Investigations where the fault crosses the canal reveal that large amounts of sediment had accumulated in the canal before the earthquake. On the assumption that this earthquake would damage Rome it seems very likely that the earthquake occurred shortly before 508 AD when the earthquake damage to the Colosseum was repaired. The lake appears to have returned to its uncontrolled pre-Claudian area by the end of the 5th century and certainly by the end of the 6th century.

Some suggestion, or attempt, to restore the Roman drainage scheme appears in both the 13th and 15th centuries but neither succeeded.

=== Modern drainage ===
In the 19th century, the Swiss engineer Jean François Mayor de Montricher was commissioned by the prince Alessandro Torlonia to drain the lake. A 6.3 km-long (3.9 mi) and 21 m-wide (69 ft) canal was begun in 1862 and after more than 13 years, the lake was completely drained. The resulting plain is one of Italy's most fertile regions. Antiquities from the Roman occupation of the land, after the first drainage scheme, became part of the Torlonia Collection.

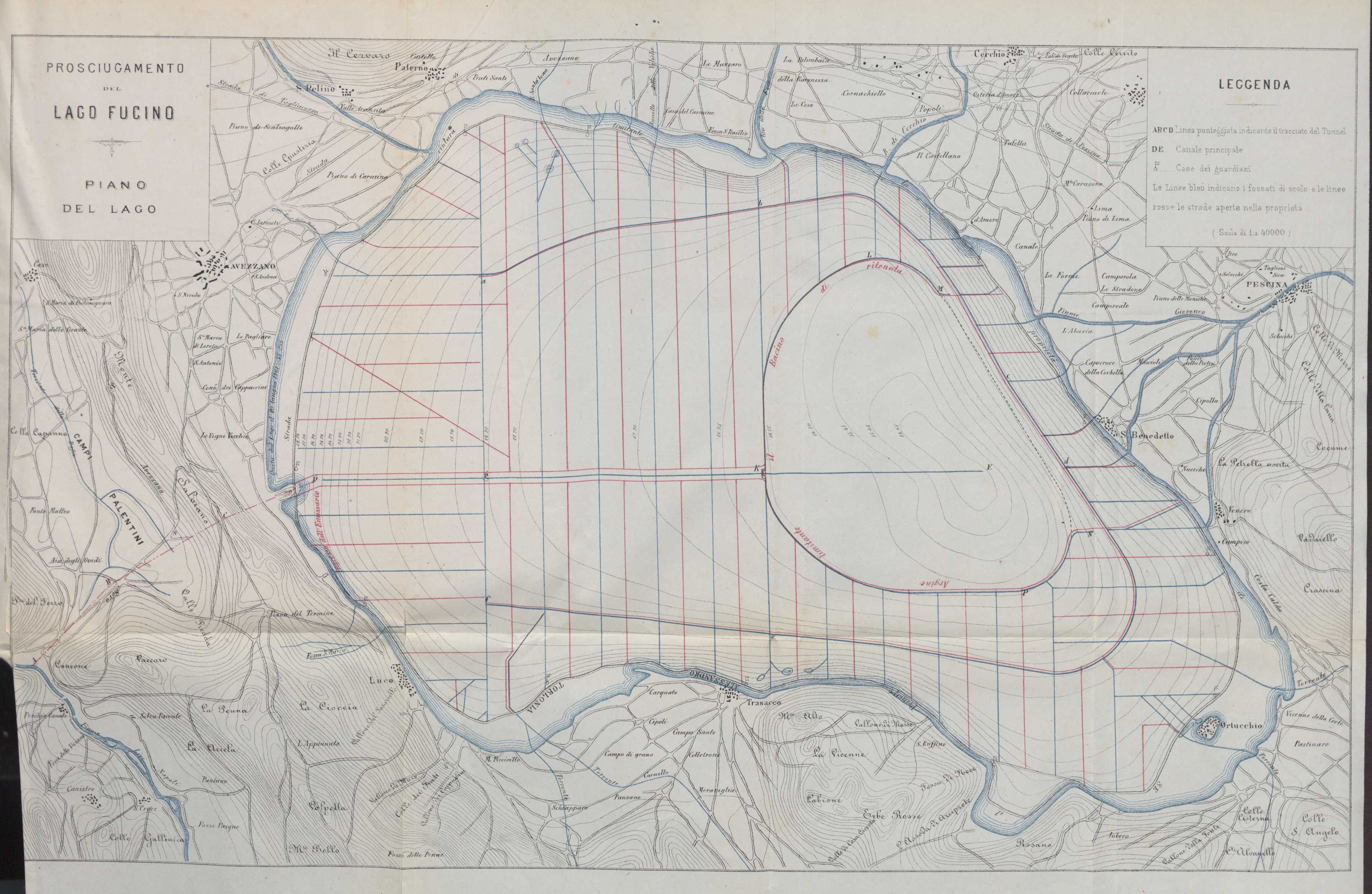
Drainage plan printed in 1875

== See also ==
- Fucine Inlet
- Fucino Space Centre
- List of drying lakes
