= Morino =

- Comune
- Comune di Morino
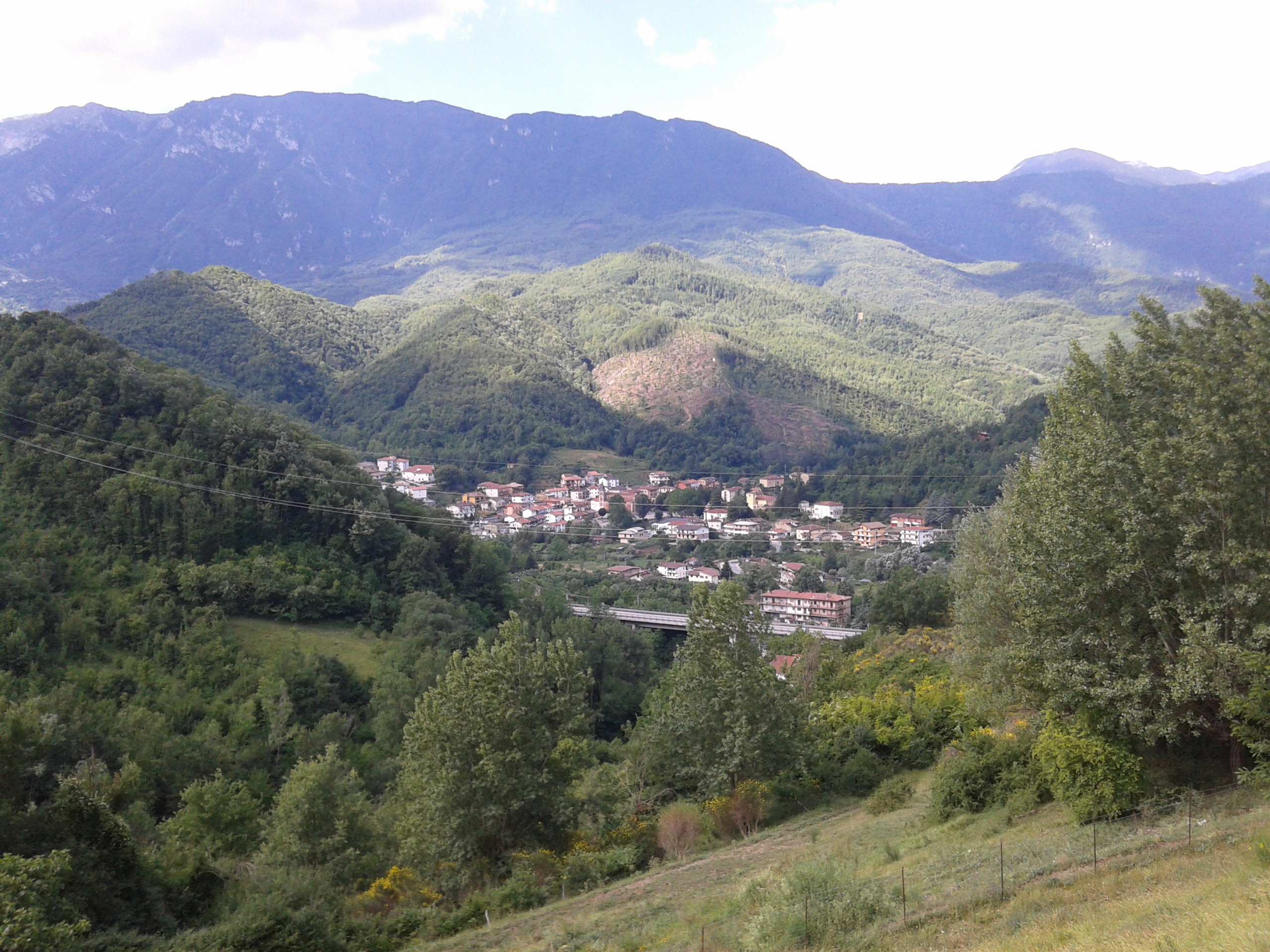

- Location within Italy Location within Abruzzo
- Coordinates: 41°51′55″N 13°27′28″E
- Country: Italy
- Region: Abruzzo
- Province: L'Aquila (AQ)
- Frazioni: Brecciose, Grancia, Rendinara

Area
  - Total: 52.55 km^{2} (20.29 sq mi)
- Elevation: 443 m (1,453 ft)

Population (1 January 2023)
  - Total: 1,303
  - Density: 24.80/km^{2} (64.22/sq mi)
- Demonym: Morinesi
- Time zone: UTC+1 (CET)
  - Summer (DST): UTC+2 (CEST)
- Postal code: 67050
- Dialing code: 0863
- ISTAT code: 066057
- Saint day: 8 September
- Website: Official website

Morino is a comune and town in the province of L'Aquila in the Abruzzo region of Italy.

== Geography ==
A town of Abruzzo, Morino is in the center of the Roveto valley, in the Marsica region. The main area is on the slopes of the eastern side of the Hernici Mounts.

== See also ==
- Hermitage of Santa Maria del Cauto
