= Battle of Tagliacozzo =

1268 dynastic conflict in Italy

Coordinates: 42°01′54.9″N 13°24′04.4″E

- Part of Crusade against the Hohenstaufen and Guelph-Ghibelline conflict
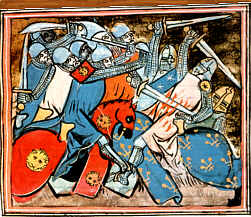
Date	23 August 1268
Location	Palentine Plains (Scurcola Marsicana), province of L'Aquila, present-day Italy
Result	Guelph victory

Belligerents
Guelphs: House of Anjou	Ghibellines: House of Hohenstaufen

Commanders and leaders
Charles of Anjou	Conradin (executed)

Strength
3,000–5,000	5,000–6,000

Casualties and losses
Heavy	Heavy

The Battle of Tagliacozzo was fought on 23 August 1268 between the Ghibelline supporters of Conradin of Hohenstaufen and the Guelph army of Charles of Anjou. The battle represented the last act of Hohenstaufen power in Italy. The capture and execution of Conradin several months after the battle also marked the fall of the family from the Imperial and Sicilian thrones, leading to the new chapter of Angevin domination in Southern Italy.

== Antecedents ==
The German emperors of the Hohenstaufen line, who had inherited the kingdom of Sicily from its Norman rulers in 1194, had continually attempted to consolidate their more long-standing claims to northern Italy as well—an ambition which was vehemently opposed by many northern Italian states and by the Papacy. The resulting struggle between the Papacy and the Holy Roman Empire split the loyalties of many Italians and led to factionalism, the resulting factions being termed the Guelphs and Ghibellines. The death of the German emperor Frederick II of Hohenstaufen in 1250 in the midst of this struggle eventually found his legitimate grandson and heir as King of Sicily, Conradin, in southern Germany, and Sicily under the rule of Conradin's uncle, Manfred of Sicily, the illegitimate son of Frederick II. Manfred ruled in Sicily at first along with his legitimate half-brother, Conrad IV (Conradin's father), and after Conrad IV's death from malaria in 1254, as regent for Conradin. However, in 1258 Manfred declared himself king, despite Conradin's claim, purportedly because of rumors of Conradin's death.

Pope Clement IV, continuing the policy of his predecessor Pope Urban IV, was determined to check Manfred's growing power. He excommunicated Manfred and continued discussions with Charles of Anjou as a secular prince who might, by force of arms, replace the dangerous Hohenstaufens. Bolstered by papal resources, which included a crusading tithe granted to combat the "infidel" Hohenstaufen, Charles entered Italy in 1265 and defeated and killed Manfred the next year at the Battle of Benevento, and began to establish himself as King of Sicily.

After Benevento, Clement IV continued the papal policy of employing Charles to resist the power of the Ghibellines, although with this support was the fear that the Angevins themselves would, like the Hohenstaufen before them, attempt to dominate northern as well as southern Italy and thus menace the temporal power of the Holy See, despite explicit promises by Charles that he would not lay claim to northern Italy. However, the papacy still considered its ancient Hohenstaufen enemy to be the primary threat for the time being, and when Conradin, now aged 15, entered Italy with his army in September 1267 to challenge Charles' rule of Sicily, Clement immediately sought Charles' support in defeating them in Tuscany, appointing Charles as papal vicar.

== Battle ==
After considerable maneuvering, Conradin's army, which enjoyed numerical superiority, confronted that of Charles of Anjou on the Palentine Plains outside the town of Tagliacozzo (more precisely, near Scurcola Marsicana). Each army deployed in three divisions. The first Hohenstaufen division was composed of Spanish and Italian knights, led by the Infante Henry of Castile; the second division was largely composed of Italians but included a body of German knights, and was led by Galvano Lancia; the final division contained most of the German knights, and was led by Conradin himself, accompanied by his close friend Frederick I, Margrave of Baden.

Charles' first division was mostly composed of Italians, with some Provençal knights, under an unknown commander; the second division contained the bulk of the French troops, and was mostly made up of landless knights and men-at-arms in quest of wealth, commanded by French Marshal Henri de Cousances; and finally the third division, which Charles himself led alongside the veteran French crusader, Erard of Valery (who was referred to by the Italians as "Allardo di Valleri"), was composed of veteran French knights. This third division was hidden behind a hill by Charles at Valery's advice, in order to constitute a tactical surprise against the numerically superior Hohenstaufen forces.

Conradin's army dominated the initial phase of the battle. They overwhelmed Charles' first two divisions and put them to flight. A man wearing Charles' armour and who was accompanied by the Angevin banner was killed by Henry of Castile and the banner captured. The Hohenstaufen forces did not realize the man they had just killed was Henri de Cousances and not Charles himself however. Believing the battle was won, they then split up, some to pursue Charles' fleeing divisions, others to pillage the Angevin camp. At this point Charles sprung his trap; his hidden elite reserves entered the fight and decimated Conradin's forces. Conradin fled back to Rome but was later captured, imprisoned and executed. Thus ended the Hohenstaufen's line.

== Sources ==
- Kleinhenz, Christopher (1980). Medieval Italy: An Encyclopedia. Vol. I. New York and London: Routledge.
