= Pagliara dei Marsi =

Coordinates: 42°00′18″N 13°19′17″E

- Frazione
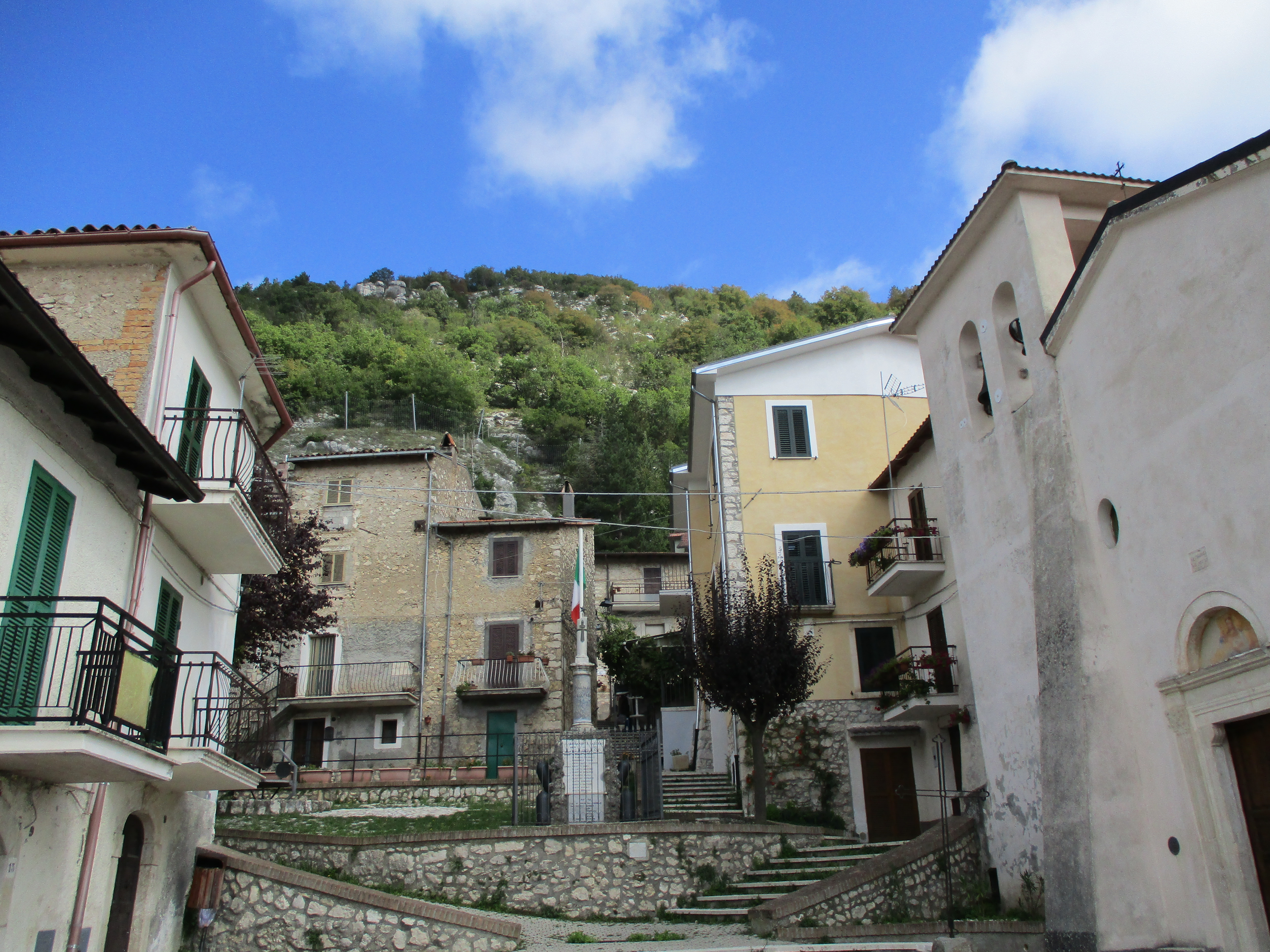
- Interactive map of Pagliara dei Marsi
- Country: Italy
- Region: Abruzzo
- Province: L'Aquila
- Commune: Castellafiume

Population (2025)
  - Total: 24
- Time zone: UTC+1 (CET)
  - Summer (DST): UTC+2 (CEST)

Pagliara dei Marsi is a frazione of Castellafiume , in the Province of L'Aquila in the Abruzzo, region of Italy, near the city of Avezzano, L'Aquila and Sulmona.
