= Valle Roveto =

Apennine valley

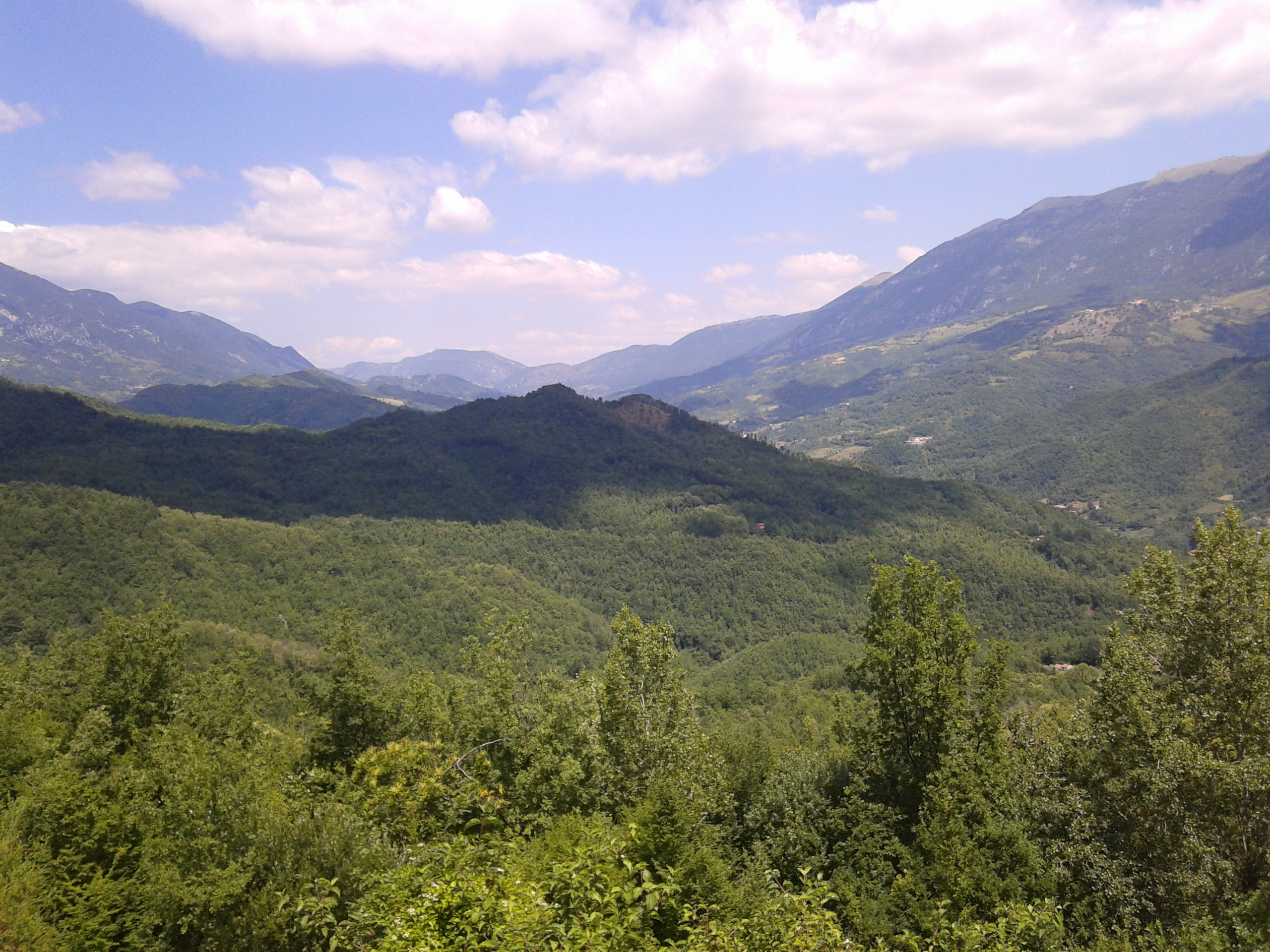
Valle Roveto

The Valle Roveto or Val Roveto (Roveto valley) is an Apennine valley, located in the Abruzzo Apennines, in the province of L'Aquila, in Marsica, a geographical and historical central Italian region. The Valley is crossed by the river Liri and is part of the larger Valle del Liri.

The valley includes the municipalities of Capistrello, Canistro, Civitella Roveto, Civita d'Antino, Morino, San Vincenzo Valle Roveto and Balsorano.

== Bibliography ==
- G. Squilla, Valle Roveto nella geografia e nella storia, Avezzano, Ente Fucino, 1966
