= Hermitage of Santa Maria del Cauto =

Coordinates: 41.8457°N 13.3978°E

- Eremo di Santa Maria del Cauto
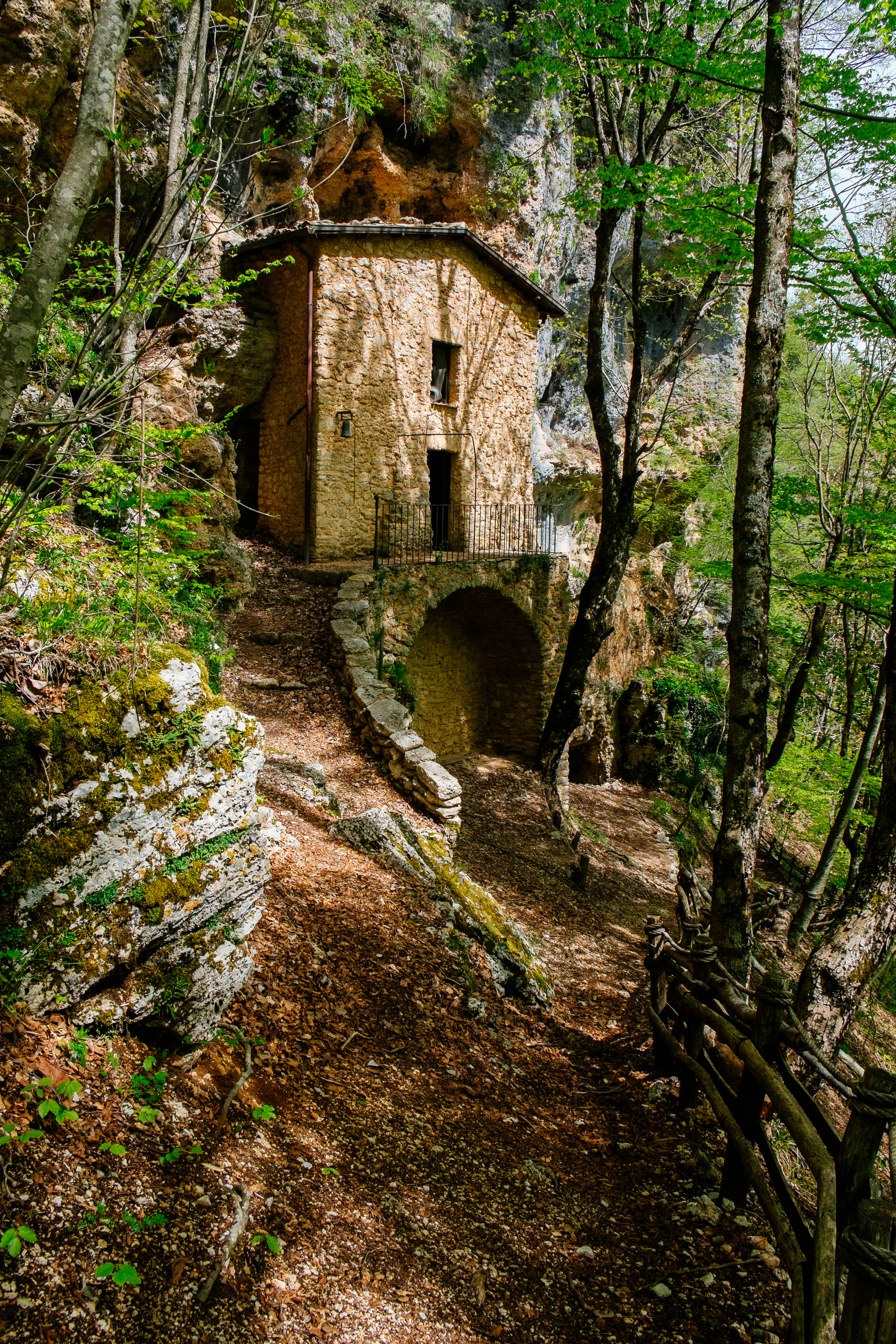
- View of the hermitage

- Location within Abruzzo

Religion
- Affiliation: Roman Catholic
- Province: Province of L'Aquila
- Region: Abruzzo

Location
- Municipality: Morino
- State: Italy
- Interactive map of Hermitage of Santa Maria del Cauto

Eremo di Santa Maria del Cauto (Italian for Hermitage of Santa Maria del Cauto) is an hermitage located in Morino, Province of L'Aquila (Abruzzo, Italy).

== History ==
Since the Early Middle Ages, the area has been frequented by hermits, ascetics, and Benedictine monks seeking solitude in the lush forests of the central Apennines. The geological formation of the region, predominantly limestone and karst in nature, rich in caves and crevices, facilitated the formation of ascetic communities by providing natural and isolated shelters. Additionally, the abundance of water made the area an ideal refuge for spiritual isolation.

Around the year 1000, the influence of the monks from Montecassino began to extend over the entire area, and the first certain records of the hermitage date back to 1174. That year, there was a dispute between the community of monks at the hermitage and the clerics of the Church of San Giovanni in Celano regarding the consecration of holy oils for Maundy Thursday. In 1188, the hermitage was included among the possessions of the Diocese of the Marsi, and subsequently, the Benedictine Abbey of Trisulti, before being donated to the Abbey of Casamari in Veroli. From this event onward, there is no further reliable information about the structure or the monastic community there. However, it is certain that by the mid-17th century, the building had long been abandoned and in ruins.

== Architecture ==
The hermitage and church, nestled into the rock, are supported by a round arch. The modestly sized environment has a barrel-vaulted ceiling and a small apse on the rocky wall. Inside the church, there are murals depicting scenes from the life of Saint Catherine of Alexandria and a portrait of Saint Clement of Rome. At the entrance, there are two tombs, while to the side, beyond the remains of the outer wall, there is a small rocky shelter.
