= Capistrello =

- Comune
- Comune di Capistrello
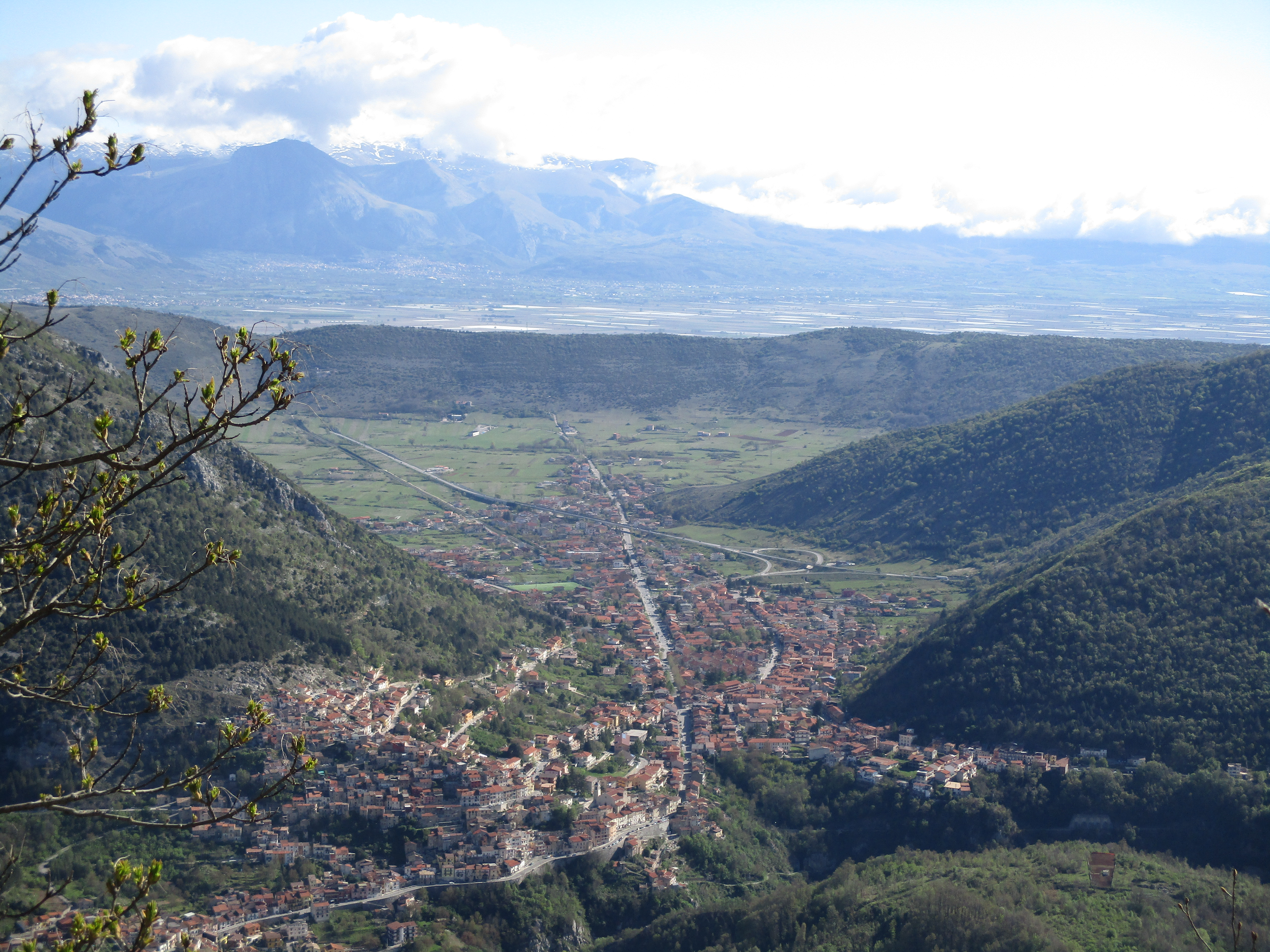

- Location within Italy Location within Abruzzo
- Coordinates: 41°58′25″N 13°24′0″E
- Country: Italy
- Region: Abruzzo
- Province: L'Aquila (AQ)
- Frazioni: Corcumello, Pescocanale

Government
  - Mayor: Francesco Ciciotti (Noi per Capistrello)

Area
  - Total: 60.97 km^{2} (23.54 sq mi)
- Elevation: 734 m (2,408 ft)

Population (31 March 2017)
  - Total: 5,168
  - Density: 84.76/km^{2} (219.5/sq mi)
- Demonym: Capistrellani
- Time zone: UTC+1 (CET)
  - Summer (DST): UTC+2 (CEST)
- Postal code: 67053
- Dialing code: 0863
- Patron saint: St. Anthony of Padua
- Saint day: 13 June
- Website: Official website

Capistrello is a comune and town in the province of L'Aquila in the Abruzzo region of central-southern Italy. It is located at the border between the upper Liri River valley and the Marsica. Capistrello borders the following municipalities: Avezzano, Canistro, Castellafiume, Filettino (Frosinone), Luco dei Marsi, Scurcola Marsicana and Tagliacozzo.

== Climate ==
Climate data for Capistrello, elevation 735 m (2,411 ft), (1951–2000)
Month	Jan	Feb	Mar	Apr	May	Jun	Jul	Aug	Sep	Oct	Nov	Dec	Year
Record high °C (°F)	22.0 (71.6)	24.0 (75.2)	27.0 (80.6)	31.5 (88.7)	31.0 (87.8)	35.5 (95.9)	39.0 (102.2)	42.0 (107.6)	35.0 (95.0)	31.5 (88.7)	25.6 (78.1)	20.0 (68.0)	42.0 (107.6)
Mean daily maximum °C (°F)	6.5 (43.7)	8.1 (46.6)	11.0 (51.8)	14.1 (57.4)	19.4 (66.9)	23.8 (74.8)	27.5 (81.5)	27.4 (81.3)	23.2 (73.8)	17.4 (63.3)	11.6 (52.9)	7.3 (45.1)	16.4 (61.6)
Daily mean °C (°F)	2.3 (36.1)	3.6 (38.5)	5.9 (42.6)	8.7 (47.7)	13.2 (55.8)	17.1 (62.8)	20.0 (68.0)	20.0 (68.0)	16.5 (61.7)	11.6 (52.9)	6.9 (44.4)	3.5 (38.3)	10.8 (51.4)
Mean daily minimum °C (°F)	−2.0 (28.4)	−1.0 (30.2)	0.8 (33.4)	3.2 (37.8)	7.0 (44.6)	10.4 (50.7)	12.4 (54.3)	12.7 (54.9)	9.9 (49.8)	5.8 (42.4)	2.3 (36.1)	−0.4 (31.3)	5.1 (41.2)
Record low °C (°F)	−20.0 (−4.0)	−15.0 (5.0)	−15.0 (5.0)	−8.0 (17.6)	−4.5 (23.9)	1.0 (33.8)	3.0 (37.4)	2.5 (36.5)	0.0 (32.0)	−7.0 (19.4)	−14.5 (5.9)	−15.0 (5.0)	−20.0 (−4.0)
Average precipitation mm (inches)	107.4 (4.23)	108.6 (4.28)	86.5 (3.41)	95.1 (3.74)	68.1 (2.68)	47.6 (1.87)	29.9 (1.18)	42.2 (1.66)	68.7 (2.70)	124.6 (4.91)	169.2 (6.66)	143.4 (5.65)	1,091.3 (42.97)
Average precipitation days	9.0	9.2	9.1	9.7	8.4	6.3	4.1	4.8	6.1	8.1	10.3	9.5	94.6
Source: Regione Abruzzo

== See also ==
- Capistrello massacre
- Tunnels of Claudius
