= Canistro =

- Comune
- Comune di Canistro
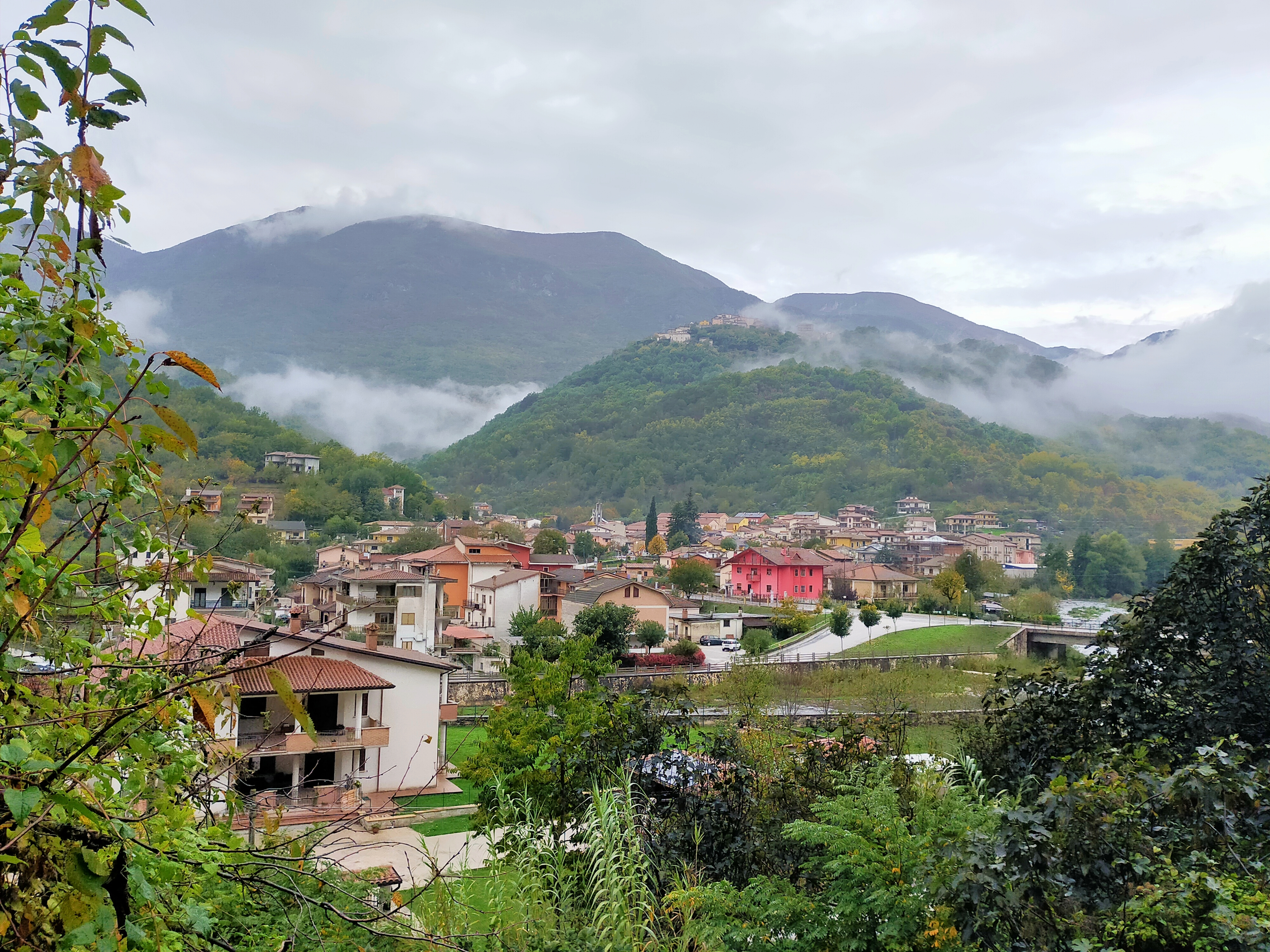

- Coat of arms

- Location within Italy Location within Abruzzo
- Coordinates: 41°56′30″N 13°24′48″E
- Country: Italy
- Region: Abruzzo
- Province: L'Aquila (AQ)
- Frazioni: Canistro Superiore

Government
  - Mayor: Antonio Di Paolo

Area
  - Total: 15.78 km^{2} (6.09 sq mi)
- Elevation: 554 m (1,818 ft)

Population (31 July 2015)
  - Total: 984
  - Density: 62.4/km^{2} (162/sq mi)
- Demonym: Canistrari
- Time zone: UTC+1 (CET)
  - Summer (DST): UTC+2 (CEST)
- Postal code: 67050
- Dialing code: 0863
- Patron saint: St. John the Baptist
- Saint day: 29 August
- Website: Official website

Canistro is a comune (municipality) and town in the province of L'Aquila in the Abruzzo region of central Italy.

== Geography ==
Canistro, located in the Roveto valley, borders to the north with Capistrello and the frazione of Pescocanale, to the east with the municipality of Luco dei Marsi, to the south with Civitella Roveto and to the west with the mountainous territory of Filettino, in Lazio, from which it is separated from the Simbruini mountains. At the bottom of the valley the municipal territory is crossed by the Liri river. Canistro is a famous spa town.
