= Corcumello =

Coordinates: 42°00′18″N 13°21′01″E

- Frazione
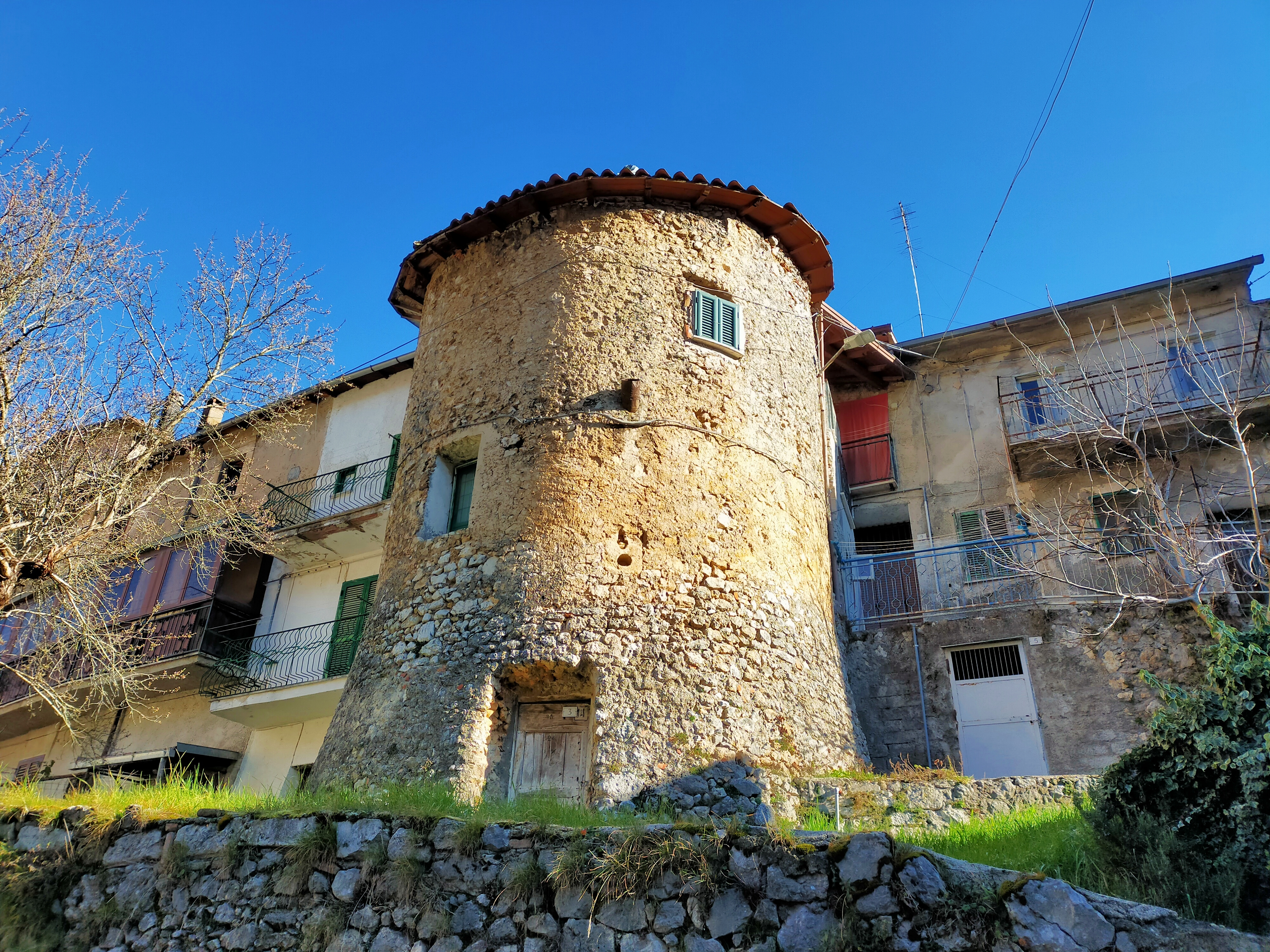
- Interactive map of Corcumello
- Country: Italy
- Region: Abruzzo
- Province: L'Aquila
- Commune: Capistrello

Population (2024)
  - Total: 239
- Time zone: UTC+1 (CET)
  - Summer (DST): UTC+2 (CEST)

Corcumello is a frazione of Capistrello, in the Province of L'Aquila in the Abruzzo, region of Italy.
