= Castellafiume =

- Comune
- Comune di Castellafiume
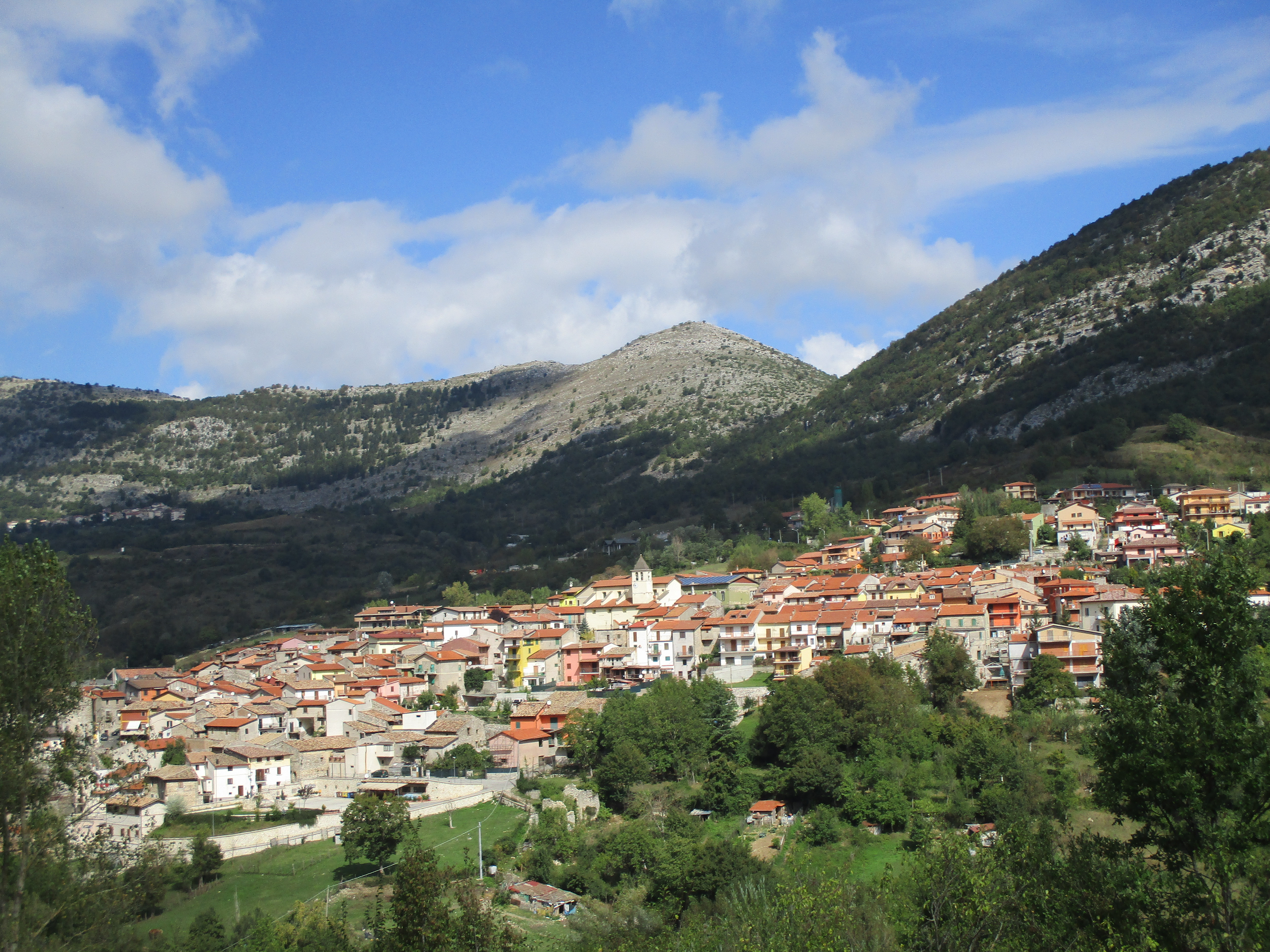

- Coat of arms

- Location within Italy Location within Abruzzo
- Coordinates: 41°59′24″N 13°20′7″E
- Country: Italy
- Region: Abruzzo
- Province: L'Aquila (AQ)
- Frazioni: Pagliara dei Marsi

Government
  - Mayor: Giuseppina Perozzi

Area
  - Total: 24.62 km^{2} (9.51 sq mi)
- Elevation: 840 m (2,760 ft)

Population (09 July 2017)
  - Total: 1,116
  - Density: 45.33/km^{2} (117.4/sq mi)
- Demonym: Castellani (or Castellitti)
- Time zone: UTC+1 (CET)
  - Summer (DST): UTC+2 (CEST)
- Postal code: 67050
- Dialing code: 0863
- ISTAT code: 066029
- Saint day: 6 December

Castellafiume is a comune and town in the Province of L'Aquila in the Abruzzo region of central Italy.

== Geography ==
The town is located on the slopes of Mount Aurunzo on the northern side of the Nerfa valley, in Marsica. Its territory is crossed by the Liri river and also includes the frazione of Pagliara dei Marsi inhabited by a few dozen residents, about four kilometers from the municipal capital. On the slopes of Mount Girifalco are the ruins of the castle of Pagliara.
