= Gaetano Tantalo =

Italian priest (1905–1947)

Venerable Gaetano Tantalo
- Born: 3 February 1905; Villavallelonga, Italian Empire
- Died: 13 November 1947 (aged 42); Tagliacozzo, Italy
- Venerated in: Catholic Church

Gaetano Tantalo (3 February 1905 – 13 November 1947) was an Italian Catholic priest, declared Venerable by the Catholic Church for the heroic practice of virtues exercised during his life, and listed among the Righteous Among the Nations by Yad Vashem for his action on behalf of two Jewish families during The Holocaust.

== Biography ==
Gaetano Tantalo was born 3 February 1905 in Villavallelonga to Maria and Luciano Tantalo, and baptized nine days later. He survived falling into a lime pit at age six..

The following year, Gaetano entered the local school, where he demonstrated exceptional intellectual abilities. He showed an early interest in ecclesiastical life and discipline. At the age of seven, on 29 September 1912, he received his first communion and confirmation from Bishop Pio Marcello Bagnoli of Marsi.

On the morning of 13 January 1915, the Marsican earthquake struck, burying Gaetano under the rubble of his school. He was seriously injured and was transported to Rome for treatment. A lifelong scar on his forehead commemorated this childhood event.

Soon after, his father was called up to serve in World War I, where he died. His widowed mother was left to care for four children. Gaetano, as the firstborn, was expected to share these responsibilities, but Maria supported her son's decision to devote himself to the Church.

In November 1918, he entered the pre-seminary in a temporary building in Tagliacozzo, then transferred to the pre-seminary in Avezzano. He demonstrated outstanding intellectual abilities, impeccable conduct, and a warm and friendly attitude toward his fellow students. In September 1923, he entered the diocesan seminary in Chieti, where he also demonstrated good academic and behavioral achievements.

He was ordained a deacon 3 August 1930, and a priest Aug. 10 at the Church of St. John in Avezzano by Bishop Bagnoli. He said his first Mass Aug. 15 in Villavallelonga.

He renounced the benefices due to him as a local canon. From November 1930 to June 1933 he served as vice-director and spiritual director at the diocesan seminary. As a professor, he taught mathematics, Italian, Latin, and ancient Greek. He was then appointed coadjutor at the parish of St. John in Avezzano, where he served from July 1933 to July 1936. In 1935, after briefly replacing the rector at the parish of Villa San Sebastiano, he managed to establish cooperation between the parish and the local Protestant community.

Due to health problems, in 1936 Tantalo was transferred to the parish of Antrosano, whence he was soon appointed rector of the parish of St. Peter in Tagliacozzo's Altolaterra neighborhood, where he served until his death. He entered the Third Order of St. Francis. He devoted great attention to the spiritual development of children, especially those from poor families, whom he called "snowdrops." He provided financial assistance to their families, and did so tactfully, so that no one felt humiliated.

In August 1940, he met members of the Orvieto and Pacifici families in Magliano de' Marsi. The two Jewish families spent every summer there and had developed friendly relations with the local inhabitants, including the local priest. The latter introduced them to Tantalo. Cordial meetings were repeated in the summer of 1941 and 1942. Enrico Orvieto and Tantalo became friends.

Life changed after the Italian surrender on 8 September 1943, and the Orvieto-Pacifici families fled to Magliano de' Marsi to avoid deportations during the Holocaust. When they no longer felt safe, they moved to the neighboring village of Poggio Filippo. It was just 12 hours before German troops entered the area, establishing their headquarters in the former home of the two Jewish families in Magliano de' Marsi. Thus, remaining in Poggio Filippo also seemed risky. Enrico then decided to seek the help of Tantalo. When he arrived, however, his friend was not there, and he turned to Tantalo's sister, Domenica, and her husband, Adolfo d'Angelo, who hosted them for the night. The next day, Tantalo returned and was delighted to find his friend with his family. Despite the danger, he offered to host the Orvieto-Pacifici families—Mario Pacifici and his wife Gilda Borghi Pacifici, and Enrico Orvieto and his wife Giuditta Orvieto, with their children Gualtiero, Giuliano, and Natan Orvieto—in the rectory. Tantalo introduced them to his neighbors as relatives.

During the nine months they were hosted in the rectory, Tantalo displayed genuine friendship, and was sensitive to their religious needs. He provided them with Bibles; greeted them with "Shabbat Shalom" every Friday evening; and helped them determine the dates of Jewish holidays according to the Jewish calendar, particularly Passover in 1944. For the Seder, he provided them with brand-new dishes and helped them find all the necessary ingredients. A small piece of matzah baked from that Passover remained hidden among his belongings.

In addition to caring for the two Jewish families, during the German occupation he devoted himself to the well-being of the local population. When the retreating Nazis failed to blow up the local electrical substation, on 6 June 1944, suspecting local residents of aiding the Italian resistance movement, they launched a punitive raid on Tagliacozzo. The Nazis selected several hostages to be shot if the guilty were not handed over to them within 24 hours. Tantalo offered himself as a voluntary hostage in exchange for the local residents, but the occupiers laughed at him, and that night the Nazis fled Tagliacozzo under the onslaught of the advancing Allies, without having time to execute a single hostage.

After the liberation, in July 1944, the Orvieto-Pacifici families left the church of San Pietro in Tagliacozzo and returned to Rome. Holocaust survivors, they always remained in close contact with Tantalo. When he suffered from lung disease, Giuditta Orvieto helped him obtain the best medical care.

The priest died 13 November 1947. He had suffered a long illness from bronchial pneumonia. Treatment at a clinic in Rome, paid for by his friends Pacifici and Orvieto, was ineffective. He died in Tagliacozzo, but according to his wishes, he was buried in the cemetery in his native Villavallelonga.

Immediately after his death, his grave became a place of pilgrimage. In 1953, his compatriots, without disturbing the modest tombstone with the inscription "11/13/47 Don G.T.", erected a large cross in the center of the cemetery with an inscription of gratitude. On 24 August 1958, the coffin containing the body of the deceased priest was exhumed and laid in the chapel built for him. On 3 September 1980, his remains were transferred to the parish church of Saints Leucio and Nicholas in Villavallelonga, where they remain to this day.

In 1969, Gaetano Meaolo wrote the first biography of Tantalo, Un Testimone: don Gaetano Tantalo, which was followed by numerous other publications and testimonies.

On May 31, 1978, Yad Vashem recognized Tantalo as a Righteous Among the Nations, and his name was placed at the foot of a tree planted on March 7, 1982, in the Garden of the Righteous Among the Nations in Jerusalem.

Bishop Biagio Vittorio Terrinoni of Marsi initiated the process of beatification for Tantalo. On 15 March 1980, Pope John Paul II confirmed this process with the official declaration nihil obstat, proclaiming him a servant of God. On 15 December 1994, the Sacred Congregation for the Causes of Saints decided to recognize the priest's virtues as having reached a heroic degree. On 6 April 1995, John Paul II declared him Venerable. That autumn, he secretly visited the parish in Villavallelonga and prayed at the ascetic's tomb. The process of beatifying the priest is ongoing. Associations named after him, "Don Gaetano Tantalo," are based in Tagliacozzo and Villavallelonga.
