= Giovanni Argoli =

Italian scholar and poet (1609–1660)

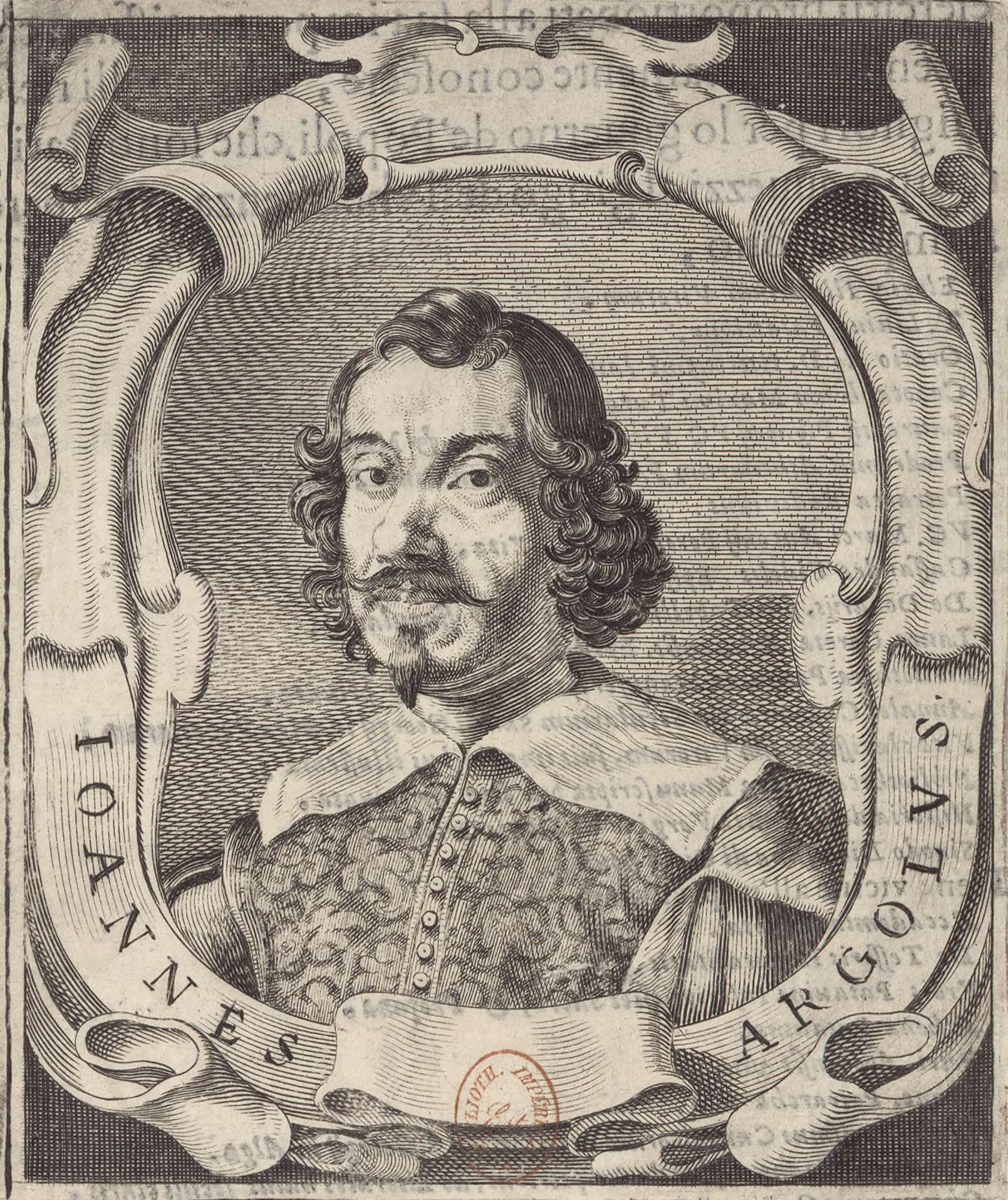
- Engraving of Giovanni Argoli, in "Le glorie degli Incogniti"
- Born: 1 July 1609; Tagliacozzo, Abruzzo, Italy
- Died: 1660 (aged 50–51)
- Occupations: Scholar; Poet; Civil Servant
- Parent: Andrea Argoli

Academic background
- Education: University of Padua
- Influences: Cicero; Onofrio Panvinio; Giambattista Marino

Academic work
- Era: Baroque
- Discipline: Classics, Classical archaeology
- Institutions: University of Bologna

Giovanni Argoli (1 July 1609 – 1660) was an Italian scholar and poet.

== Biography ==
Giovanni was the son of a well-known mathematician, Andrea Argoli, and was born at Tagliacozzo in the Abruzzi. At the age of fifteen he published a poem on the silkworm, Bombace e Seta (Rome, 1624). Two years later, emulous of the reputation Marino had just gained with his Adone, the young Argoli is said to have shut himself in an apartment, where he was visited only by servants bringing his food, and in seven months, at the age of seventeen, produced his Endimione (Rome, 1626). It met with a success apparently at least equal to the author's hopes. In 1632 he followed his father to Padua (where the latter was professor of mathematics), taking the doctorate in law. Yet he returned to literature, which he taught with success at Bologna until about 1640. Thereafter he again turned to the law, and held office in the government of Cervia and Lugo. In addition to his Italian verse, Argoli produced a number of poems in Latin, and several works on archaeology and philology. Among these last are notes on the De Ludis Circensibus of Onofrio Panvinio (Padua 1642). Giovanni Argoli was a member of the Umoristi, Gelati, and Incogniti academies.

== Works ==
- Idillio de la Bombace, e Seta. Trasformationi pastorali (in Italian). Roma: nella stamperia della Cam. Apost. 1624.
- L'Endimione poema di Giouanni Argolo all'illustrissimo, & eccellentissimo sign. don Filippo Colonna (in Italian) (1st ed.). Terni: nella stamperia di Tomasso Guerrieri. 1626.
- Iatro-laurea Gabrielis Naudaei Parisini a Leone Allatio inaugurata Graeco carmine; Latine reddita a Bartholomaeo Tortoletto et Joanne Argolo (in Latin). Romae: typis Iacobi Mascardi. 1633.
- Onuphrii Panvinii Veronensis De Ludis Circensibus Libri II - De Triumphis Liber unus - Quibus universa fere Romanorum veterum sacra, ritusque declarantur, ac figuris aeneis illustrantur, cum notis J. Argoli J.U.D. et additamento N. Pinelli (in Latin) (1st ed.). Padova: typis P. Frambotti. 1642.
- Reprinted in: Johann Georg Graevius (ed.), Thesaurus antiquitatum romanarum. Vol. IX. Leiden: Petrus van der Aa. 1699 (Online).
- Liceti, Fortunio (1640). "De lapide speculari veterum, de Gypso in Herculis Clypeo, et de impostura lapidis indici apud Thuanum". De Quaesitis per Epistolas a Claris Viris Responsa Fortunii Liceti: 112–14.
- Epistola ad Jacobum Philippum Tomasinum de templo Dianae Nemorensis, in: Giacomo Filippo Tomasini, De donariis ac tabellis votivis liber singularis, Padova, 1654 in-4 pag. 13 ff.; reprinted in: Johann Georg Graevius (ed.). Thesaurus antiquitatum romanarum (in Latin). Vol. XII. pp. 751 ff.

== Bibliography ==
- «Giovanni Argoli figlio d'Andrea». In : Le glorie de gli Incogniti: o vero, Gli huomini illustri dell'Accademia de' signori Incogniti di Venetia, In Venetia : appresso Francesco Valuasense stampator dell'Accademia, 1647, pp. 192–195 (on-line).
- Baillet, Adrien (1688). Enfans Célèbres. Paris: chez Antoine Dezallier. pp. 205–207.
- Papadopoli, Niccolò Comneno (1726). Historia Gymnasii Patavini. Vol. II. Venice: Sebastiano Coleti. p. 140.
- Toppi, Niccolò (1678). Biblioteca Napoletana. Naples: Antonio Bulifon. p. 114.
- Crescimbeni, Giovanni Mario. L'Istoria della volgar poesia. p. 159.
- Niceron, Jean-Pierre (1738). Memoires. Vol. XXXIX. Paris: Briasson. pp. 332–334.
- Asor-Rosa, Alberto (1962). "ARGOLI, Giovanni". Dizionario Biografico degli Italiani (in Italian). Vol. 4: Arconati–Bacaredda. Rome: Istituto dell'Enciclopedia Italiana. OCLC 883370.
- Joseph-François Michaud, Louis-Gabriel Michaud (1811). "Argoli (Giovanni)". Biographie universelle, ancienne et moderne (in French). Vol. 2. Paris: chez Michaud frères, libraires. pp. 417–418.
- Hutton, James (1935). The Greek Anthology in Italy to the Year 1800. Ithaca: Cornell University Press. p. 270.
- On his relations with Leone da Modena see Roth, Cecil, “Leone da Modena and the Christian Hebraist of his Age,” Jewish Studies in Memory of Israel Abrahams (New York 1927), pp. 397 ff.
- The Biographical Dictionary of the Society for the Diffusion of Useful Knowledge. Vol. 3. Longman, Brown, Green, and Longmans. 1843. pp. 371–372. This article incorporates text from this source, which is in the public domain.
