= Manoah Sibly =

English preacher (1757—1840)

Manoah Sibly (1757–1840), was a prominent Swedenborgian preacher, minister and astrologer, brother of Ebenezer Sibly.

== Biography ==
Manoah Sibly was born at Bristol on 20 August 1757. At a very early age he showed exceptional ability and power of application. On the death of his mother, when he was eleven, his father took him from school, and he thenceforth pursued his studies unaided. Before he was twenty he was able to teach Hebrew, Greek, Latin, and Syriac, as well as shorthand, and published A Critical Essay on the Hebrew text of Jeremiah 33.16. On 7 May 1780 he married an orphan named Sarah, two years older than himself, and opened a bookshop. The business was chiefly managed by his wife, while Sibly himself set up a school, studied books on alchemy and astronomy, and for a time was employed as a shorthand reporter in the law courts. In 1787 he embraced the tenets of the Swedenborgians, and soon became known among them as a preacher. He accepted the charge of a congregation in 1790, and, after several migrations, a permanent place of worship was built for him in Friars Street, near Ludgate Hill, in 1803. In 1797 he obtained a situation in the Bank of England, which gave him increased leisure for his ministerial duties. In 1815 he became principal of the chancery office at the Bank, and remained in that position until within a few months of his death. He died on 16 December 1840, and was buried in Bunhill Fields. By his wife Sarah, who died in 1829, he had eleven children, but only two daughters survived him.

== Works ==
Sibly, who had a large share in preparing the liturgy of the New church, was the author of:

- Twelve Sermons, London, 1796.
- Hymns and Spiritual Songs, 1802.
- A Defence of the New Church, London, 1815.
- A Supplement to Placidus de Titis, London, 1790.

He translated:

- Placidus de Titis' Astronomy and Elementary Philosophy, 1789.
- Placidus de Titis' Collection of Thirty Remarkable Nativities, 1789.

He also revised Whalley's translation of Ptolemy's Tetrabiblos, London, 1786, 4to.

== Sources ==
- Carlyle, Edward Irving (1897). "Dictionary of National Biography, 1885-1900/Sibly, Manoah" . In Lee, Sidney (ed.). Dictionary of National Biography. Vol. 52. London: Smith, Elder & Co.
