= Onofrio Panvinio =

Italian historian and antiquary (1529-1568)

Onofrio Panvinio OSA
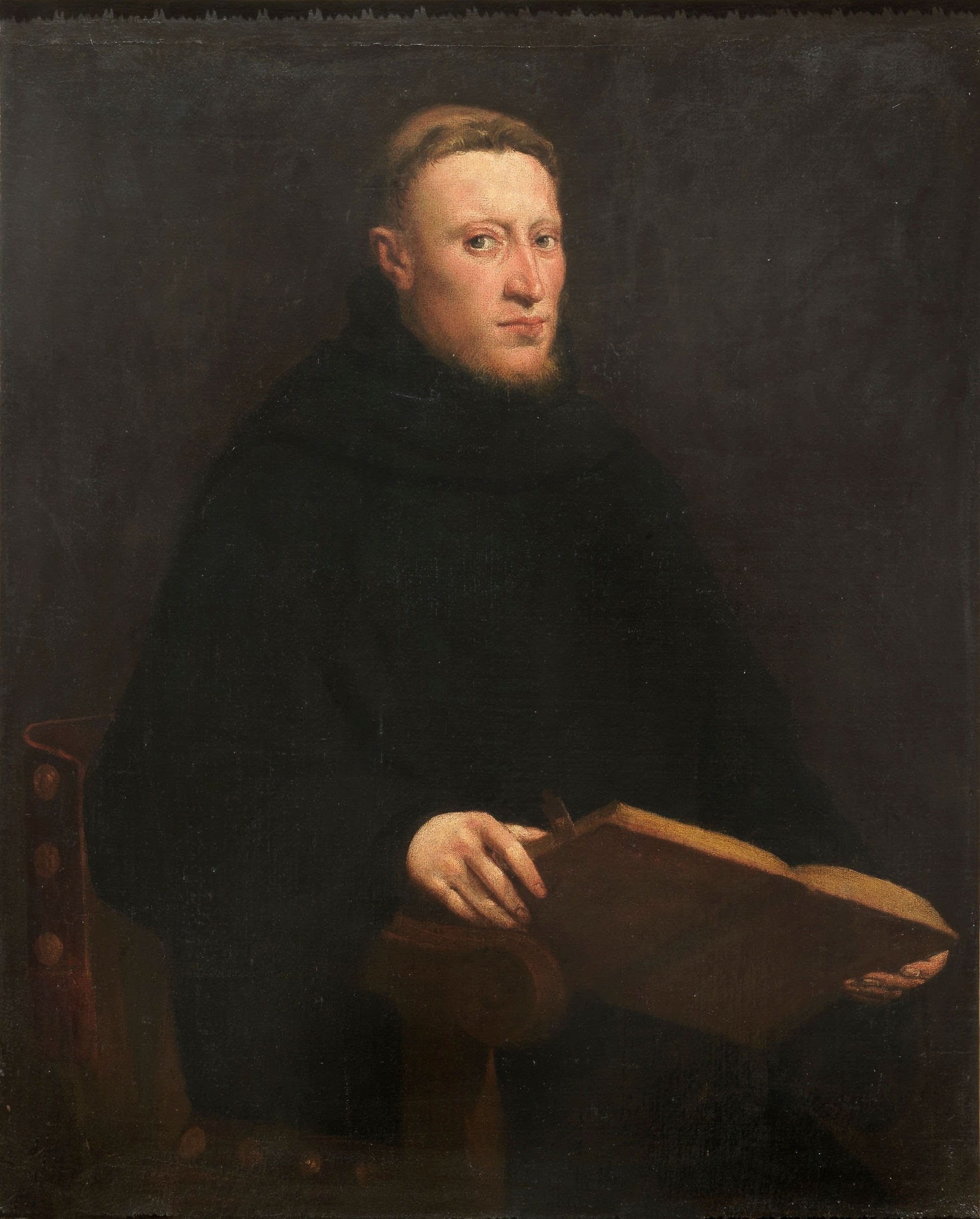
- Portrait of Onofrio Panvinio by Tintoretto, c. 1555

Personal life
- Born: Giacomo Panvino; 20 February 1530 Verona, Republic of Venice
- Died: 27 April 1568 (aged 38) Palermo, Kingdom of Sicily
- Resting place: Convent of S. Agostino, Palermo
- Parent(s): Onofrio Panvino and Bartolomea Campagna
- Known for: La Biblioteca Aprosiana (1673)
- Occupation: Monk, historian and antiquary

Religious life
- Religion: Roman Catholicism
- Order: Order of Saint Augustine
- Ordination: 1541

Onofrio Panvinio O.S.A. (Latin: Onuphrius Panvinius; 23 February 1529 – 27 April 1568) was an Italian Augustinian friar, historian and antiquary who was the librarian to Cardinal Alessandro Farnese.

== Life and work ==
Panvinio was born in Verona. At the age of eleven, he entered the order of Order of Saint Augustine and in 1539 he went to Rome and became fascinated by the city, whose topography, epigraphy, history ancient and medieval, writers and great papal families he would document through a spectacularly productive brief lifetime.

After graduating in Rome with a Bachelor of Arts in 1553 and teaching the novices of his order in Rome and Florence, in 1557, he obtained the degree of Doctor of Theology. He visited the libraries of Italy, pursuing historical research and went to Germany in 1559. Refusing the position of bishop, he accepted the more welcome office of corrector and reviser of the books of the Vatican Library in 1556. He died in Palermo while accompanying his friend and protector, Cardinal Farnese, to the Synod of Monreale, 1568.

He was recognized as one of the greatest church historians and archaeologists of his time. The scholarly printer Paulus Manutius called him antiquitatis helluo ("a glutton for antiquity"), and Julius Caesar Scaliger styled him pater omnis historiae ("father of all history").

His great archaeological map of ancient Rome was produced in 1565. About the same time, he began to collaborate with the French engraver Étienne Dupérac, who continued to provide illustrations for posthumous printings of Panvinio's works. Not all of his numerous historical, theological, archaeological, and liturgical works were published, even posthumously; some are preserved in manuscript in the Vatican Library.

His portrait by Tintoretto is in the Galleria Colonna.

== Publications ==
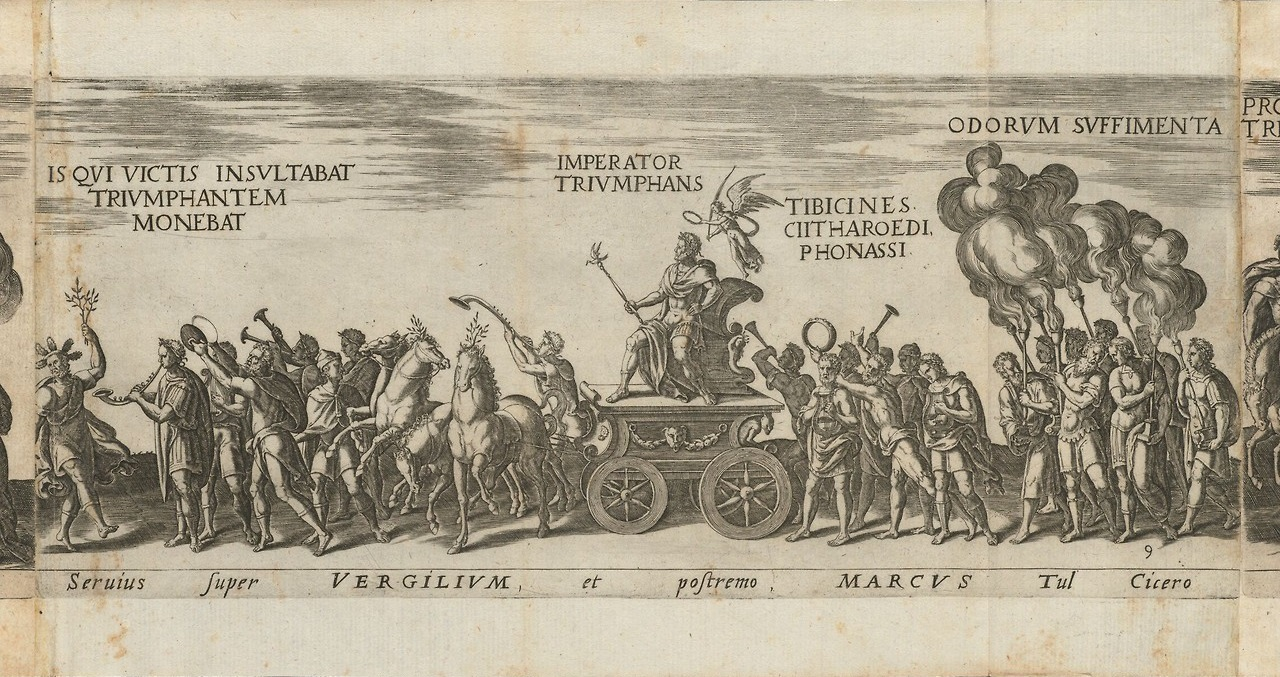
Section from Amplissimi ornatissimiq[ue] triumphi, 1619, by Onofrio Panvinio

- Fasti et triumphi Romanorum a Romulo usque ad Carolum V, (Giacomo Strada, Venice, 1557), "Fasti and triumphs of the Romans from Romulus to Charles V";
- A revised edition of Carolus Sigonius's Fasti consulares (Venice, 1558);
- De comitiis imperatoriis (Basel, 1558);
- De republica Romana (Venice, 1558); "On the Roman Republic";
- Epitome Romanorum pontificum (Venice, 1557); "Brief history of the Roman pontiffs";
- A revised edition of Bartolomeo Platina's De vitis pontificum (Venice); "On the lives of the popes";
- XXVII Pontif. Max. elogia et imagines (Rome, 1568); "Elogies and images of twenty-seven pontiffs";
- De sibyllis et carminibus sibyllinis (Venice, 1567) ("Of sibyls and Sibylline oracles");
- Chronicon ecclesiasticum a C. Julii Caesaris tempore usque ad imp. Maximilianum II (Cologne, 1568); "Ecclesiastical chronicle from the time of Julius Caesar to that of Emperor Maximilian";
- De episcopatibus, titulis, et diaconiis cardinalium (Venice, 1567);"of the bishoprics, tituli and diaconates of the cardinals";
- De ritu sepeliendi mortuos apud veteres Christianos (Cologne, 1568); "Of burial rites for the dead among the early Christians";
- De praecipuis urbis Romae santioribusque basilicis (Rome, 1570; Cologne, 1584);
- De primatu Petri et apostolicae selis potestate (Verona 1589): "Of the primacy of Peter and the power of the apostolic see";
- Libri X de varia Romanorum pontificum creatione (Venice, 1591);
- De bibliotheca pontificia vaticana (Tarragona, 1587); "On the pontifical Vatican Library";
- Augustiniani ordinis chronicon (Rome, 1550); "Chronicle of the Augustinian Order";
- De ludis circensibus (Venice, 1600); "On the circus games". A posthumous publication with etchings by Dupérac that date to the 1560s.
  - A second edition with Notes and Additions by Giovanni Argoli and Niccolò Pinelli was published at Padua, 1642, and reprinted in: Johann Georg Graevius, ed. (1699). Thesaurus antiquitatum romanarum. Vol. IX. Leida: Petrus van der Aa.
- Epitome antiquitatum romanarum (Rome, 1558);
- De antique Romanorum religione; "On the ancient religion of the Romans";

Karl Gersbach, OSA, has published numerous articles on aspects of Panvinio's career. Philip Jacks set his career in the context of early antiquarian investigations in The Antiquarian and the Myth of Antiquity: The Origins of Rome in Renaissance Thought. (Cambridge University Press) 1993. Jean-Louis Ferrary's study, Onofrio Panvinio et les antiquités romaines (Rome) 1996, focuses on Panvinio's works on Roman antiquity. For a modern biography of Panvinio, see Stefan Bauer, The Invention of Papal History: Onofrio Panvinio between Renaissance and Catholic Reform (Oxford University Press, 2020).
