= Stefan Bauer =

Lecturer the University of London

Stefan Bauer is lecturer in early modern History at King's College London. He was born in 1972. From 2019 to 2021, he taught at the University of Warwick and at Royal Holloway, University of London. From 2017 to 2018, he served as lecturer in early modern History at the University of York, following a two-year Marie Curie Fellowship also at York. In 2018, he completed his Habilitation at the University of Fribourg, Switzerland, obtaining the venia legendi in early modern History. Bauer received his PhD from the Warburg Institute, London, in 2004, after university studies in Aachen, Cambridge, and Siena. In 2023, Bauer was elected to the Academia Europaea.

Bauer has published widely on the religious and intellectual history of Europe. His first monograph on Jacob Burckhardt came out in 2001. It received numerous reviews, for instance by the classical scholar Hugh Lloyd-Jones in English Historical Review. The political scientist Wilhelm Hennis referred to it as "phenomenally learned" and the historian Peter Funke as "an outstanding achievement in the history of science". Bauer's study on the censorship of the Lives of Popes by Platina was published in 2006. The Sixteenth Century Journal noted that "Stefan Bauer has produced a scholarly tool essential for investigating the intersection of late-Renaissance ideas and practices with those of the Catholic Reformation". Renaissance Quarterly judged his work to be "an excellent book on an important humanist, his rewriting of papal history, and the reception and censorship of this highly influential and often scandalous work". In 2020, Bauer published a monograph with Oxford University Press. The Invention of Papal History: Onofrio Panvinio between Renaissance and Catholic Reform presents the biography of a crucial sixteenth-century author, Onofrio Panvinio, who changed the historical narrative about the history of the Catholic Church. It gives an account of the invention of a critical, source-based papal history. It also discusses the subsequent confessionalization and dogmatization of church history and reflects on the perpetually uneasy relationship between history and theology. This book has been judged favourably by critics. Daniel Woolf wrote in Marginalia Los Angeles Review of Books: "Bauer's volume appears in the Oxford-Warburg Studies, perhaps the most prestigious English-language book series concerned with Renaissance and early modern intellectual and cultural history. … The Invention of Papal History is an admirably readable and fascinating portrait, not only of its principal subject, Panvinio, but also of the culture of late Renaissance humanism at a time of profound instability in Europe".

Bauer is a Fellow both of the Royal Historical Society (FRHistS) and the Higher Education Academy (FHEA). His most recent research project, for which Bauer received funding from the European Commission, is entitled "History and Theology: the Creation of Disinterested Scholarship from Dogmatic Stalemate". Two exhibitions connected to this project, "The Art of Disagreeing Badly: Religious Dispute in Early Modern Europe", were opened at an interfaith event at the York Minster Library on 15 November 2016 and at the Middle Temple Library in London on 3 July 2017. Bauer is also the UK Chair of the Marie Curie Alumni Association.

In 2023, he was elected a member of the Academia Europaea.
