= Giovanni Battista Seni =

Govanni Battista Seni (c. 1600 – 1656), also known as Giovanni Battista Seno or Johann Baptist Zeno or Zenno or Senno, was a 17th-century Italian astrologer, who acted as the personal astrologer and advisor to Albrecht von Wallenstein, Commander-in-Chief of the Imperial armed forces during the Thirty Years' War.

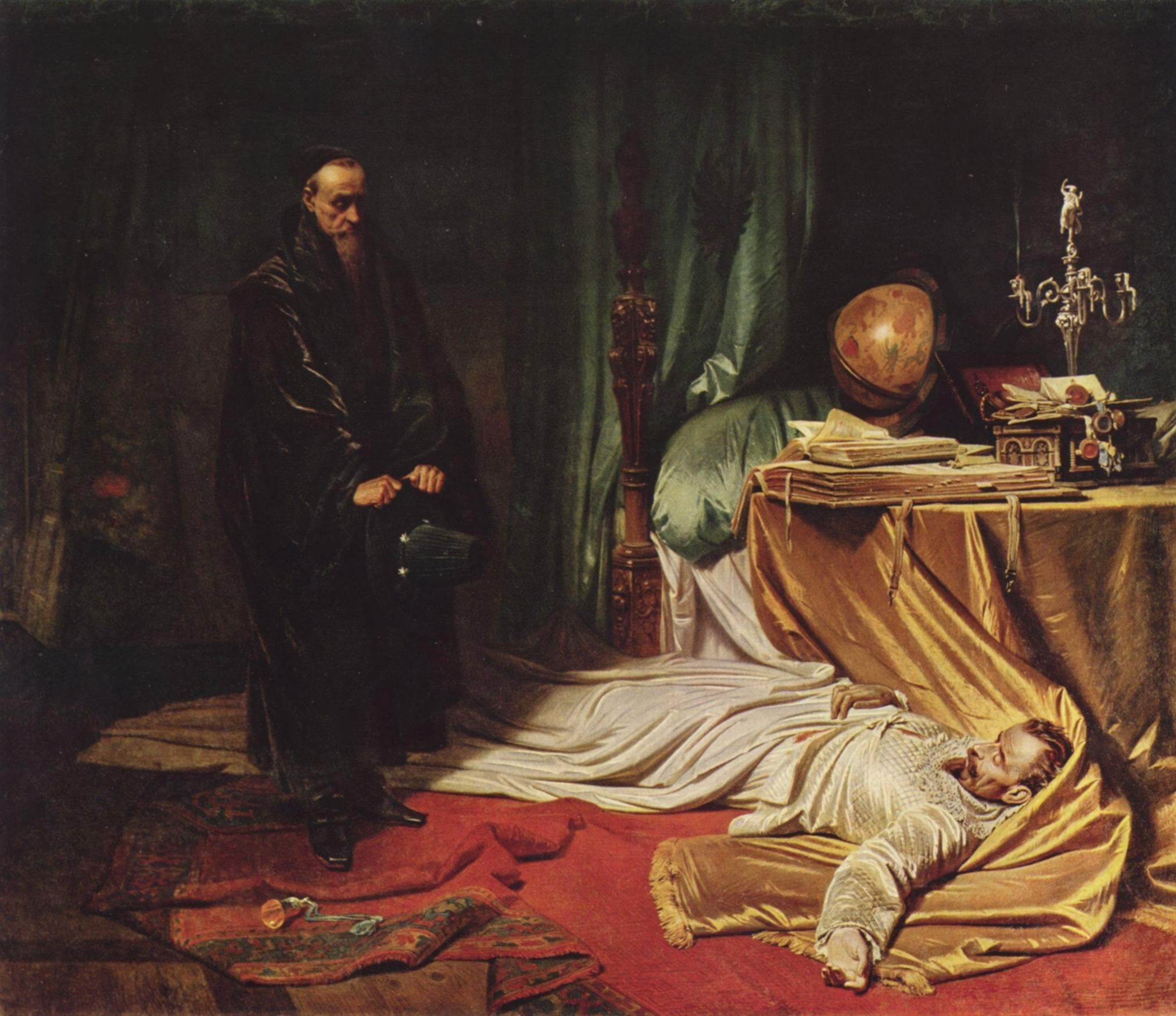
Seni depicted in The Death of Wallenstein. 1855 Painting by Karl Theodor von Piloty

== Biography ==
Seni, who went by several names, was educated at the University of Padua, possibly by the Physician and astrologer Andrea Argoli. The prominent Generalissimo Wallenstein, who had also been a student of Argoli fervently relieved on personal horoscopes and the opinions of astrologers for major decisions. Wallenstein was believed to have been introduced to Seni around 1630 by Ottavio Piccolomini, though it could have been through Wallenstein's other officer, Matthias Gallas. The astronomer Johannes Kepler, who had previously been employed by Wallenstein as an astrologer, may have employed Seni as his assistant, and Wallenstein may have been introduced to him through Kepler.

From 1630 until the General's death Seni was under Wallenstein's employ creating astrological charts and advising the general. Though depicted in Schiller's Wallenstein drama trilogy and in other art as a loyal servant who tried to warn Wallenstein in vain of his impending fate, many historians suspect him of playing a role in Wallenstein's assassination, acting as a double agent for Gallas, or possibly Piccolomini.

On March 11, 1634, three weeks after Wallenstein's murder, Seni was arrested and imprisoned by the Imperial court for his possible role in Wallenstein's suspected treason. He was freed by the beginning of 1635, and all but disappears from the historical record other than an incident on April 1, 1643 when Seni was stabbed by the Polish Ambassador at the Stephansplatz after reportedly insulting him. Seni supposedly recovered and is believed to have died in Genoa in 1656.
