= Ebenezer Sibly =

British astrologer & occultist (1751–c.1799)

Ebenezer Sibly (1751 – c. 1799) was an English physician, astrologer and writer on the occult.

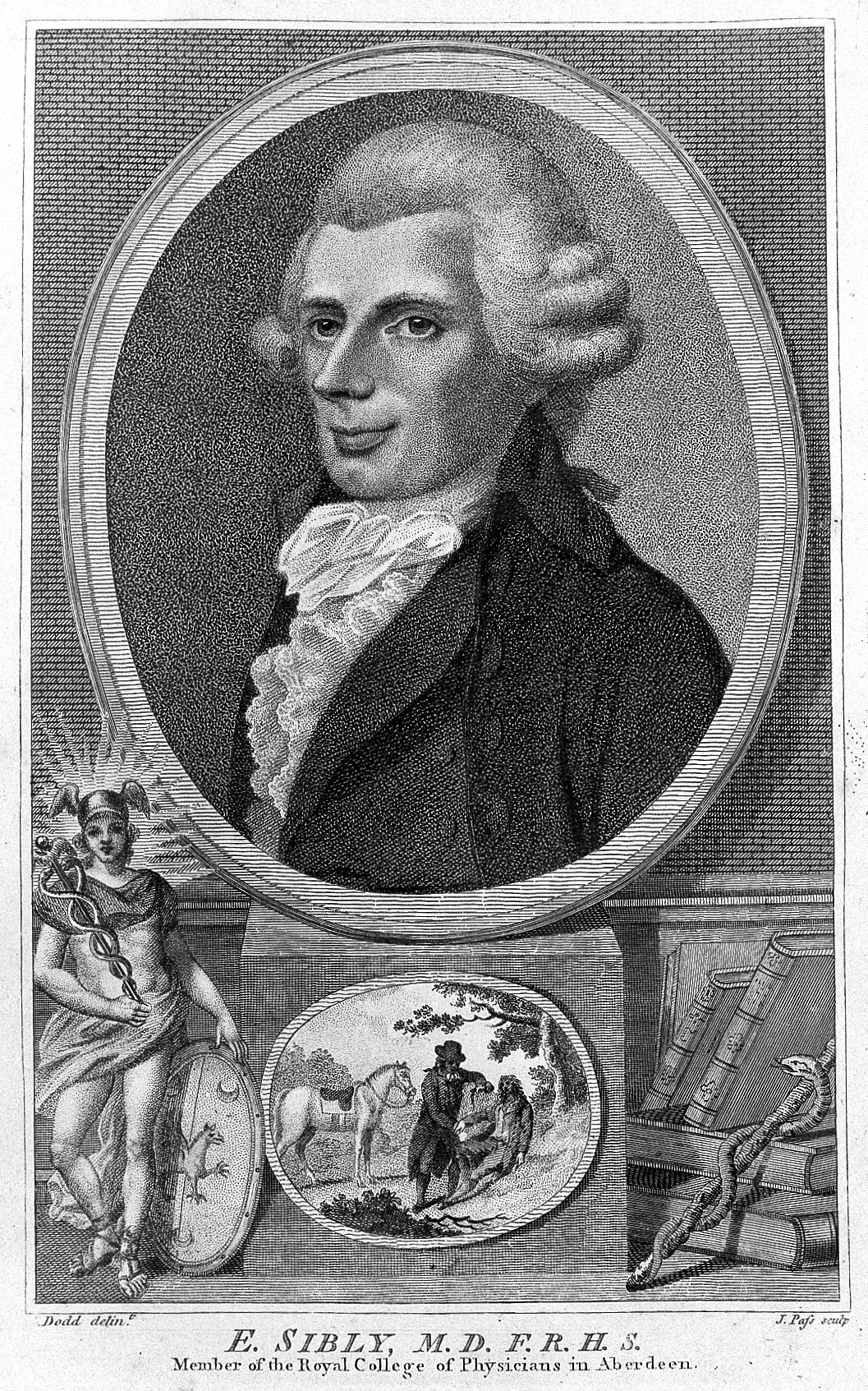
Ebenezer Sibly

== Life ==
He was the son of Edmund Sibly and Mary Larkholm, born in the parish of Cripplegate ward, London. He was the brother of Manoah Sibly. Early on he devoted himself to medicine and astrology. He studied surgery in London.

In 1785 he was working as an astrologer in Bristol; and by about 1788 had moved to London. In 1789 he became the first master of the Lodge of Joppa #188, one of the founding masonic lodges under the Ancient Grand Lodge of England. In 1790 he was temporarily in Ipswich, supporting Sir John Hadley D'Oyly, the Whig member, at the general election. On 20 April 1792 he graduated M.D. from King's College, Aberdeen.

Sibly was a deputy to Thomas Dunckerley in the founding of the Royal Ark Mariners, and recognized Thomas Parkyns, 1st Baron Rancliffe as the next Grand Commander after Dunckerley's death.

As a student of medicine, he became interested in the theories on animal magnetism by Anton Mesmer, joining Mesmer's Harmonic Philosophical School, and later also theosophy.

Sibly died in London around 1799.

== Works ==
Sibly is celebrated for the natal horoscope he cast of the United States of America, published in 1787 and is still cited.

=== Translations ===
Ebenezer Sibly used an eclectic mixture of early modern esoteric works. His brother Manoah Sibly (1757–1840) was a linguist, as well as a Swedenborgian preacher. Under Manoah's name appeared texts including a revision of John Whalley's translation of the Tetrabiblos, and a translation of Placidus de Titis; as an astrologer, Ebenezer is said to have used the Placidian system of houses; as a student of alchemy, he translated Bernard of Treviso (the fountain allegory). It has been said that experts of the time would have seen that Sibly was not very discriminating about the sources he chose, and drew on unpublished translations that he had borrowed. He knew the Book of Enoch via Charles Rainsford.

=== The Complete Illustration ===
Sibly published the New and Complete Illustration of the Celestial Science of Astrology in four volumes, from 1784. He had completed it by the time he moved to London. The work, which had later editions under various titles, gave details of magical procedure, and an account of the spirit world derived from Reginald Scot, in the 1665 edition of Discoverie of Witchcraft. Revised editions appeared posthumously as Astrology, A New and Complete Illustration of the Occult Sciences by Ebenezer Sibly, M.D. F.R.H.S., Embellished with Curious Copper-Plates, London (1806), and The New and Complete Illustration of the Celestial Science of Astrology (1817).

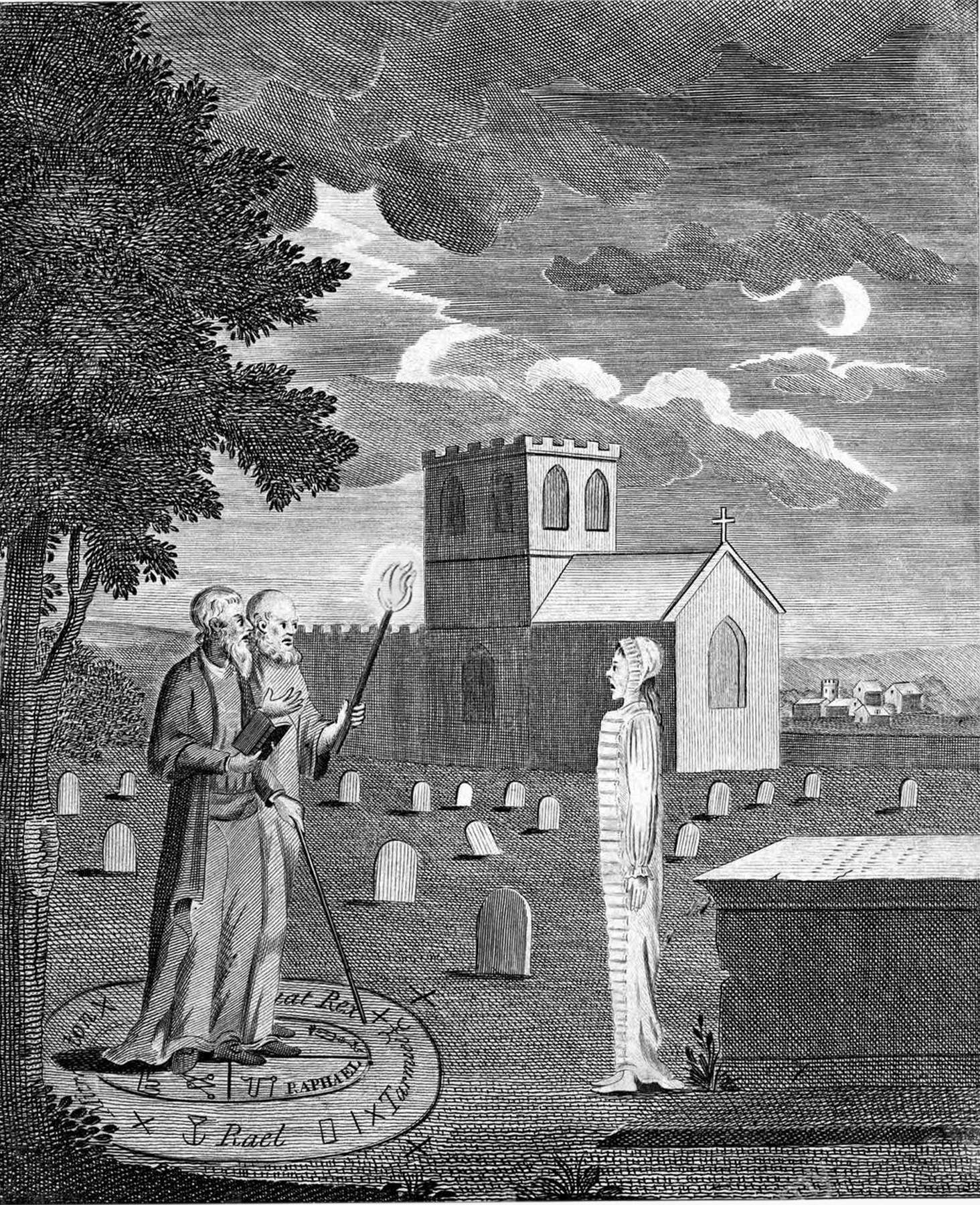
Illustration from the 1806 edition of Sibly's Astrology, original drawing, Sibly, engraving, John Ames

=== Other works ===
Sibly published A Key to Physic, and the Occult Sciences, in 1792.

Sibly wrote a book called Universal System of Natural History in 1794. In the book, in a form of environmental monogenism, he claimed that the White Race was the first on earth:

“We must consider white as the stock whence all others have sprung, Adam and Eve and all their posterity, till the time of the deluge were white; in the first age of the world no black nation was to be found on the face of the earth.”

Sibly believed that humans had not reached Africa until after the dispersal from the Tower of Babel, that the continent's first inhabitants had been white, and that Africans had become dark only as a result of climate.

The original version of Culpeper's English Physician and Complete Herbal was published in 1652 without illustrations. In 1790 an illustrated version of the book was produced with drawings done by Sibly.

Illustrations from Ebenezer Sibly's Astrology
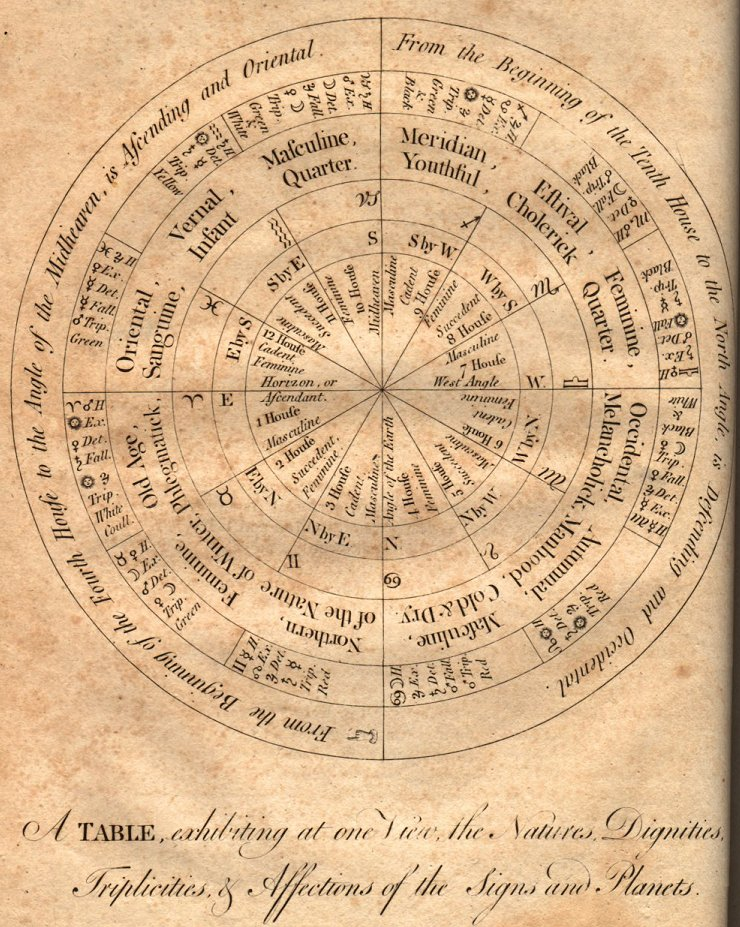
A table showing the zodiacal signs and their gender, triplicities, and quadruplicities, and essential dignities; houses and their gender and locational status.

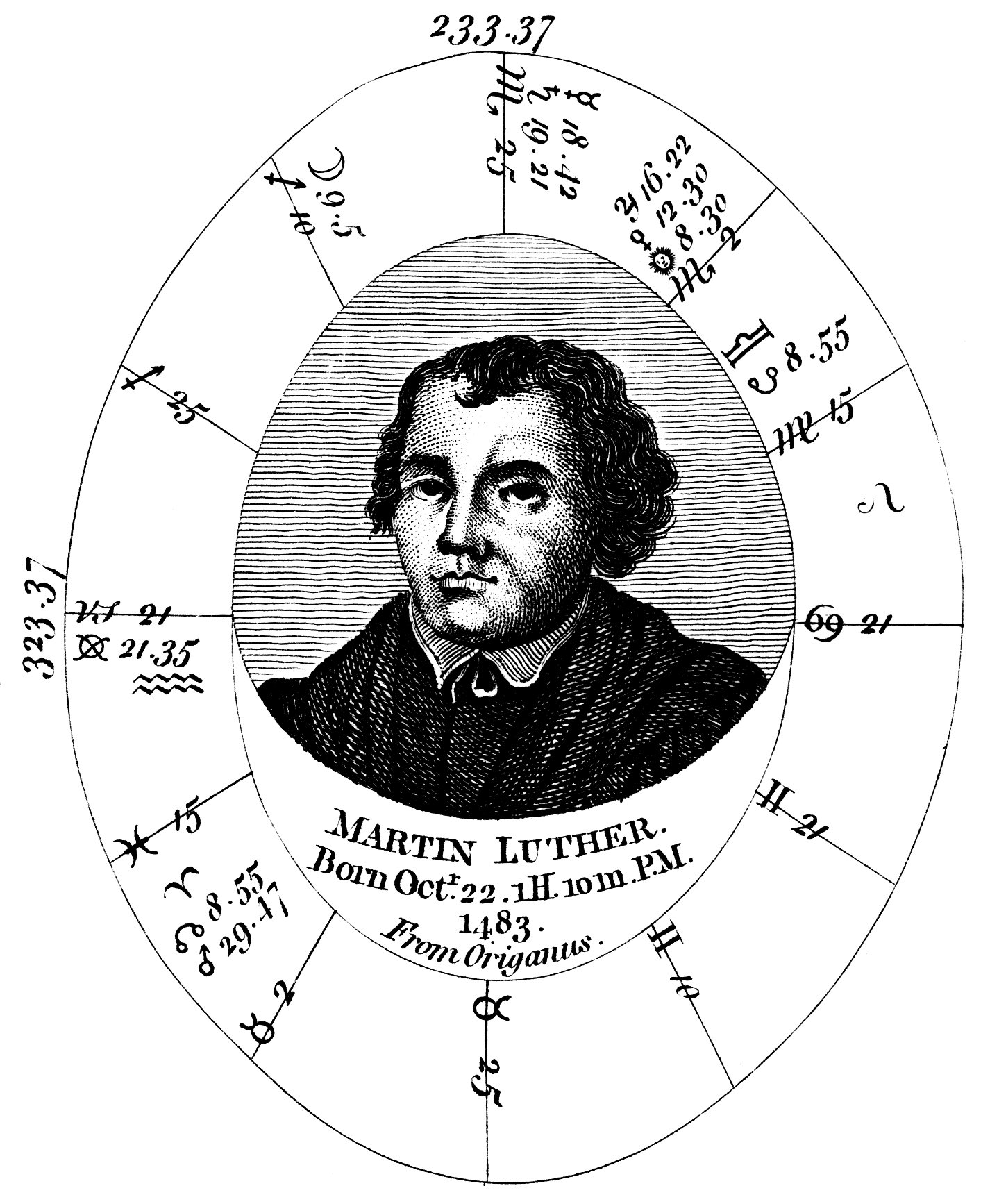
Horoscope drawn for the birth of Martin Luther.

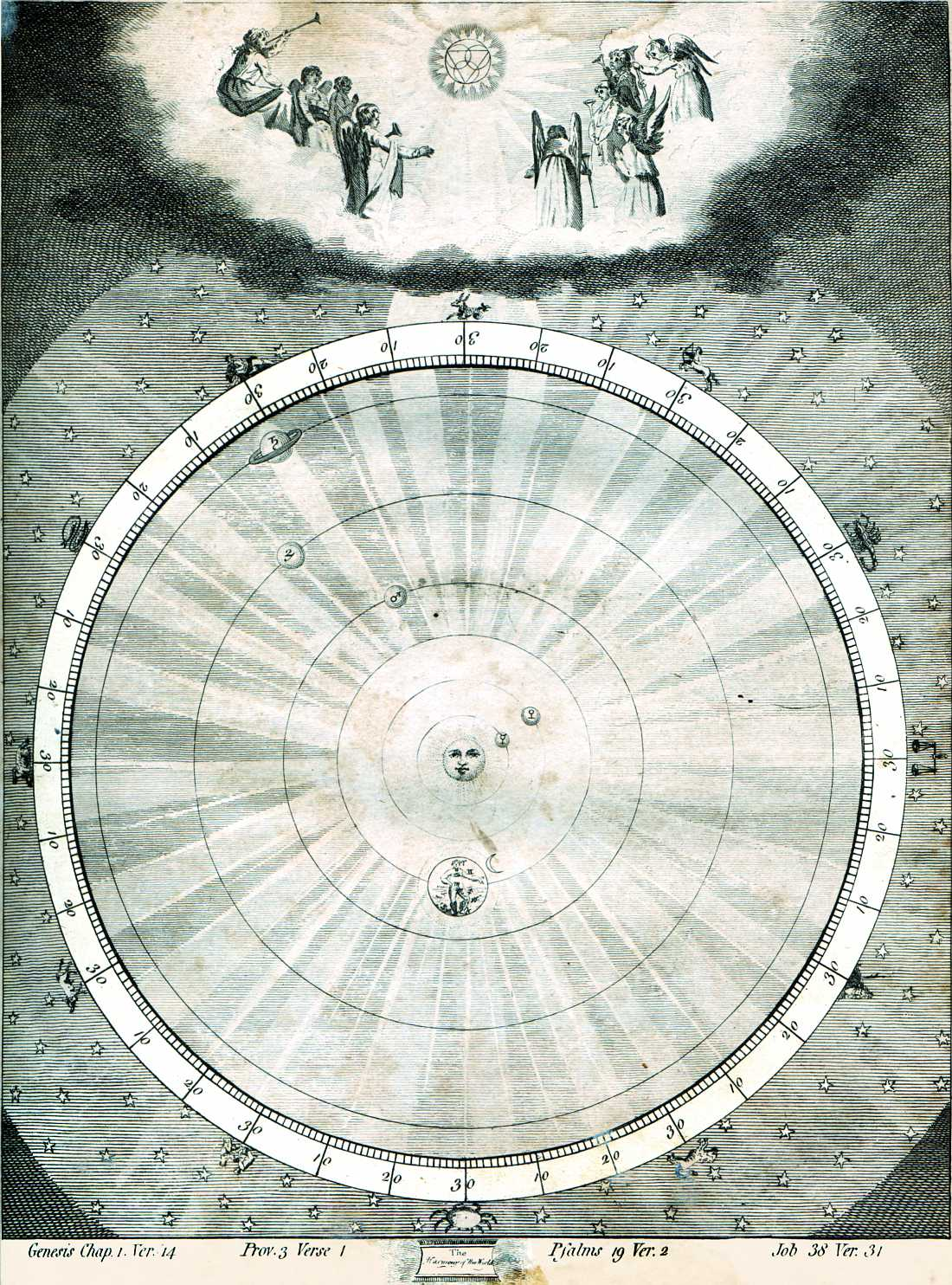
A heliocentric universe showing the planets' correct distances and the zodiacal signs with Aries beginning at the horizon and the other signs following in correct order.

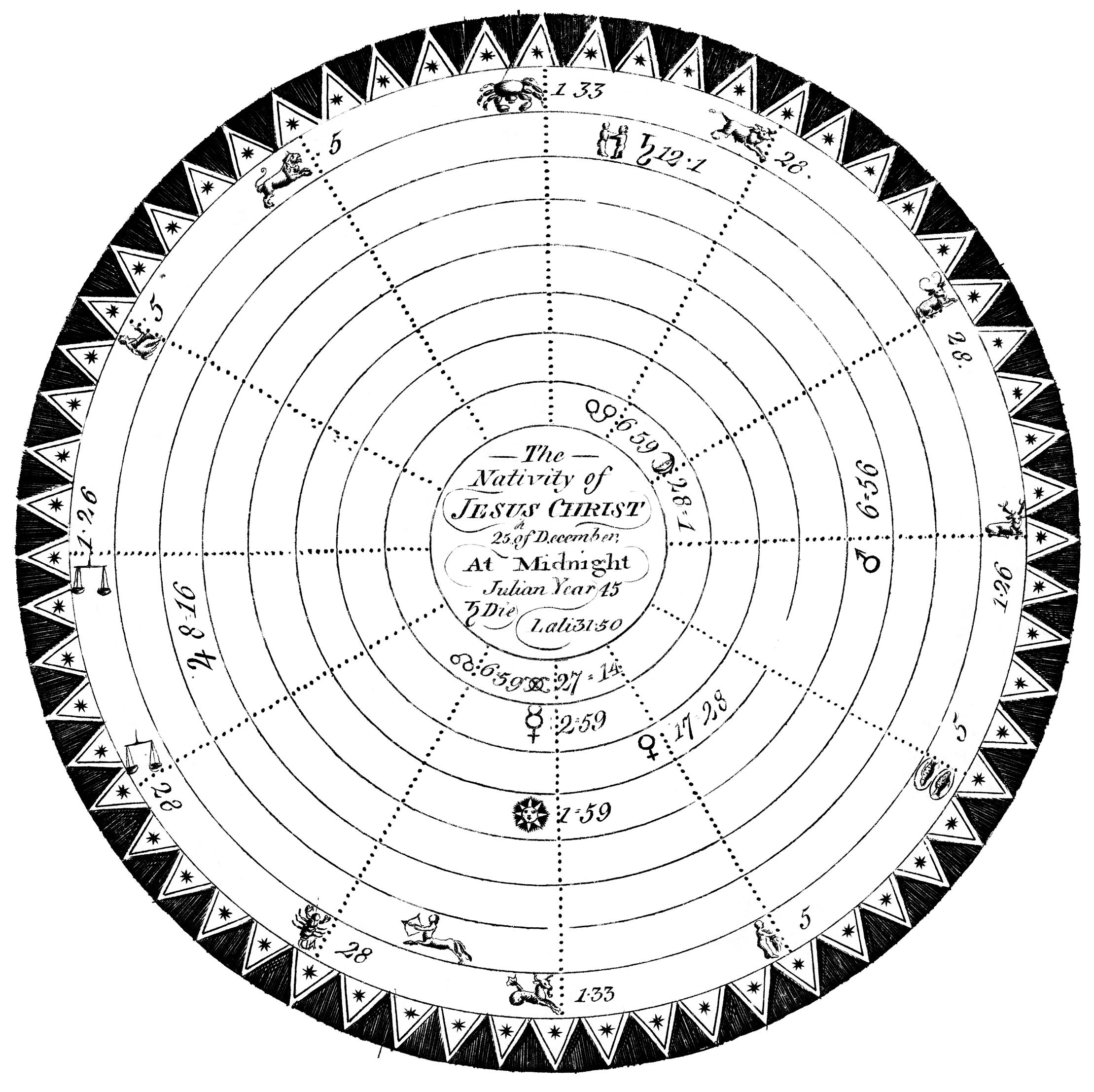
Horoscope drawn for the speculated birth time of Jesus Christ, midnight, 25 December, in the Julian year 45.
