= John Ames (printmaker) =

John Ames (fl. 1777 - 1792) was a Bristol-based printmaker. He produced a number of portraits including those of the Methodist ministers, James Rouquet and John Henderson as well as the Quaker doctor, John Till Adams. William Young Ottley, who only had a copy of the Rouquet portrait, suggests he may have been an amateur. He also produced a number of engravings for Ebenezer Sibly, a protégé of Till Adams.

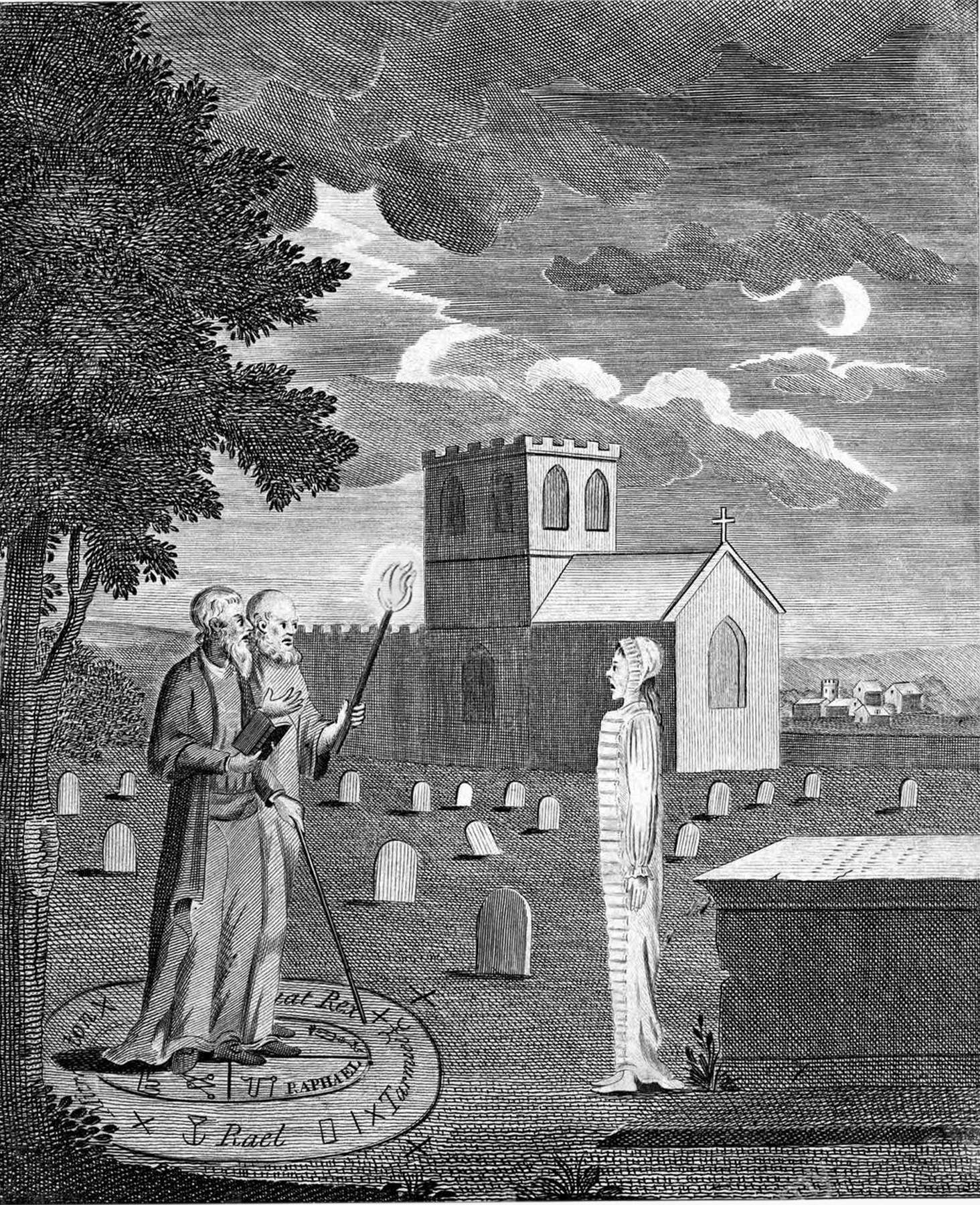
John Dee and Edward Kelley, from a drawing by Ebenezer Sibly, 1790
