= Andrea Argoli =

Italian mathematician and astronomer (1570–1657)

Doctor Andrea Argoli
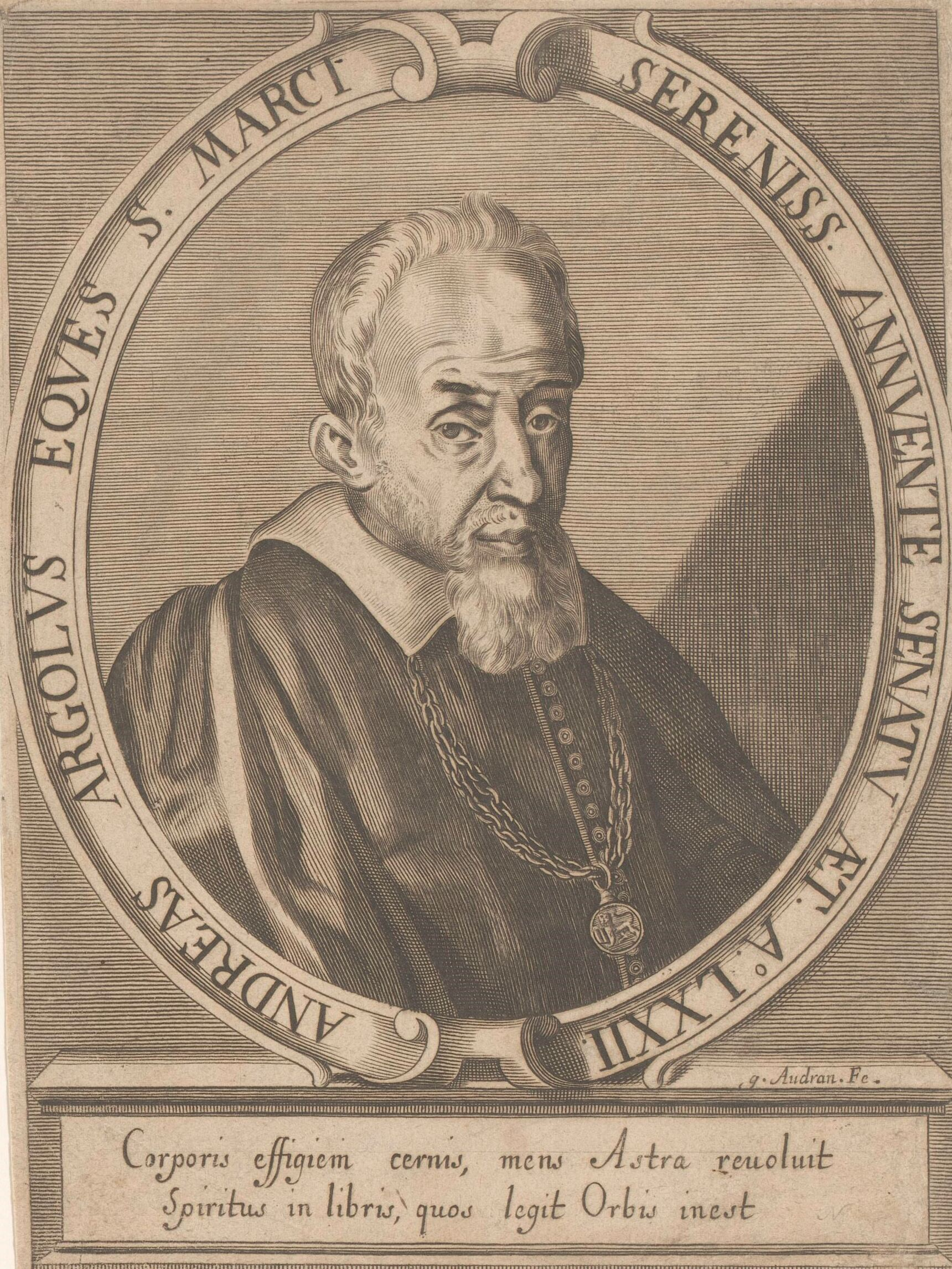
- Portrait of Andrea Argoli by Germain Audran
- Born: March 15, 1570; Tagliacozzo, Papal States
- Died: 27 September 1657 (aged 87); Padua, Republic of Venice
- Occupations: Mathematician, astronomer, astrologer
- Known for: astronomical ephemerides, astrological prediction
- Children: Giovanni Argoli
- Parent(s): Ottavio Argoli and Caterina Argoli (née Mati)

Academic background
- Influences: Aristotle; Ptolemy; Martianus Capella; Tycho Brahe; Galileo Galilei

Academic work
- Discipline: Astronomy, Astrology
- Sub-discipline: Judicial astrology
- Institutions: Sapienza University of Rome; University of Padua
- Notable students: Albrecht von Wallenstein; Placidus de Titis; Giovanni Battista Seni
- Influenced: William Lilly; Vincent Wing

Andrea Argoli (Latin: Andreas Argolus; 15 March 1570 – 27 September 1657), born in Tagliacozzo, was an Italian mathematician, astronomer and astrologer. He was one of the most important 17th-century makers of ephemerides, which gave the positions of astronomical objects in the sky at a given time or times.

He was professor of mathematics at the University of Rome La Sapienza, from 1622 to 1627, and then the University of Padua 1632 to 1657. His pupils may have included Placido Titi and Giovanni Battista Seni, astrologer to Wallenstein.

== Biography ==
Andrea Argoli was born at Tagliacozzo in the Abruzzi in 1570. His father, Ottavio, was a lawyer. He studied medicine, mathematics, and astronomy at Naples and taught mathematics at the Sapienza University of Rome from 1622 to 1627. Having lost his post because of his involvement with astrology, he was obliged to retire to Venice. The Venetian Senate recognizing his learning appointed him to the Chair of Mathematics at Padua in 1632. In 1638, the Venetian Government conferred upon him the title of Knight of the Order of Saint Mark. After recovering from grave illness in 1646, Argoli wore the Franciscan habit for the rest of his life in gratitude. Argoli was a member of the Accademia Galileiana in Padua and of the Accademia degli Incogniti in Venice.

A versatile scholar, Argoli showed an interest in medicine. He was one of the first scholars in Italy to acclaim Harvey's discovery of blood circulation. The Pandosion sphaericum of 1644, a large-scale geocentric cosmography, includes a remarkable extract from Harvey's De motu cordis and discusses the theories put forth by Walaeus in his Epistolae duae de motu chyli.

== Legacy ==
Argoli's extensive astronomical ephemerides, based first on the Prutenic Tables (1620-1640) and later on, his own tables (1630-1700), which were based on the observations of Tycho Brahe, gave permanence to his reputation. Delambre has bestowed three pages upon Argoli, who, it appears, was well informed about new scientific discoveries, and is aptly described as “one of those laborious men who wrote long works for the use of astronomers, and particularly of those who were also astrologers.” Argoli's ephemerides were used as the basis of Ferdinand Verbiest's calendars.

Argoli proposed a geo-heliocentric system where Mercury and Venus revolve around on the Sun while the other planets (and the Sun) revolve around the Earth. This system is identical to that of Martianus Capella, but Argoli proposed also that the Earth is rotating on its own axis.

As a mathematician, Argoli is best remembered for his discovery that logarithms facilitate easy processes, but increase the labor of difficult ones.

== Works ==
- Tabulæ Primi Mobilis, Rome, 1610.
- The Ephemerides were published as follows: from 1621 to 1640, at Rome in 1621; from 1631 to 1680, at Padua in 1638; from 1648 to 1700, at Rome in 1647. Those from 1661 to 1700 were reprinted at Lyons as late as 1677.
- Secundorum Mobilium Tabulæ, Padua, 1634.
- Pandosium Sphæricum, Padua, 1644.
  - Pandosion sphaericum (in Latin). Padua: Paolo Frambotto. 1653.
- Exactissimae caelestium motuum ephemerides ad longitudinem almae urbis et Tychonis Brahe hypotheses, ac deductas e caelo accurate observationes ab anno 1641 ad annum 1700 (in Latin). Padua: Paolo Frambotto. 1648.
- De Diebus Criticis, Padua, 1652; with various smaller works and second editions (all in 4º). a list of which is in Lalande's Bibliographie Astronomique.
- Ptolemaeus parvus (in Latin). Lyon: Joseph Vilort & Pierre Vilort. 1652.
- Brevis dissertatio de cometa (in Latin). Padua: Paolo Frambotto. 1653.
