= Sorbo, Tagliacozzo =

Coordinates: 42°04′28″N 13°18′57″E

Sorbo
- Frazione
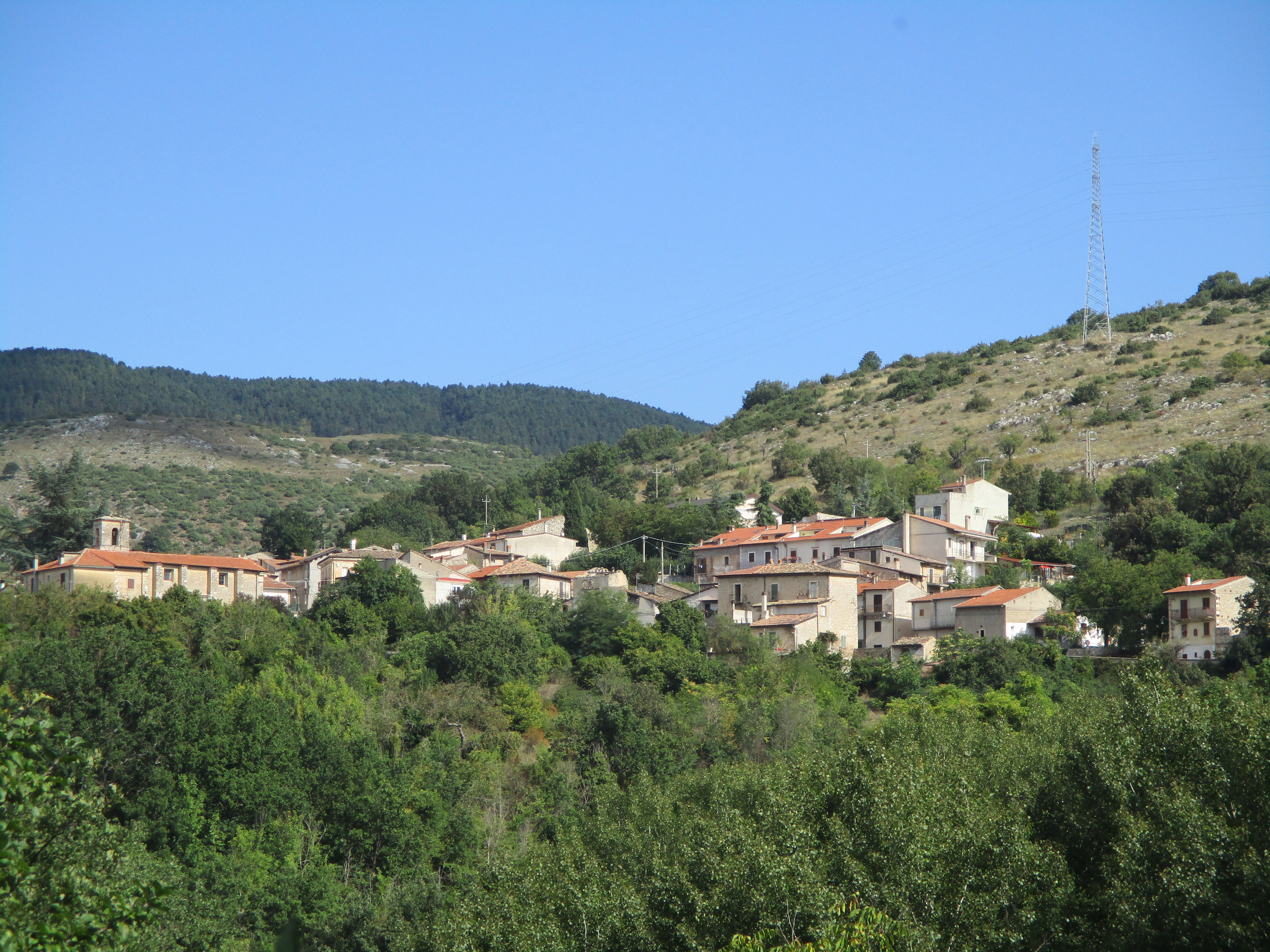
- Interactive map of Sorbo
- Country: Italy
- Region: Abruzzo
- Province: L'Aquila
- Commune: Tagliacozzo
- Time zone: UTC+1 (CET)
  - Summer (DST): UTC+2 (CEST)

Sorbo is a frazione of Tagliacozzo, in the Province of L'Aquila in the Abruzzo, region of Italy. It is located 45 miles (72 kilometres) north east of Rome. It is known for its medieval church, Santa Maria delle Grazie in Sorbo di Tagliacozzo, first mentioned in a Papal Bull by Pope Clement III in 1188. It has fine pilasters, a pediment, an oculus, and columns on its façade; inside is a painting of the Madonna.
