= Poggio Filippo =

Coordinates: 42°05′05″N 13°18′20″E

- Frazione
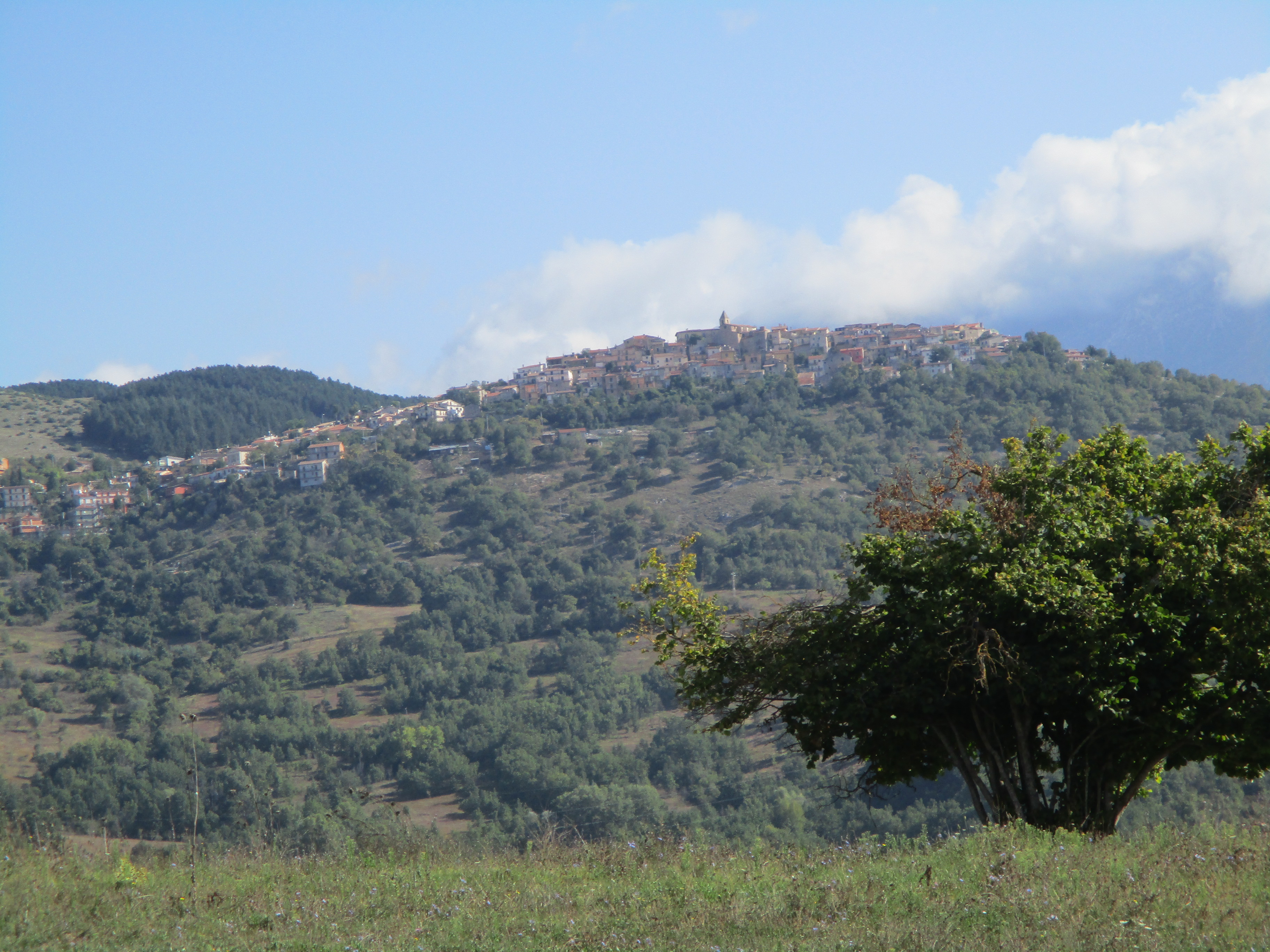
- Interactive map of Poggio Filippo
- Country: Italy
- Region: Abruzzo
- Province: L'Aquila
- Commune: Tagliacozzo
- Time zone: UTC+1 (CET)
  - Summer (DST): UTC+2 (CEST)

Poggio Filippo is a frazione of Tagliacozzo in the Province of L'Aquila in the Abruzzo, region of Italy. The local church is Parrocchia Sant'Ansuino of Poggio Filippo.
