= Altolaterra =

Coordinates: 42°04′03″N 13°14′41″E

- Quarter
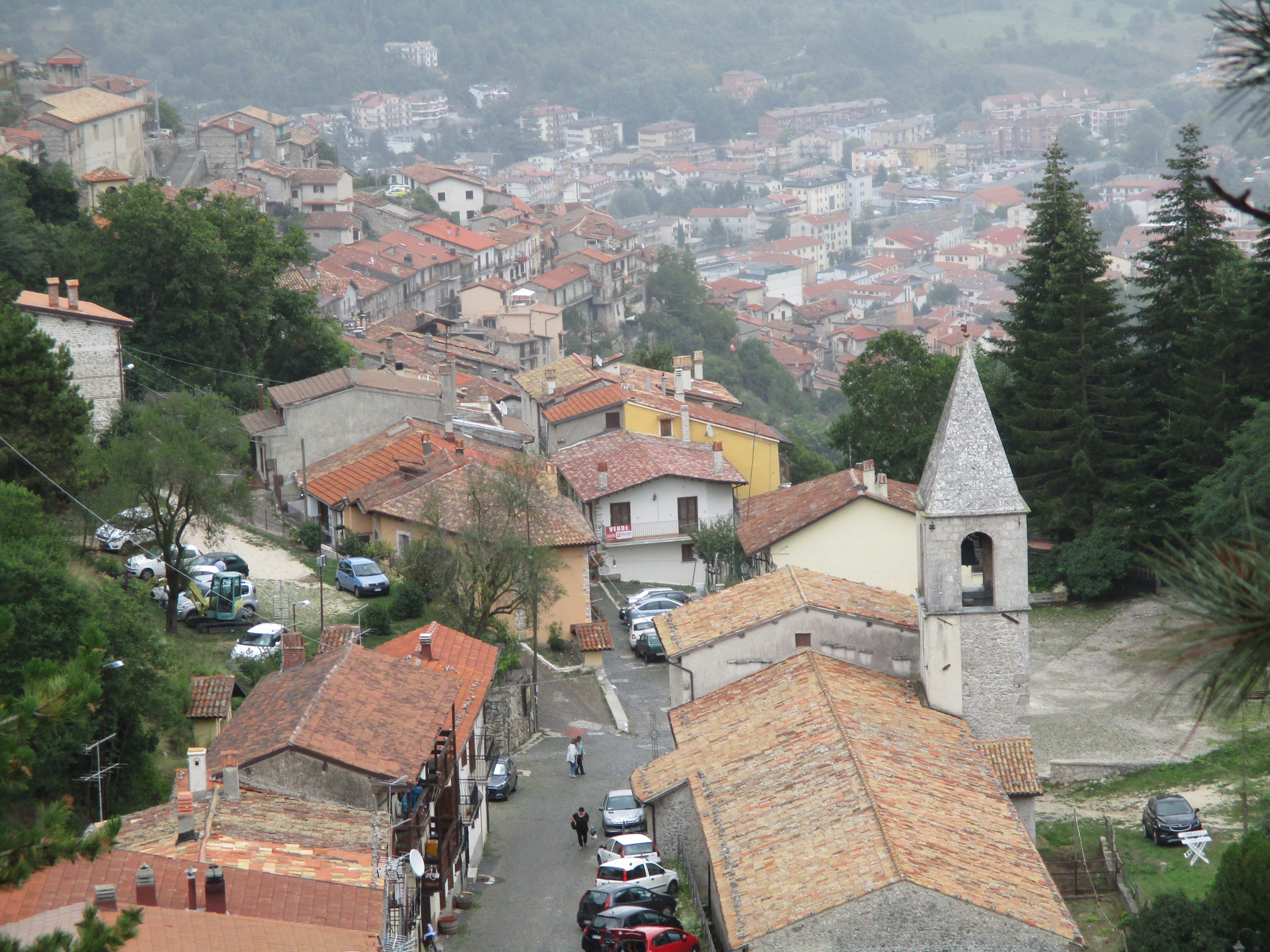
- Tagliacozzo view
- Interactive map of Altolaterra
- Country: Italy
- Region: Abruzzo
- Province: L'Aquila
- Commune: Tagliacozzo
- Time zone: UTC+1 (CET)
  - Summer (DST): UTC+2 (CEST)

Altolaterra (Marsicano: 'Nzulatera) is a quarter of Tagliacozzo in the Province of L'Aquila in the Abruzzo region of Italy.
