= Placidus de Titis =

Italian mathematician and astronomer (1603–1668)

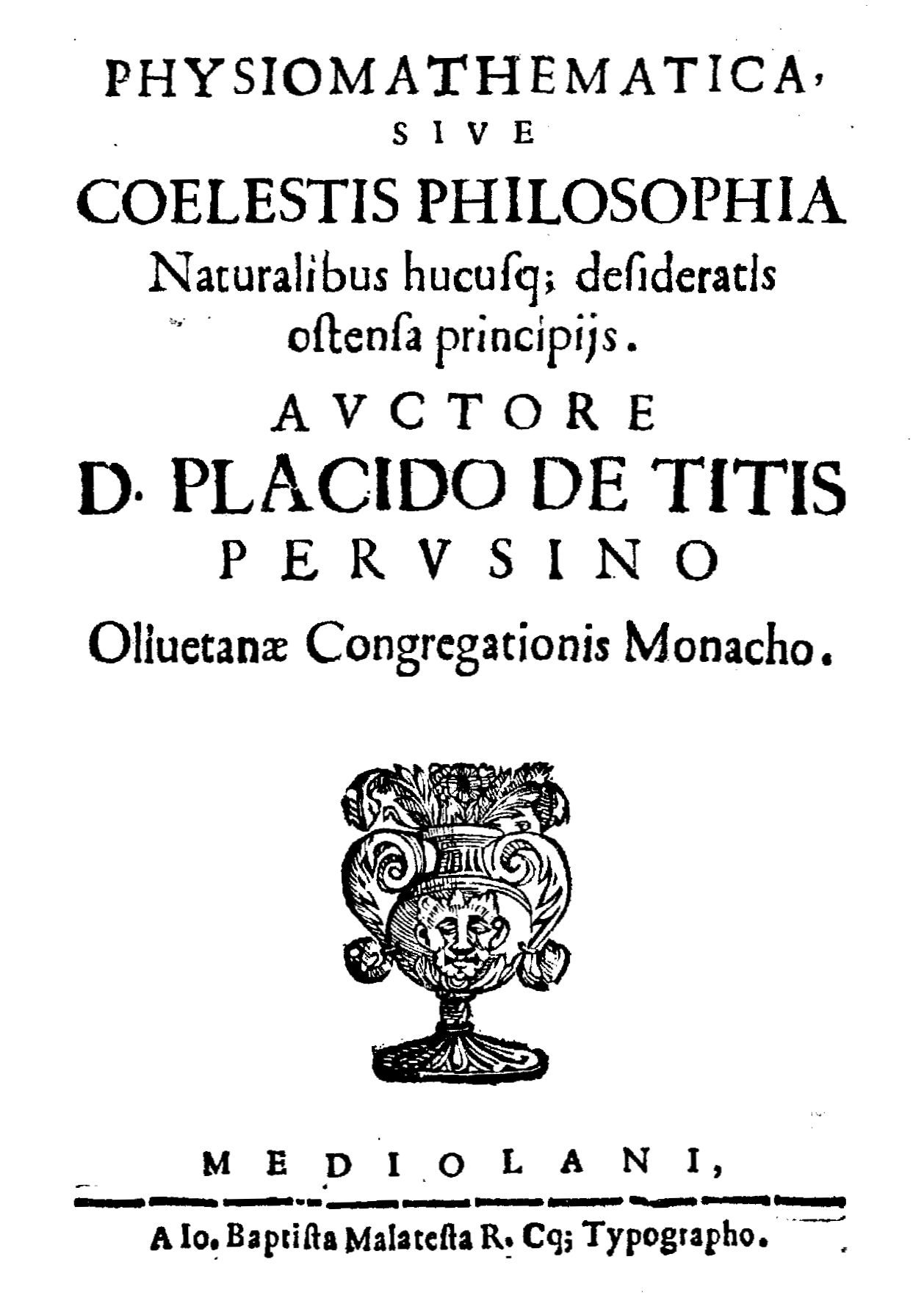
- Physiomathematica, sive Coelestis philosophia naturalibus hucusque desideratis ostensa principijs, 1650
- Born: 25 December 1603; Perugia, Umbria, Italy
- Died: 1668 (aged 64–65); Pavia, Lombardy, Italy
- Other name: Didacus Prittus Pelusiensis
- Occupations: Monk, mathematician, astronomer, astrologer
- Known for: Placidian system
- Parent(s): Tiberio Titi and Cecilia Titi

Academic background
- Education: University of Padua
- Influences: Aristotle; Ptolemy; Philip van Lansberg; Andrea Argoli

Academic work
- Institutions: University of Pavia
- Notable students: Vincenzo Renieri; Girolamo Vitali
- Influenced: John Partridge; Ebenezer Sibly

Placidus de Titis (also de Titus, Latinization of Placido de Titi, pseudonym Didacus Prittus Pelusiensis; 1603–1668) was an Olivetan monk and professor of mathematics, physics and astronomy at the University of Pavia from 1657 until his death. Placidus popularized the system of astrological houses now known as the "Placidian system", current in modern astrology. He did not invent the method; it is acknowledged by the 12th century Hebrew astrologer Abraham Ibn Ezra as the system employed by Ptolemy, an attribution that was accepted by Placidus.

== Biography ==
Placidus was born in Perugia, into the Titi noble family. His father died early, and he was looked after by his mother Cecilia. He studied at the University of Padua where his uncle Girolamo de Titi was professor of theology. One of his teachers was the astronomer Andrea Argoli. The Duchy of Milan at the time was owned by Habsburg Spain, administered by Archduke Leopold Wilhelm of Austria. The Archduke showed strong interest in science, especially occult sciences of alchemy and astrology, and Placidus dedicated his astrological house tables to him. In 1657 he was appointed professor of mathematics at the University of Pavia, a position he held for the rest of his life. Like his contemporary Jean-Baptiste Morin, Placidus opposed the copernican theory and retained a geocentric perspective, although there have been suggestions that he might have been a closet Copernican.

He died in Pavia in 1668.

English translations of Placidus' Primum Mobile were published by Manoah Sibly (1789) and John Cooper (1814).

== Works ==
- De motibus directionum coelestium mobilium (1641).
- Physiomathematica sive coelestis philosophia (1650), Placidus' magnum opus, first published as Quaestionum physiomathematicarum libri tres, under the pseudonym of Didacus Prittus Pelusiensis, second edition by C. Francobacci und A. Scirota (pseudonyms of two of Placidus' students, F. Brunacci and F. M. Onorati).
- Physiomathematica, sive Coelestis philosophia naturalibus hucusque desideratis ostensa principijs (in Latin). Milano: Giovanni Battista Malatesta. 1650.
- Nuncius astronomicus (1654).
- Il corriere astronomico (1656).
- Tabulae primi mobilis cum thesibus et canonibus (1657).
- Commentaria in Ptolemaeum de siderum judiciis (1658).
- De siderum judiciis, 2 vols. (1660, 1665).
- Ephemeridum caelestium motuum (in Latin). Pavia: Giovanni Ghidini. 1661.
- De diebus decretoriis et aegrorum decubitu, 2 vols. (1661, 1665).
- Ephemerides coelestium motuum (1661-1665).
- Tocco di paragone (in Italian). Pavia: Giovanni Andrea Magri. 1665.
- Tocco di paragone onde evidentemente appare che l’astrologia nelle parti concesse da S. Chiesa è vera scienza, naturale, nobile, et utile quanto la filosofia (1666), in defense of astrology as a natural science.
- Ephemeridum caelestium motuum (in Latin). Pavia: Giovanni Ghidini. 1666.
