= Tagliacozzo =

Town in Abruzzo, Italy

Tagliacozzo Tajacózzo (Neapolitan)
- Comune
- Comune di Tagliacozzo
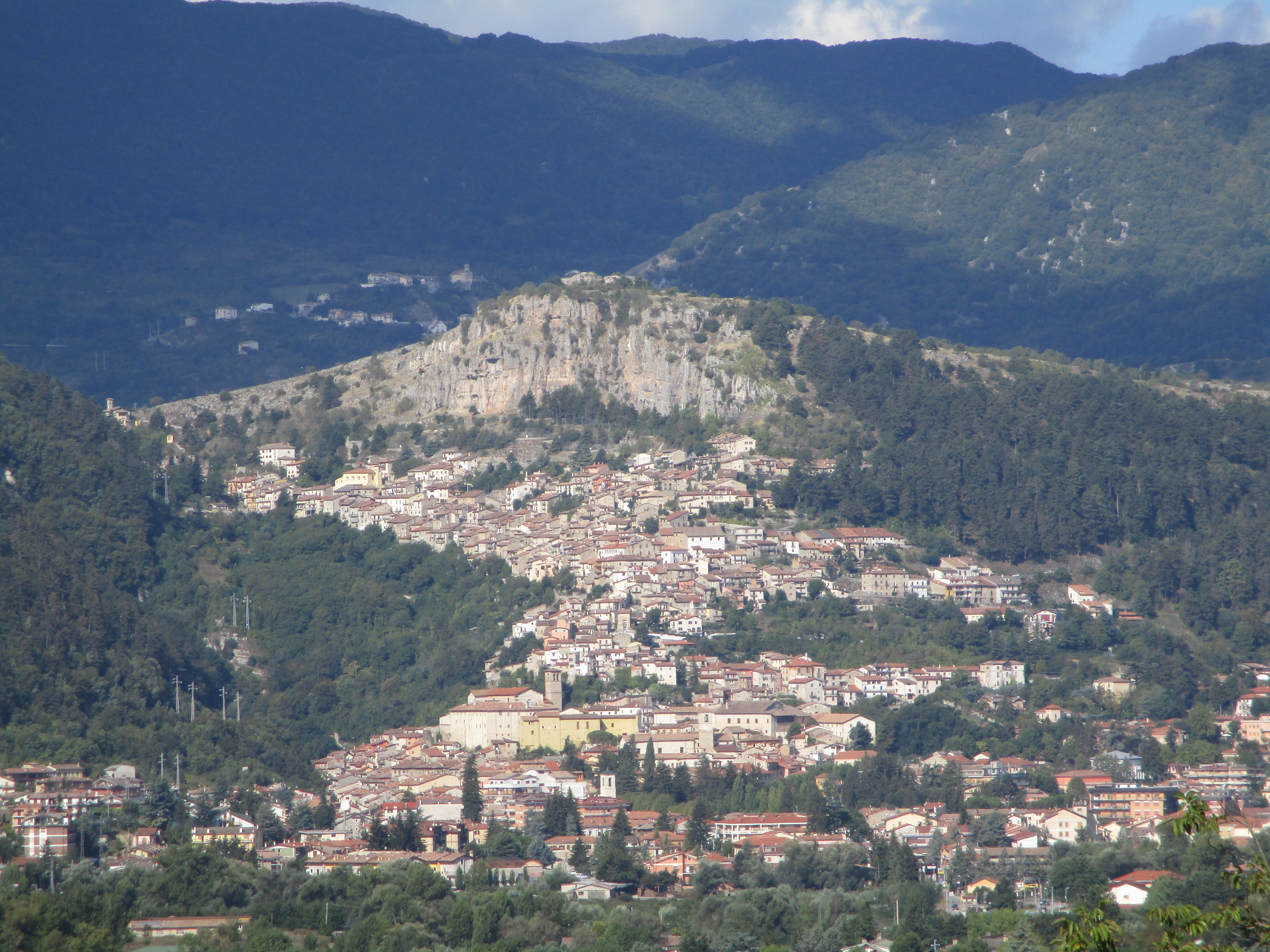

- Coat of arms

- Location within Italy Location within Abruzzo
- Coordinates: 42°4′13″N 13°15′20″E
- Country: Italy
- Region: Abruzzo
- Province: L'Aquila (AQ)
- Frazioni: Altolaterra, Colle San Giacomo, Gallo, Marsia, Oriente, Piccola Svizzera, Poggetello, Poggio Filippo, Roccacerro, San Donato, Sfratati, Sorbo, Tremonti, Villa San Sebastiano

Government
  - Mayor: Vincenzo Giovagnorio (Prospettiva Futura)

Area
  - Total: 87.4 km^{2} (33.7 sq mi)
- Elevation: 740 m (2,430 ft)

Population (30 June 2016)
  - Total: 6,866
  - Density: 78.6/km^{2} (203/sq mi)
- Demonym: Tagliacozzani
- Time zone: UTC+1 (CET)
  - Summer (DST): UTC+2 (CEST)
- Postal code: 67069
- Dialing code: 0863
- Patron saint: St. Peter
- Saint day: 13 June
- Website: Official website

Tagliacozzo (Italian: [taʎʎaˈkɔttso]; Marsicano: Tajacózzo) is a town and comune (municipality) in the province of L'Aquila, Abruzzo, central Italy. It is one of I Borghi più belli d'Italia ("The most beautiful villages of Italy").

== History ==
Tagliacozzo lies in an area inhabited in early historic times by the Aequi and the Marsi, although the first mentions of the town dates from the 11th century AD. Later it was a possession on the Orsini, who established a mint here. They were succeeded by the Colonna (local lords including Prospero and Marcantonio Colonna), who held the Duchy of Tagliacozzo until 1806.

Near the modern city (more precisely, near Scurcola Marsicana) was fought the Battle of Tagliacozzo (1268) between Conradin of Hohenstaufen and Charles I of Anjou, which resulted in Conradin's defeat and eventual execution.

== Main sights ==
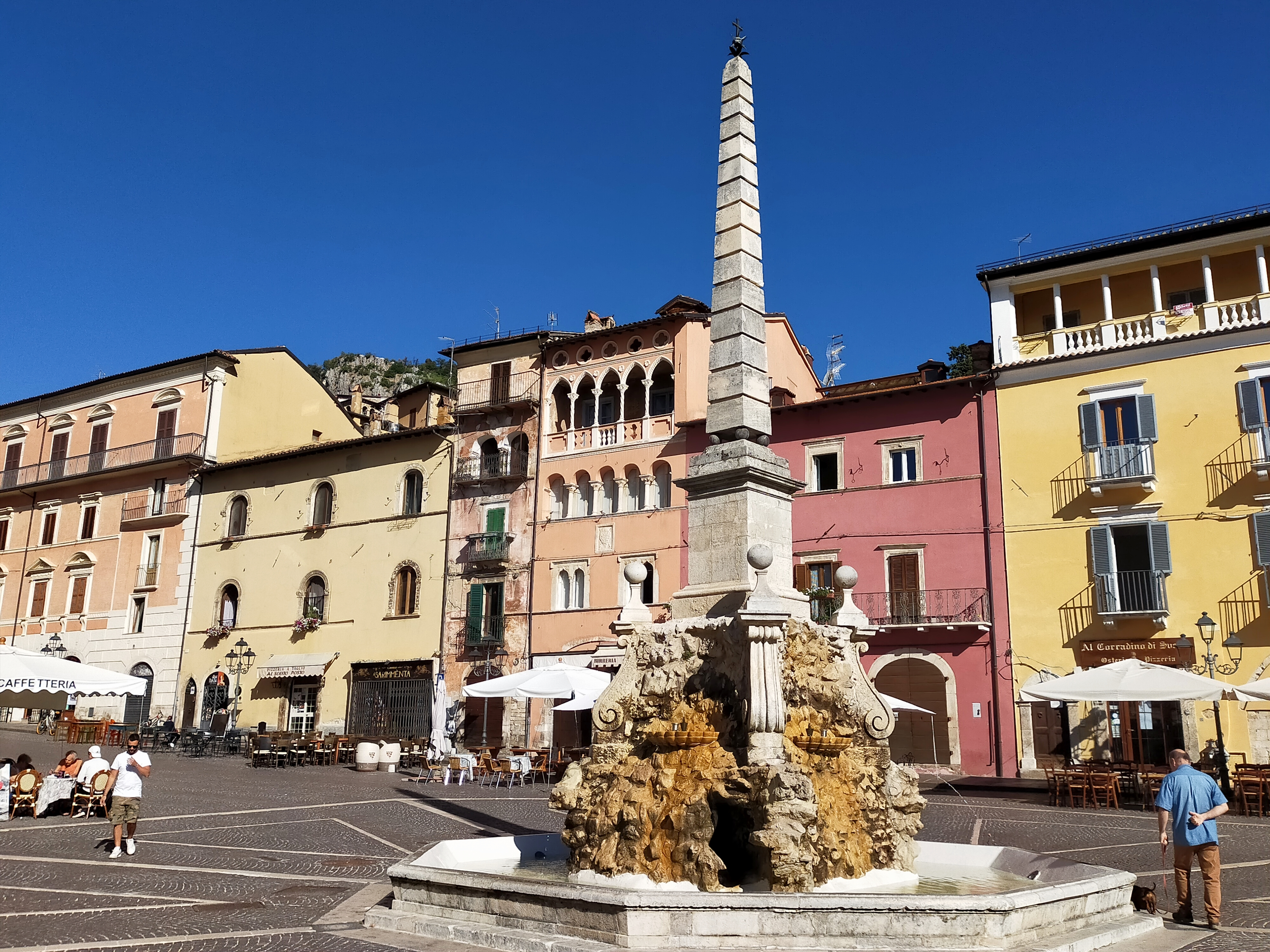
Piazza dell'Obelisco

- The Palazzo Ducale (Ducal Palace), built at the end of the 14th century by Roberto Orsini.
- The Convent of St. Francis, housing the tomb of Tommaso da Celano.
- Museo Orientale, with collections of Egyptian, Ethiopian and Eastern findings.
- 18th century fountain in Piazza dell'Obelisco, a national monument.
- Sanctuary of Maria Santissima dell'Oriente, on a hill 3 kilometres (1.9 mi) from town. It is cited as early as the 14th century.

== People ==
- Andrea Argoli (1570–1657), mathematician, astronomer and astrologer

== Climate ==
Climate data for Tagliacozzo, elevation 730 m (2,400 ft), (1951–2000)
Month	Jan	Feb	Mar	Apr	May	Jun	Jul	Aug	Sep	Oct	Nov	Dec	Year
Record high °C (°F)	19.0 (66.2)	24.0 (75.2)	25.0 (77.0)	29.0 (84.2)	33.0 (91.4)	35.5 (95.9)	38.5 (101.3)	40.0 (104.0)	38.0 (100.4)	30.0 (86.0)	24.0 (75.2)	18.0 (64.4)	40.0 (104.0)
Mean daily maximum °C (°F)	7.3 (45.1)	9.0 (48.2)	12.2 (54.0)	15.3 (59.5)	20.7 (69.3)	24.4 (75.9)	27.7 (81.9)	27.9 (82.2)	23.8 (74.8)	18.4 (65.1)	11.9 (53.4)	7.6 (45.7)	17.2 (62.9)
Daily mean °C (°F)	2.5 (36.5)	3.7 (38.7)	6.3 (43.3)	9.1 (48.4)	13.7 (56.7)	17.0 (62.6)	19.5 (67.1)	19.6 (67.3)	16.2 (61.2)	11.6 (52.9)	6.7 (44.1)	3.2 (37.8)	10.8 (51.4)
Mean daily minimum °C (°F)	−2.4 (27.7)	−1.6 (29.1)	0.4 (32.7)	3.0 (37.4)	6.7 (44.1)	9.5 (49.1)	11.3 (52.3)	11.3 (52.3)	8.7 (47.7)	4.9 (40.8)	1.4 (34.5)	−1.2 (29.8)	4.3 (39.8)
Record low °C (°F)	−17.0 (1.4)	−13.0 (8.6)	−13.5 (7.7)	−6.2 (20.8)	−3.8 (25.2)	1.0 (33.8)	0.5 (32.9)	1.0 (33.8)	−1.0 (30.2)	−6.0 (21.2)	−12.0 (10.4)	−15.0 (5.0)	−17.0 (1.4)
Average precipitation mm (inches)	79.5 (3.13)	84.8 (3.34)	74.2 (2.92)	86.9 (3.42)	68.4 (2.69)	50.8 (2.00)	36.1 (1.42)	42.1 (1.66)	68.5 (2.70)	101.6 (4.00)	147.3 (5.80)	125.6 (4.94)	965.8 (38.02)
Average precipitation days	9.4	9.0	9.2	9.6	9.0	7.4	5.6	5.3	6.6	8.7	10.7	10.7	101.2
Source: Regione Abruzzo
