= Petrus van der Aa =

16th-century Brabantine jurist

Petrus or Pieter van der Aa (1530–1594), also called Vanderanus, was a Brabantine jurist.

== Biography ==
Petrus van der Aa was born in Leuven. His father, Johan van der Aa, was a descendant of a well-known Brabantine family of patricians, which had settled in Leuven, Mechelen and Antwerp.

While his biographers disagree on some events in his life, it is considered that Petrus studied in Leuven and achieved his Doctor iuris utriusque in 1559. Three years later he was given a professorship in the same town, when his predecessor, Johannes Tack, moved to Douai in France.

In 1565 or 1569 he became a member of the Sovereign Council of Duchy of Brabant. In 1574, he became president of the Higher Regional Court of Luxembourg and Chiny. He continued in this office until his death in 1594. Petrus van der Aa acquired the title eques auratus (Knight of the Golden Spur) on 30 October 1583.

== Publications ==
- Prochiron sive Enchiridon Judiciarum, 1558, includes a preface De ordine judiciario apud veteres usitato.
- De privilegiis creditorum commentarius, ad Joachimum Hopperum, 1560, reprinted in Tractatus Tractatuum, Vol. XVIII and Nov. Thesaurus II.

== Sources ==
- Allgemeine Deutsche Biographie - online version at Wikisource
- Winkler Prins' Geïllustreerde encyclopaedie, 1905, page 2
