= Secinaro =

- Comune
- Comune di Secinaro
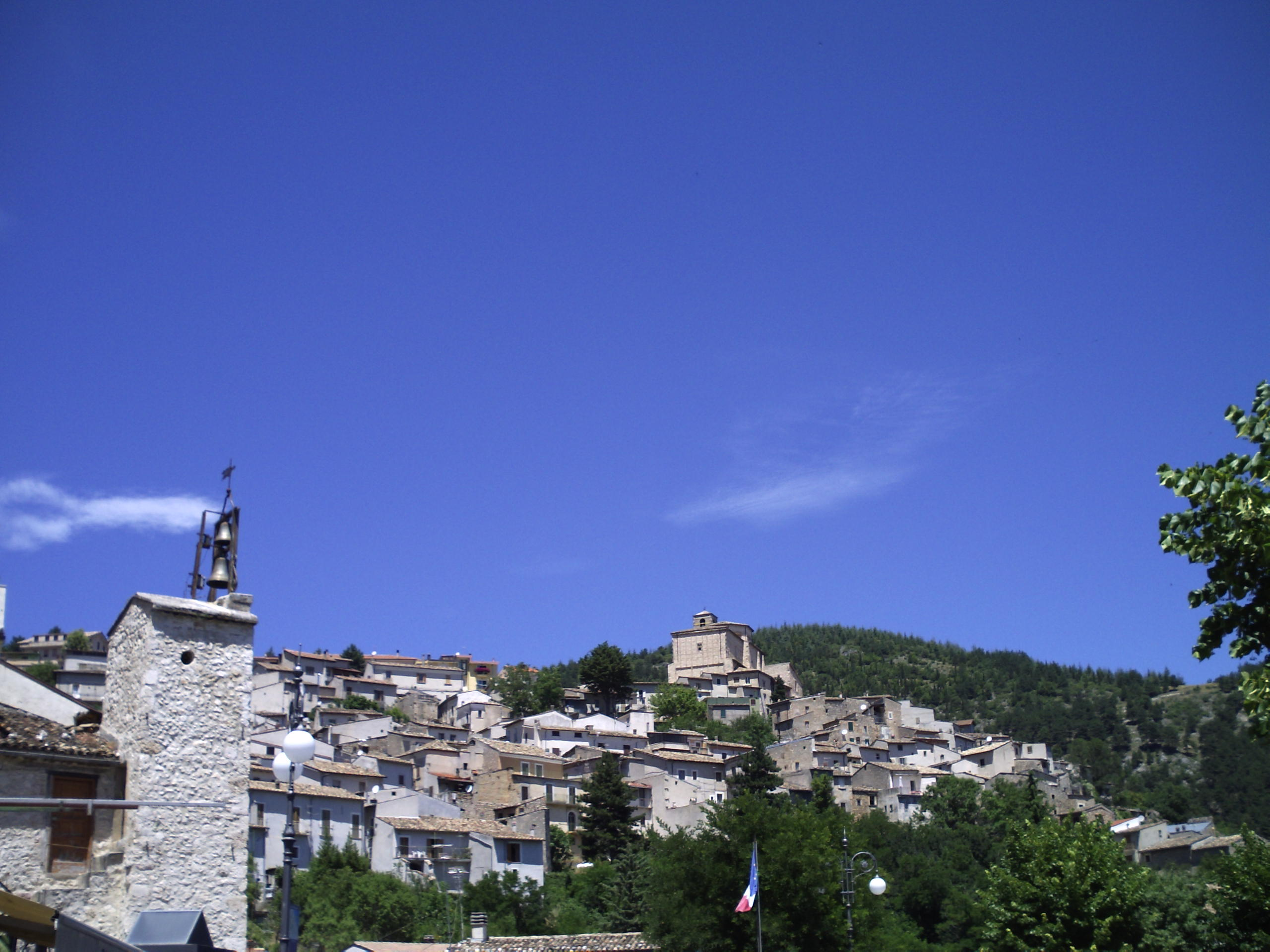

- Location within Italy Location within Abruzzo
- Coordinates: 42°09′14″N 13°38′12″E
- Country: Italy
- Region: Abruzzo
- Province: L'Aquila (AQ)

Government
  - Mayor: Clementina Graziani

Area
  - Total: 31.95 km^{2} (12.34 sq mi)
- Elevation: 859 m (2,818 ft)

Population (1 January 2007)
  - Total: 438
  - Density: 13.7/km^{2} (35.5/sq mi)
- Demonym: Secinaresi
- Time zone: UTC+1 (CET)
  - Summer (DST): UTC+2 (CEST)
- Postal code: 67029
- Dialing code: 0864
- Patron saint: St. Nicholas of Bari

Secinaro (Abruzzese: Secinerë) is a comune and town in the province of L'Aquila in the Abruzzo region of central Italy. It is located in the Aterno River valley, on the slopes of Monte Sirente.

In the nearby a "crater field" (including a series of craters ranging from 2 to 140 metres (6.6 to 460 ft) in diameter) was recently attributed to a meteor rain.

== See also ==
- Sirente crater
