= Sirente crater =

Seasonal lake in Abruzzo, Italy

Coordinates: 42°10′38″N 13°35′45″E

The Sirente crater (Italian: Cratere del Sirente) is a small shallow seasonal lake in Abruzzo, central Italy. The depression, which is located at the center of the Prati del Sirente, a mountainous highland north of the Sirente massif in the Apennines, is 13 km (8.1 mi) from the village of Secinaro. Its formation has prompted a number of theories in recent years, including a meteorite impact.

Interest in the Sirente crater began in the late 1990s after Swedish geologist Jens Ormö, an impact crater specialist, noticed ridges near the site that indicated a bolide collision. A research team named "The Sirente Crater Group" along with two scientists from the International Research School of Planetary Science of Pescara (IRSPS) began a detailed examination of the area. The team concluded the meteorite struck the Earth with the force of a small nuclear bomb; approximately one kiloton in yield. The blast would have created a mushroom cloud and shockwaves similar to a nuclear explosion.

== Formation theories ==
=== Meteorite ===
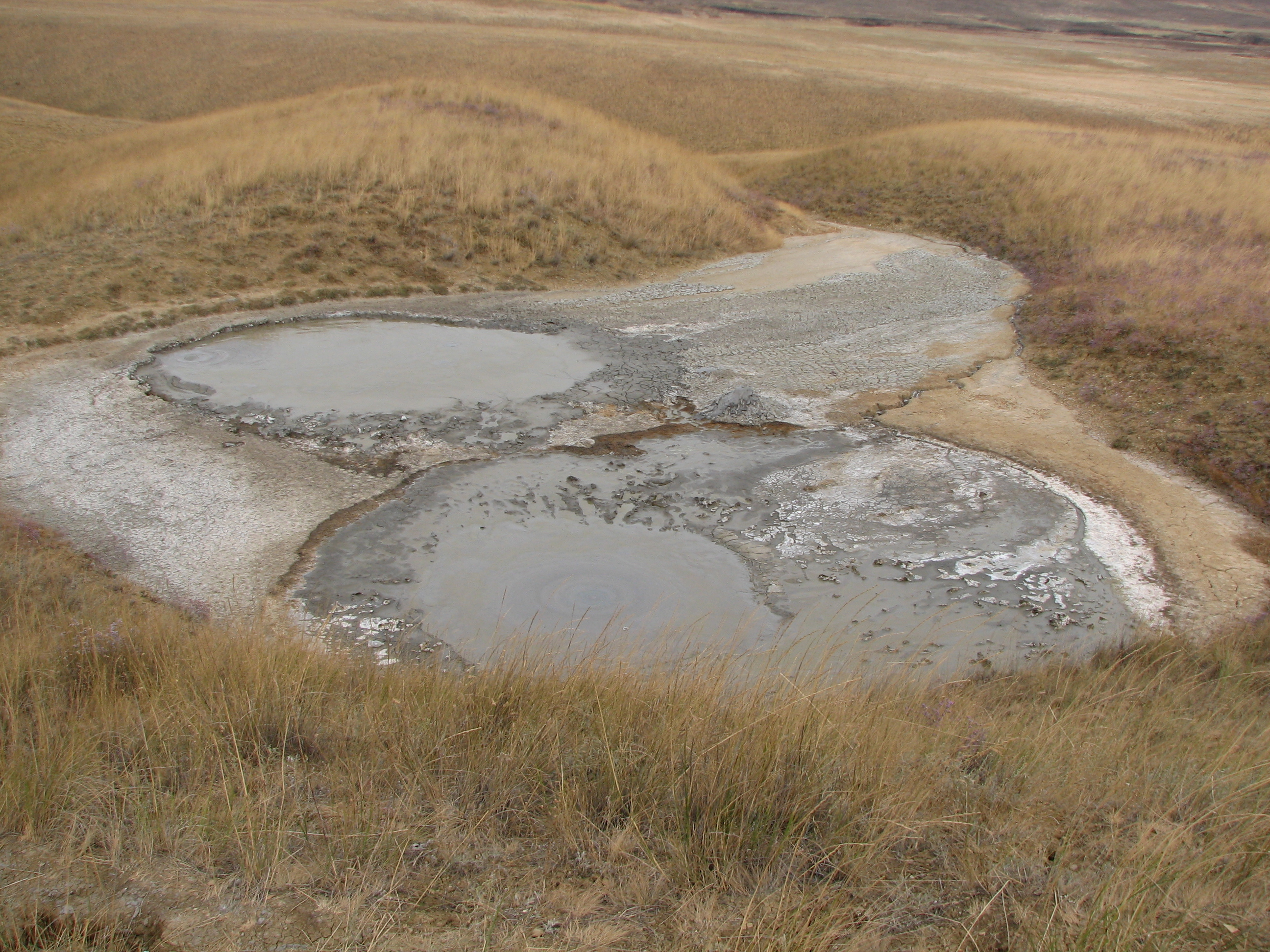
A mud volcano, like these on the Taman Peninsula in Russia, may have formed the Sirente crater.

The Sirente Crater Group proposed a meteoric origin for this structure in the late 1990s and results were updated in the following decade. A calibrated age of 412 AD was given in 2002.

=== Anthropogenic (humans) ===
In 2004 a group of geologists led by Fabio Speranza working in the Istituto Nazionale di Geofisica e Vulcanologia hypothesized that the lake basin was excavated by humans in order to collect natural water for livestock. A similar "shepherdogenic" hypothesis was that the site was a sheep dip, considering the lack of any evidence for impact shock in the area. The nature of the depressions is now believed by Speranza et al. to be karstic or be the result of human activity combined with the action of natural karstic processes. Although the crater lake was suggested to be just part of a larger crater field comprising about 30 individual depressions in the Sirente area, studies have shown the “crater field” is more likely to be the result of human activity.

The theory of the combined anthropic excavation and karstic origin for the Sirente crater doesn't seem however compatible with the result of some seismic and electrical resistivity tests that were performed under the surface of the Sirente lake. More specifically, the geological structure appears too deep to have been excavated by humans in a highly unstable material context and a downward continuation typical of the underground removal of material during karst development is also lacking.

Large numbers of metallic fragments have been found in samples taken from within the crater area. Analysis has proved they were pieces from exploded ordnance such as bombs and grenades. This had led to the theory that wartime bombing could also be the cause of the crater.

=== Geological ===
In 2005 Dr Francesco Stoppa from the Gabriele d'Annunzio University proposed that a rapid emission of mud and/or water could also be a potential cause for the basin's formation.

== Analysis and interpretation ==
The Abruzzo region

An impact generating a crater the size of one at Sirente would have been visible from a great distance. Skyward it would have first been seen as a strip of fire that turned into a fireball before culminating in a pyrotechnic bolide.

Early radiocarbon dating apparently fixed the formation of the main crater within the 4th and 5th centuries AD (c. 301–401 AD). In this period, the territory was part of the Roman municipium of Superaequum. A local Roman village belonging to Superaequum is known to have been suddenly abandoned, possibly in consequence of fire during the 4th century. Christian catacombs dating to the same period reveal bodies were piled-up hurriedly in a manner indicating a public calamity.

A story, taken from the oral traditions of Abruzzo, concerning the region's religious conversion from Paganism to Christianity possibly records the impact event in the 5th century AD.

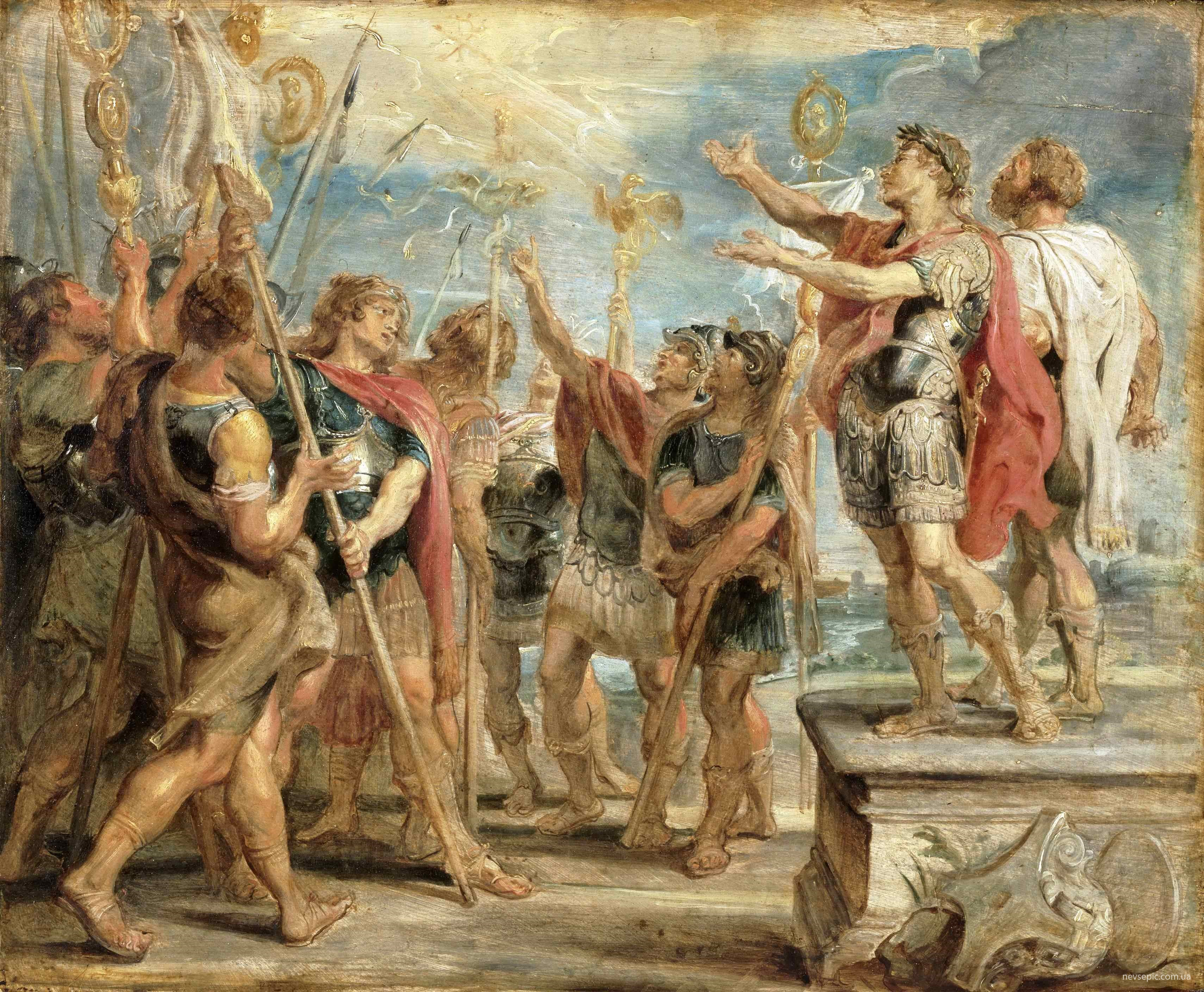
The 16th century The conversion of Constantine by Rubens

It was in the afternoon...an uproar hit the mountain and quartered the giant oaks announcing the violent arrival of the Goddess. A sudden and intense heat overwhelmed the people and a shout echoed all around, splitting the air with its trail of violence [...] All of a sudden, over there, in the distance, in the sky, a new star, never seen before, bigger than the other ones, came nearer and nearer, appeared and disappeared behind the top of the eastern mountains. Peoples’ eyes looked at the strange light growing bigger and bigger. Soon the star shone as large as a new sun. An irresistible, dazzling light pervaded the sky. The oak leaves shuddered, discoloured, and curled up. The forest lost its sap.

The Sirente was shaking. In a tremendous rumble the statue sank into a sudden chasm. The satyrs and the Bacchantes fell down senseless. A huge silence fell. It seemed as if time had stopped in the ancient wood near the temple at the foot of the Sirente, and it looked like the mountain had never existed. The entire valley became dumb. Not a breath of wind could be heard, nor a sheep bleating from the numerous herds, nor a rustle from the strong trees, nor a human sound. After an endless period of time, when stars shone in the sky without the moon, a new breeze came to stir the leaves; sheep were heard again and the Mountain was dressed in the light of a new dawn.

Faint stars disappeared, blue sky slowly came back and the Sirente became a golden mountain in the first rays of the new sun. It looked like the Valley was full of roses. Newly awake, men listened closely to the death rattle of the Goddess at the foot of the wood; and then they saw the statue of the Madonna with the Holy Child in her arms who was sitting on a throne of light and was surrounded by light.

The location and contemporaneous formation of the Sirente impact has led some researchers to re-examine the historic occasion (the Battle of the Milvian Bridge on 28 October 312) when Constantine I was said to have had a vision prompting his conversion to Christianity.

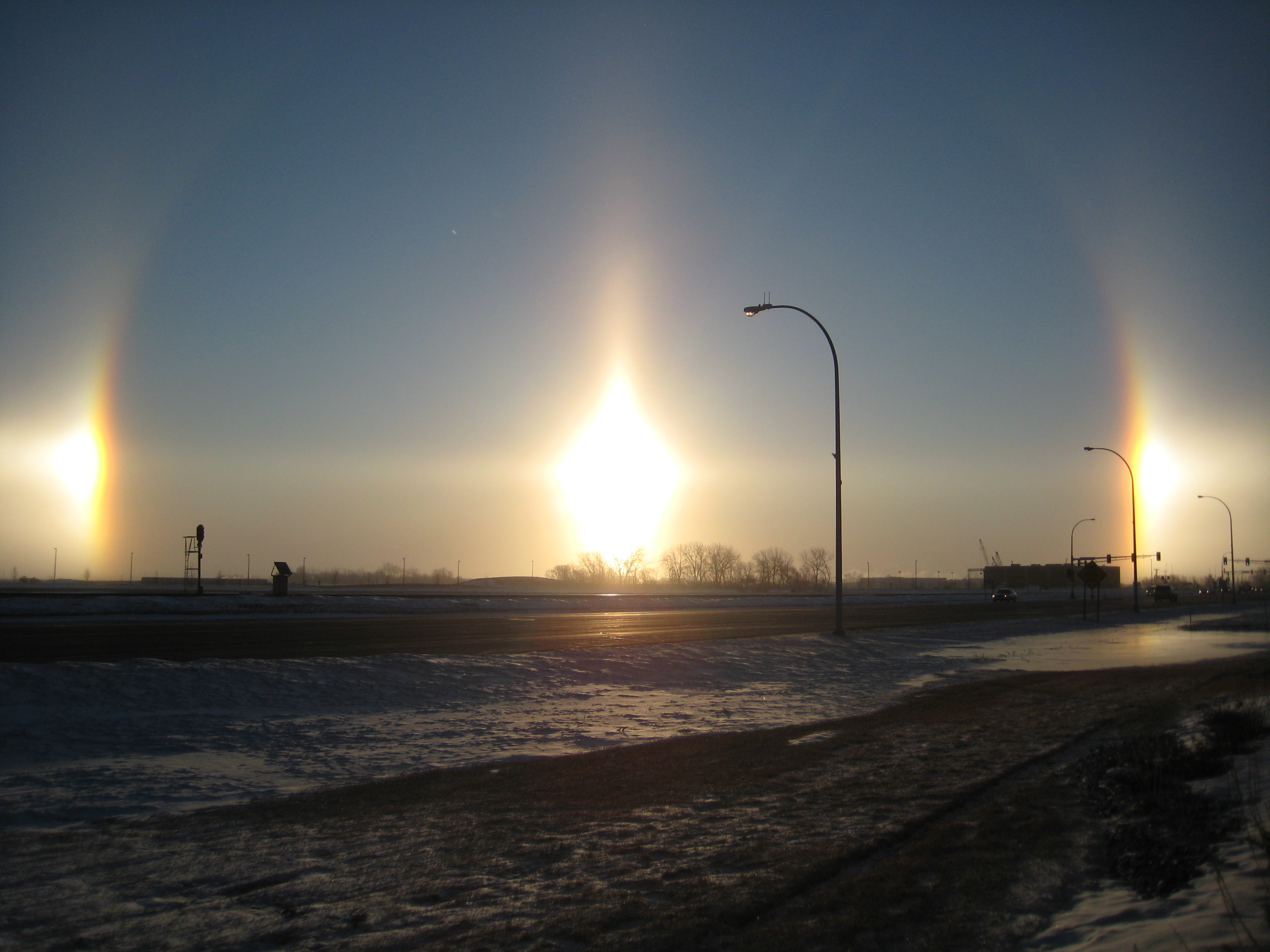
Example of a sun dog

He said that about noon, when the day was already beginning to decline, he saw with his own eyes the trophy of "a cross of light in the heavens, above the sun", and bearing the inscription, Conquer by this. At this sight he himself was struck with amazement, and his whole army also, which followed him on this expedition, and witnessed the miracle.

— Eusebius, Life of Constantine, XXIX

In a 2003 paper, Santilli, Ormö, et al. noted that, shortly before the battle of the Milvian Bridge, Constantine I and his military forces were camped only 100 km (62 mi) WSW from the proposed impact site. Though a coincidence between the two events is speculation, the hypothesis that the Sirente impact might have been mistaken for a divine act was widely reported in the media.

However, the vision at the Battle of the Milvian Bridge has also been considered as a phenomenon called a sun dog.
