= Capestrano =

- Comune
- Comune di Capestrano
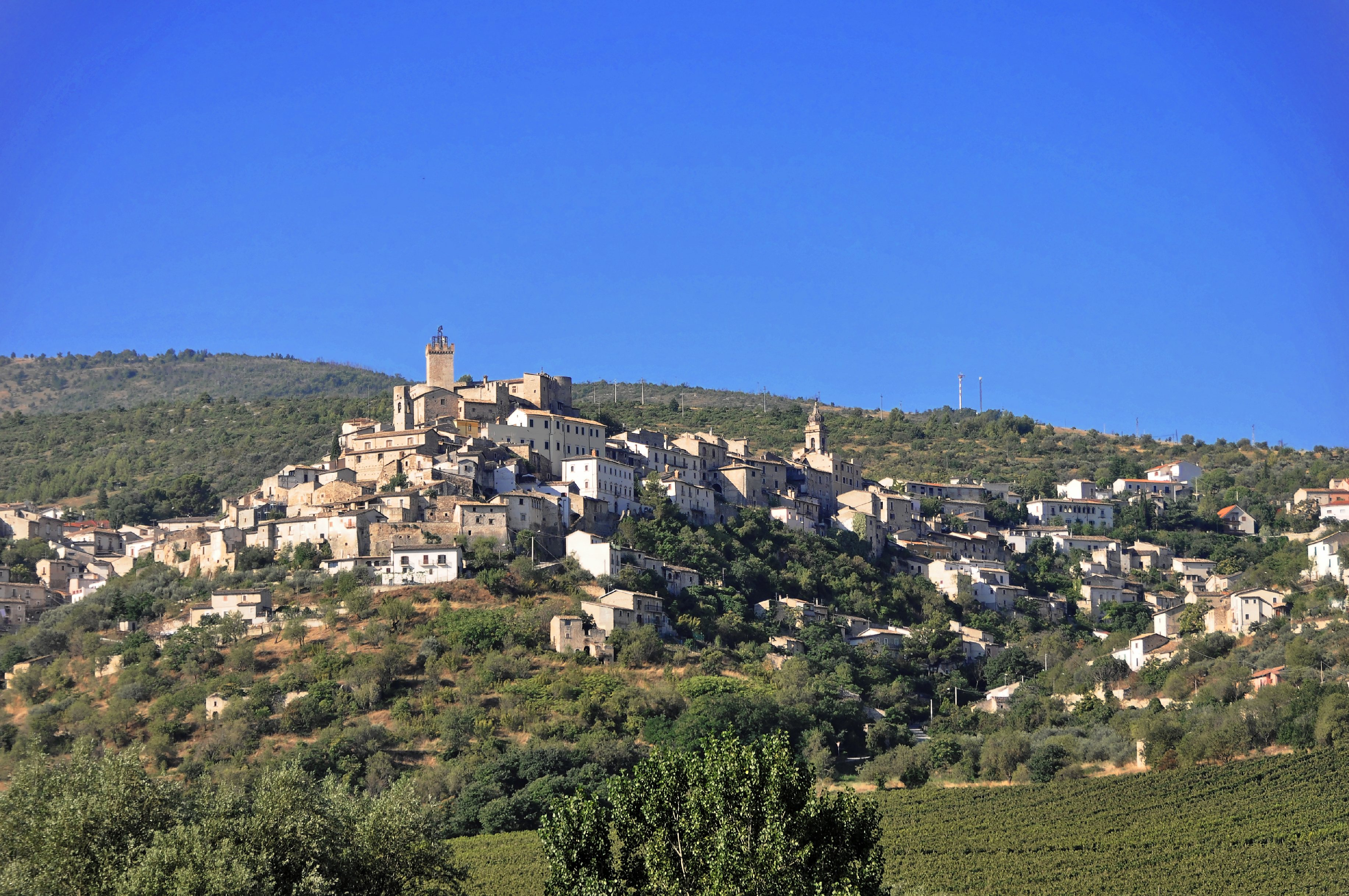

- Location within Italy Location within Abruzzo
- Coordinates: 42°16′03″N 13°46′06″E
- Country: Italy
- Region: Abruzzo
- Province: L'Aquila (AQ)
- Frazioni: Capodacqua, Forca di Penne, Santa Pelagia, Scarafano

Government
  - Mayor: Antonio D' Alfonso

Area
  - Total: 43.66 km^{2} (16.86 sq mi)
- Elevation: 465 m (1,526 ft)
- Demonym: Capestranesi
- Time zone: UTC+1 (CET)
  - Summer (DST): UTC+2 (CEST)
- Postal code: 67022
- Dialing code: 0862
- Patron saint: St. John of Capestrano
- Saint day: 23 October
- Website: Official website

Capestrano (Abruzzese: Capëstrànë) is a comune and small town with 885 inhabitants (2017), in the Province of L'Aquila, Abruzzo, Italy. It is located in the Gran Sasso e Monti della Laga National Park.

== History ==
=== Antiquity ===
In the necropolis the statue of the "Warrior of Capestrano" (6th century BC) was found during the work in a field by a farmer. The 2.09-metre (6.9 ft) tall statue depicts an early Italic warrior in full gear, the king of the Vestini tribe, Naevius Pompuledius, executed by the sculptor Aninis. Now the statue is on display in the National Archaeological Museum of the Abruzzi in Chieti.

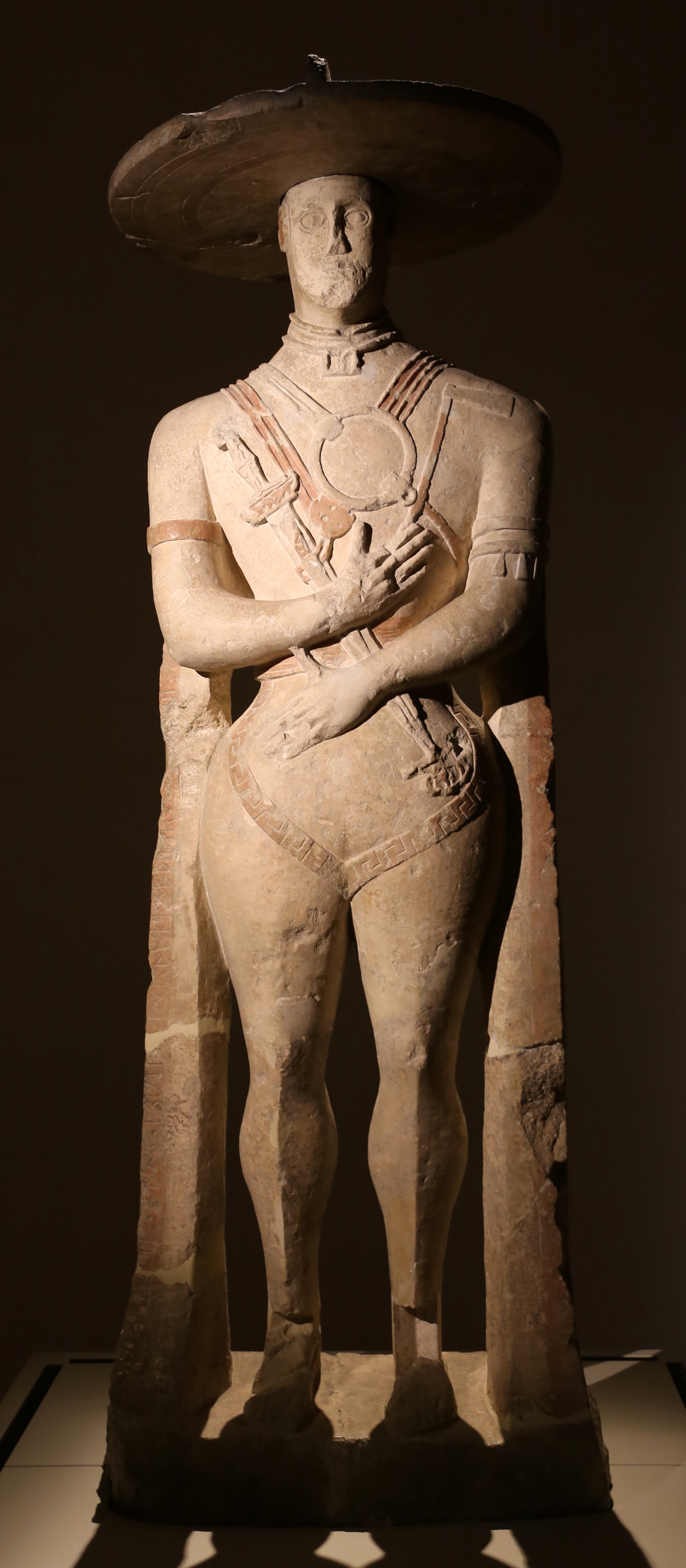
Guerriero di capestrano, da capestrano, 600-550 ac ca. 02

== Geography ==
Capestrano borders with the municipalities of Brittoli, Bussi sul Tirino, Carapelle Calvisio, Castelvecchio Calvisio, Collepietro, Corvara, Navelli, Ofena, Pescosansonesco and Villa Santa Lucia degli Abruzzi.

It includes four civil parishes (frazioni): Capodacqua, Forca di Penne, Santa Pelagia and Scarafano.

== Main sights ==
=== San Pietro ad Oratorium Abbey ===
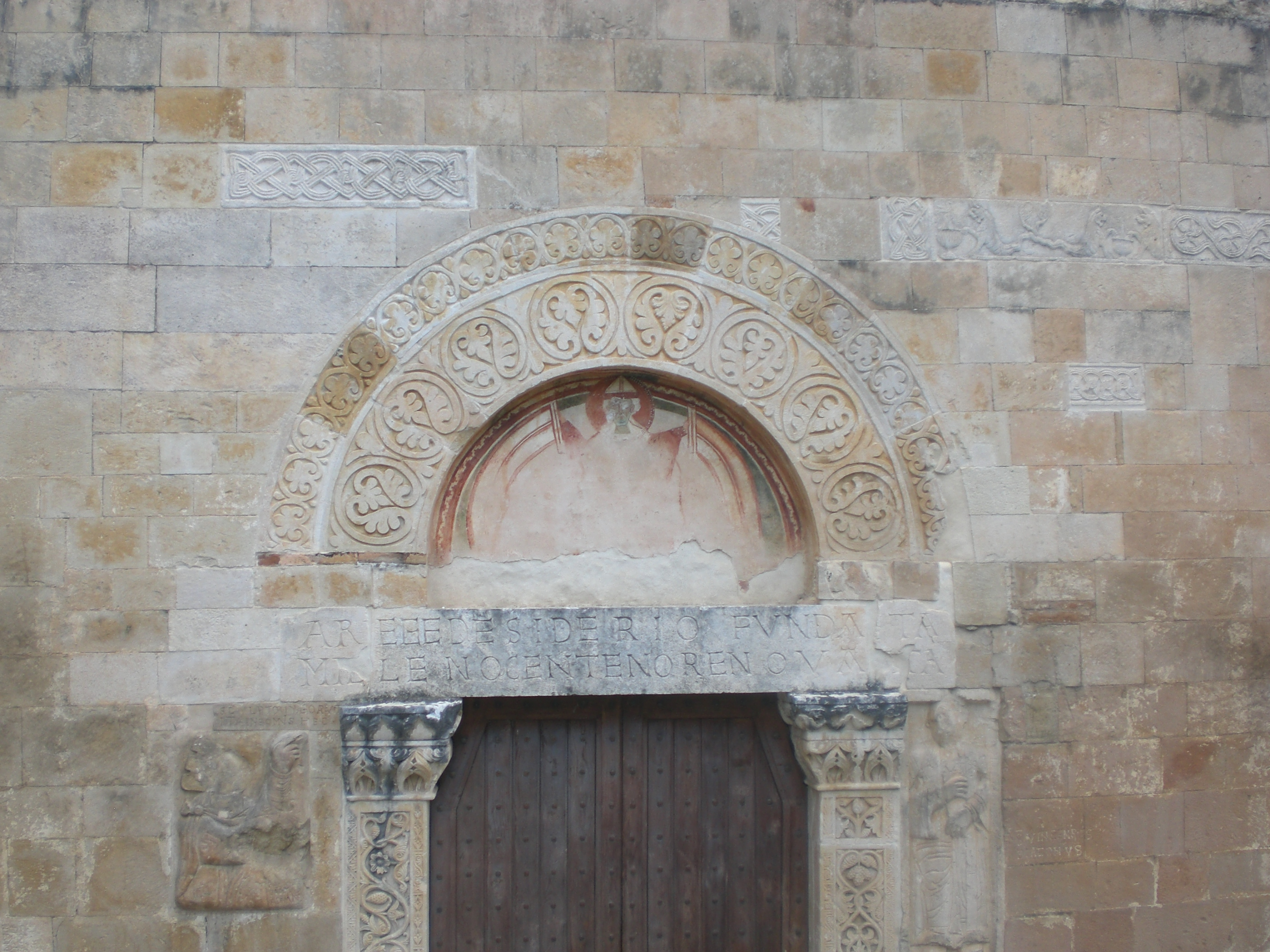
Front door of St Peter ad Oratorium in Capestrano

This former Benedictine Abbey was founded on the bank of Tirino river, 6 kilometres (3.7 mi) from Capestrano. Chronicles suggest that some church structure might have been present by the 7th century, but the original abbey was commissioned in AD 752 by the Lombard king Desiderius, and made subservient to the monastery of San Vincenzo al Volturno. In 1117, the church was consecrated by Pope Pasqual II. The present church building was initially erected in the 12th century; of the monastery buildings little remains but ruins.

=== Piccolomini or Mediceo Castle ===
The castle was built in the 13th century, on the hill next to the Tirino river and the Abbey of St. Peter ad Oratorium in a strategic position at 505 m above sea level. It was a feud of Tolomeo di Raiano in 1240, and was granted to the Acquaviva family in 1284 by Charles I of Angio (King Charles I of Sicily). Riccardo d'Acquaviva was thus named marquis of Capestrano. In 1462 the Castle passed on to Marquis Antonio I Todeschini Piccolomini d'Aragona (d. 1493), nephew of Pope Pius II, who enlarged the castle with new towers with battlements. In 1579 Marquess Costanza Piccolomini, daughter of Innico Piccolomini, sold the castle to Francesco I de' Medici, Grand Duke of Tuscany. In 1743 the Castle passed on to Charles III of Spain in his capacity as Charles III Bourbon, King of Naples and the two Sicilies. In 1860 the Castle passed on to the Savoyard King of Italy.

=== Lake of Capodacqua ===
In the frazione of Capodacqua is located the lake of the same name, locally famous for the presence of the ruins of submerged mills.

== Notable people ==
- Saint Giovanni da Capistrano (John of Capistrano), an Italian friar, theologian and inquisitor was born here in 1386.
- The Italian-born American composer Dalmazio Santini (1923–2001) was born in Capestrano.
- Eugene Victor Alessandroni was born in Capestrano in 1887. He emigrated with his family to Philadelphia, Pennsylvania in 1890. He was a graduate of the University of Pennsylvania Law School. In 1927 he became the first Italian-American judge in Pennsylvania when he was appointed to the Court of Common Pleas, 1st district of Pennsylvania. He was elected judge Court of Common Pleas, 1st District of Pennsylvania, for term, 1928-1938, re-elected for terms, 1938-1958.

== Twin Cities ==
- Buda (Part of Budapest, Hungary)
- San Juan Capistrano (California, United States)

== Photo gallery ==
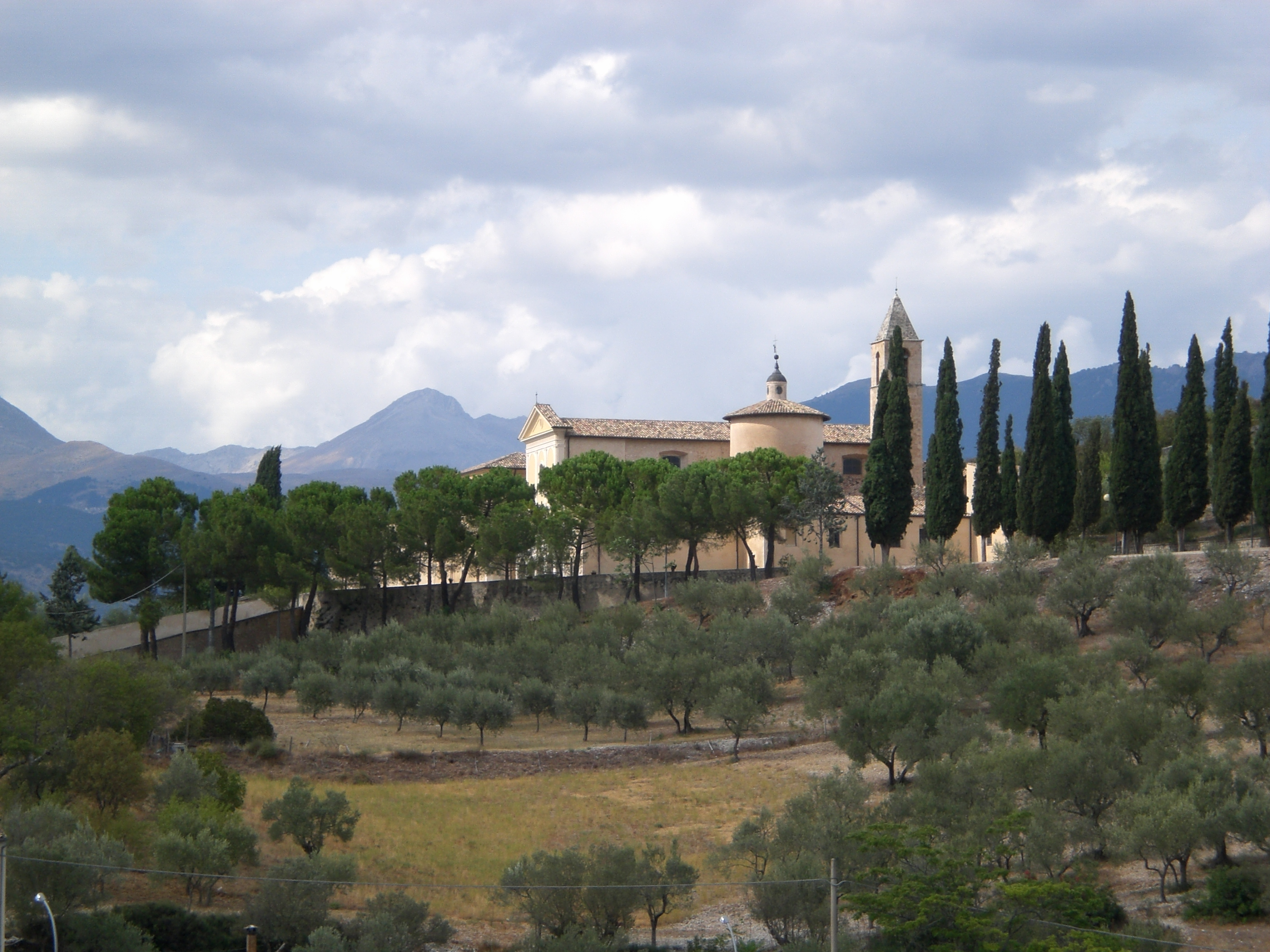
Saint Giovanni da Capistrano convent

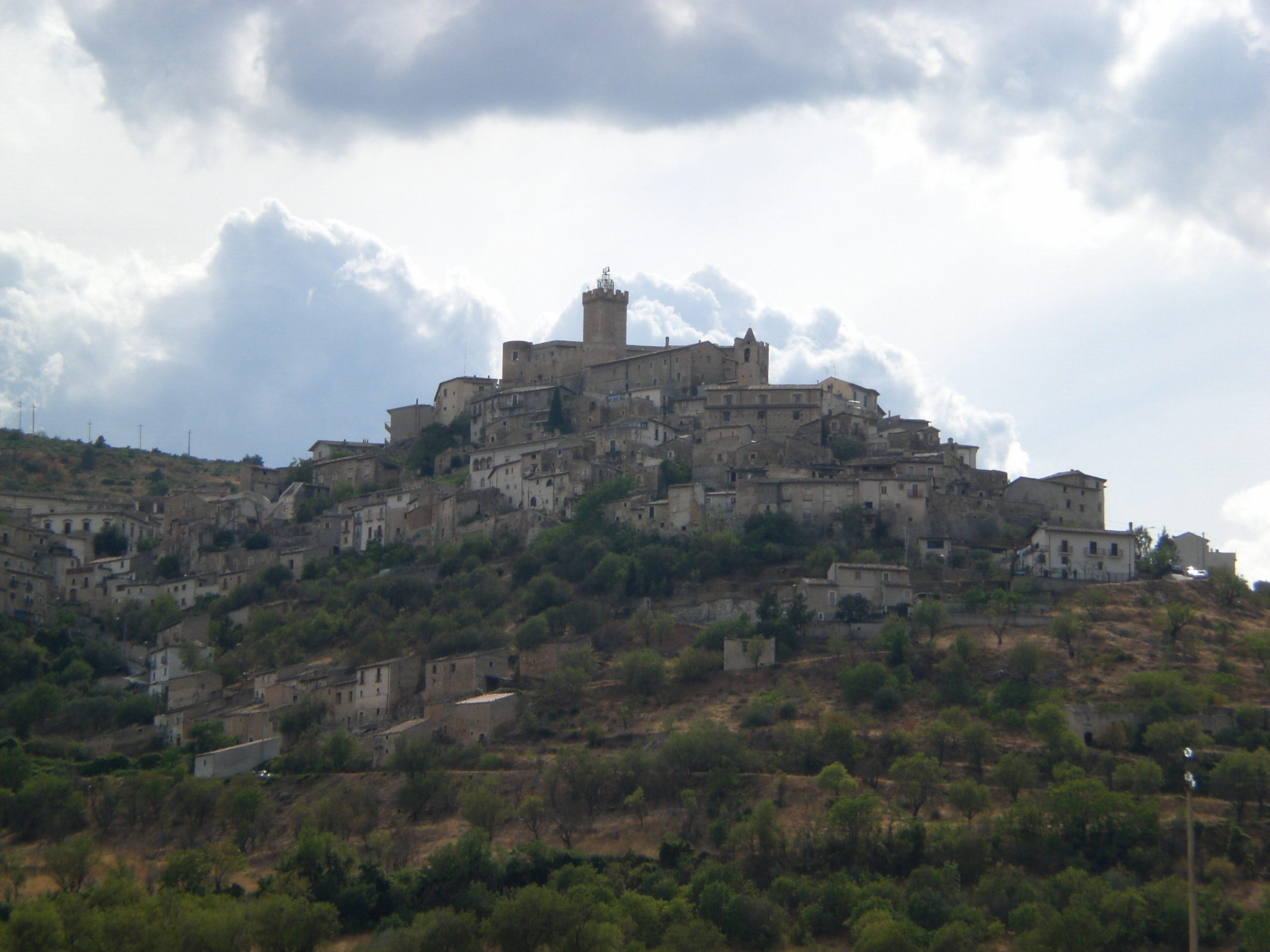
Capestrano - view of the village

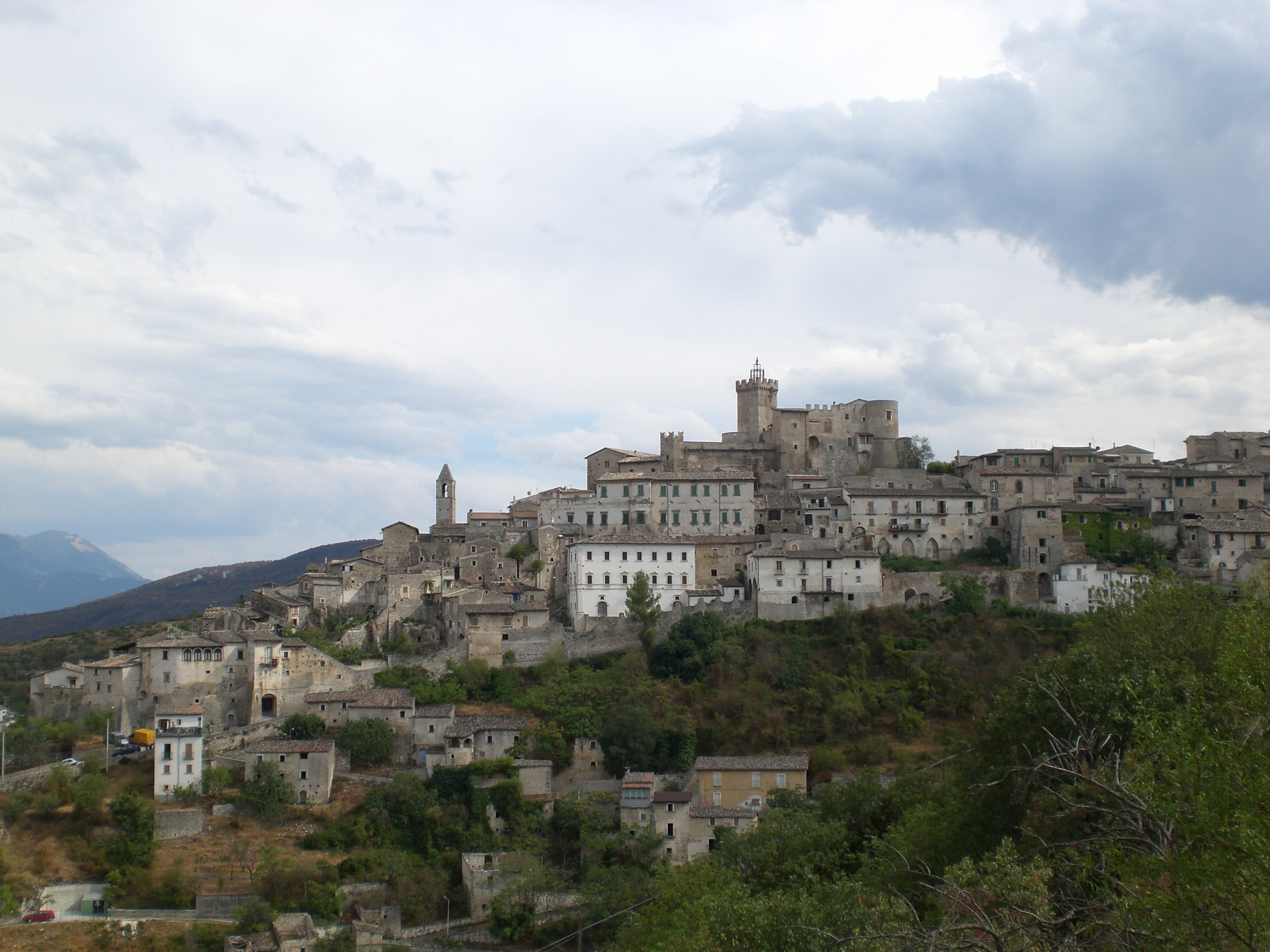
Capestrano, view of the village from west

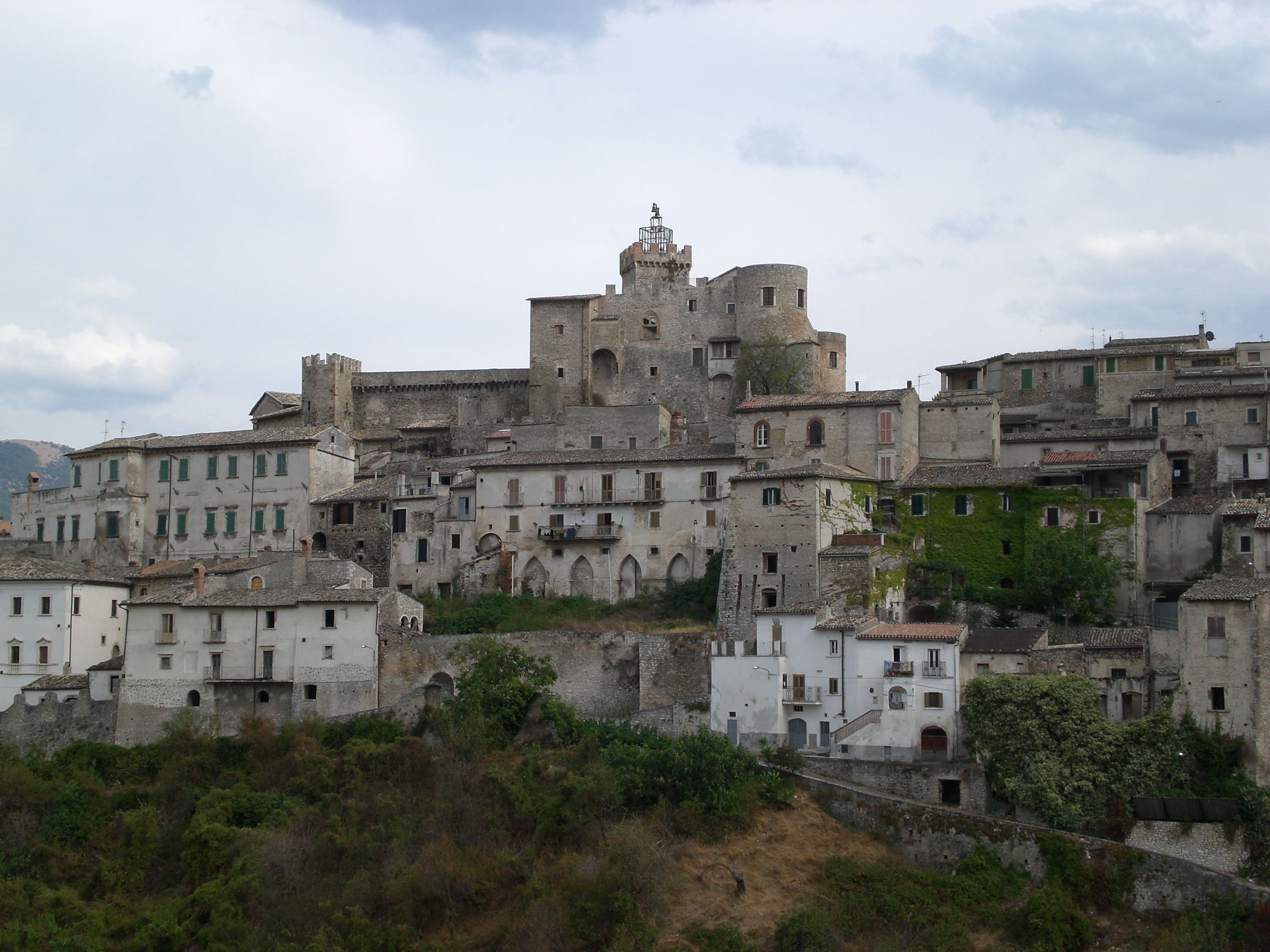
Capestrano, view of the village

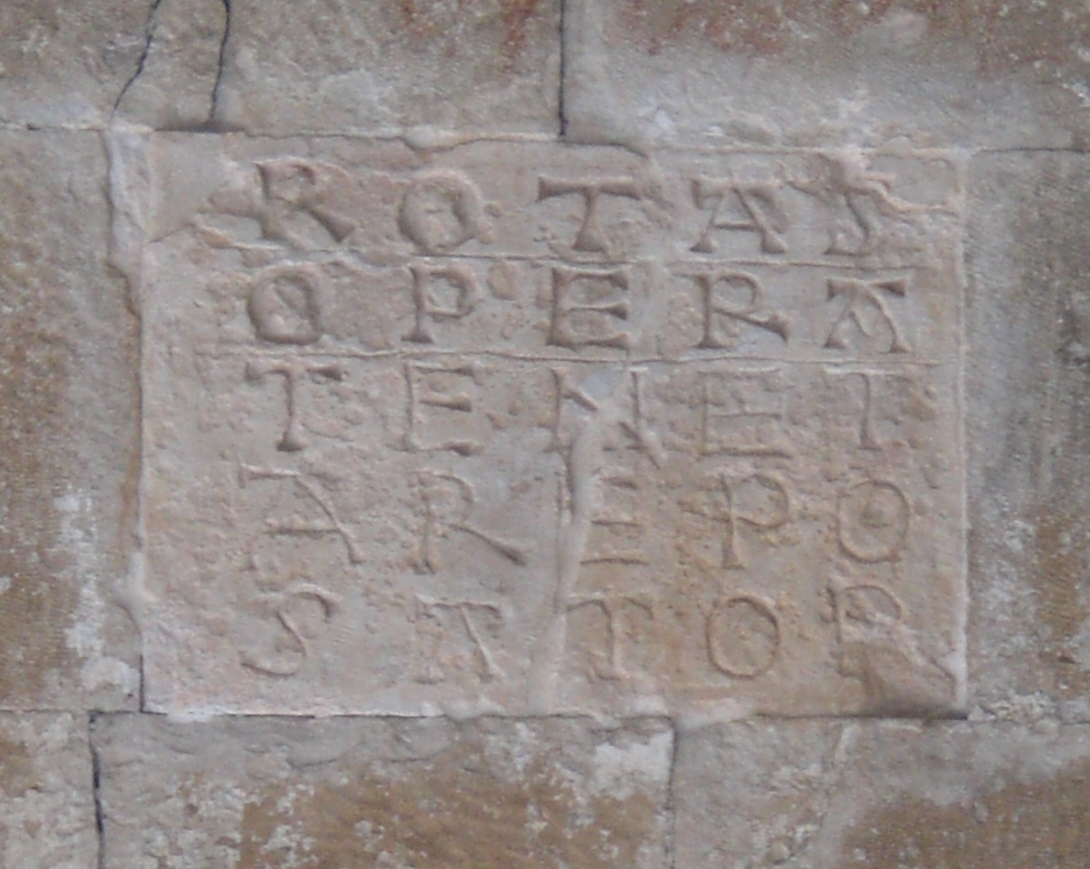
Enigmatic inscription of St Peter ad Oratorium, the Sator Square
