= Corvara =

Corvara may refer to:

== Places ==
- Corvara, South Tyrol, a municipality in South Tyrol
- Corvara, Abruzzo, a comune in the Province of Pescara

== People ==
- Will Corvara (born 1983), a Spanish photographer and writer
