= Cagnano (disambiguation) =

- Cagnano is a municipality in the Haute-Corse department, Corsica.

Cagnano may also refer to:

== Places in Italy ==
- Cagnano Amiterno, a municipality in the province of L'Aquila, Abruzzo.
- Cagnano Varano, a municipality in the province of Foggia, Apulia.
- Pontecagnano Faiano, a town and municipality in the province of Salerno, Campania.
