= Brittoli =

- Comune
- Comune di Brittoli
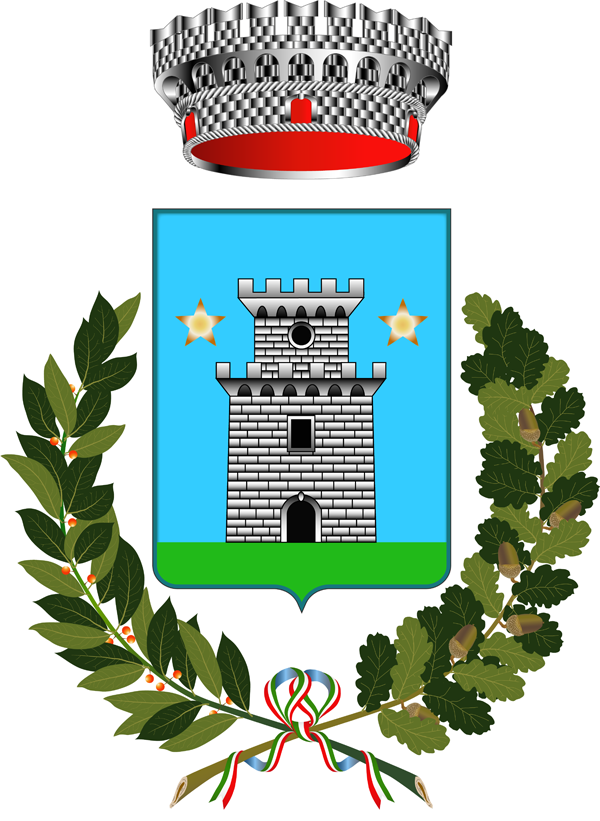
- Coat of arms

- Location within Italy Location within Abruzzo
- Coordinates: 42°19′1.3758″N 13°51′41.187″E
- Country: Italy
- Region: Abruzzo
- Province: Pescara (PE)
- Frazioni: Collevertieri, Cona, Pagliar di Tono, Peschiole, San Vito

Government
  - Mayor: Gino Di Bernardo (since 2022) (Lista Brittoni Domani)

Area
  - Total: 15.81 km^{2} (6.10 sq mi)
- Elevation: 779 m (2,556 ft)

Population (16 May 2024)
  - Total: 250
  - Density: 16/km^{2} (41/sq mi)
- Demonym: Brittolesi
- Time zone: UTC+1 (CET)
  - Summer (DST): UTC+2 (CEST)
- Postal code: 65010
- Dialing code: 085
- Website: Official website

Brittoli is a comune and town in the province of Pescara in the Abruzzo region of Italy. It is located in the Gran Sasso e Monti della Laga National Park.

== Main sights ==
- Torre of Forca di Penne
- Palazzo Pagliccia (17th century)
- Abbey of San Bartolomeo, in the nearby commune of Carpineto della Nora
