= Province of L'Aquila =

Province of L'Aquila Provincia dell'Aquila (Italian)
- Province
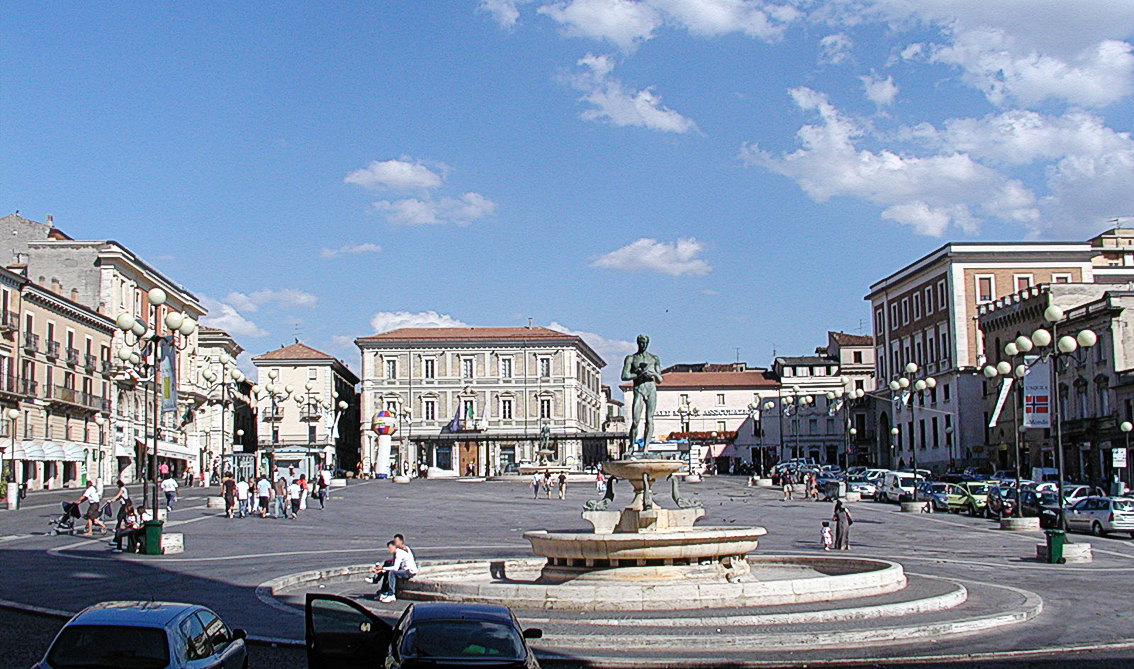
- Piazza del Duomo, L'Aquila

- Flag Coat of arms

- Location of the province of L'Aquila in Italy
- Country: Italy
- Region: Abruzzo
- Capital(s): L'Aquila
- Municipalities: 108

Government
  - President: Angelo Caruso

Area
  - Total: 5,047.55 km^{2} (1,948.87 sq mi)

Population (2026)
  - Total: 286,765
  - Density: 56.8127/km^{2} (147.144/sq mi)

GDP
  - Total: €7.286 billion (2015)
  - Per capita: €23,962 (2015)
- Time zone: UTC+1 (CET)
  - Summer (DST): UTC+2 (CEST)
- Postal code: 67100, 67010, 67012, 67013, 67014, 67015, 67017, 67019, 67020, 67021, 67022, 67023, 67024, 67025, 67026, 67027, 67028, 67029, 67030, 67031, 67032, 67033, 67034, 67035, 67036, 67037, 67038, 67039, 67040, 67041, 67043, 67044, 67045, 67046, 67047, 67048, 67049, 67050, 67051, 67052, 67053, 67054, 67055, 67056, 67057, 67058, 67059, 67060, 67061, 67062, 67063, 67064, 67066, 67067, 67068, 67069
- Telephone prefix: 0862, 0863, 0864
- Vehicle registration: AQ
- ISTAT code: 066

The Province of L'Aquila (Italian: provincia dell'Aquila) is the largest, most mountainous and least densely populated province of the region of Abruzzo in southern Italy. It comprises about half the landmass of Abruzzo and occupies the western part of the region. It has borders with the provinces of Teramo to the north, Pescara and Chieti to the east, Isernia (in Molise region) to the south and Frosinone, Rome and Rieti (in Lazio region) to the west. Its capital is the city of L'Aquila. It has a population of 286,765 in an area of 5,047.55 square kilometres (1,948.87 sq mi) across its 108 municipalities.

The province of L'Aquila includes the highest mountains of the Apennines (Gran Sasso, Maiella and Velino-Sirente), their highest peak, Corno Grande, the high plain of Campo Imperatore, and Europe's southernmost glacier, the Calderone. The province's major rivers are the Aterno-Pescara, Sangro, Liri, Salto, and the Turano; its major lakes are Lago Scanno and Lago Barrea. It once included the third largest lake on the Italian peninsula, Lago Fucino, which was drained in one of the 19th century's largest engineering projects. The lake basin is today a flourishing agricultural area and an important technological district. The province is known for its many castles, fortresses and pristine medieval hill towns.

== Municipalities ==
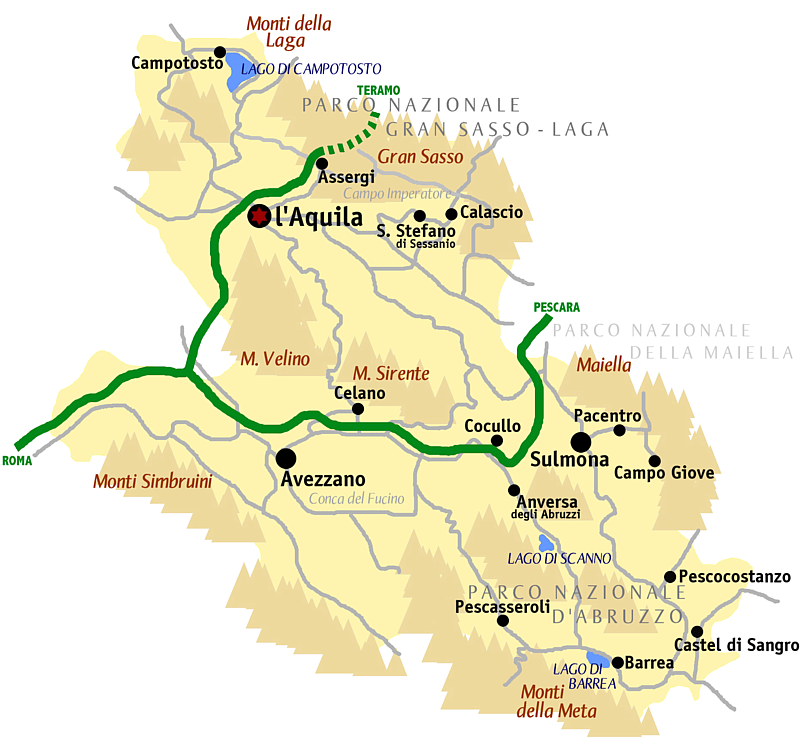
Map of the province

There are 108 municipalities in the province:

- Acciano
- Aielli
- Alfedena
- Anversa degli Abruzzi
- Ateleta
- Avezzano
- Balsorano
- Barete
- Barisciano
- Barrea
- Bisegna
- Bugnara
- Cagnano Amiterno
- Calascio
- Campo di Giove
- Campotosto
- Canistro
- Cansano
- Capestrano
- Capistrello
- Capitignano
- Caporciano
- Cappadocia
- Carapelle Calvisio
- Carsoli
- Castel del Monte
- Castel di Ieri
- Castel di Sangro
- Castellafiume
- Castelvecchio Calvisio
- Castelvecchio Subequo
- Celano
- Cerchio
- Civita d'Antino
- Civitella Alfedena
- Civitella Roveto
- Cocullo
- Collarmele
- Collelongo
- Collepietro
- Corfinio
- Fagnano Alto
- Fontecchio
- Fossa
- Gagliano Aterno
- Gioia dei Marsi
- Goriano Sicoli
- Introdacqua
- L'Aquila
- Lecce nei Marsi
- Luco dei Marsi
- Lucoli
- Magliano de' Marsi
- Massa d'Albe
- Molina Aterno
- Montereale
- Morino
- Navelli
- Ocre
- Ofena
- Opi
- Oricola
- Ortona dei Marsi
- Ortucchio
- Ovindoli
- Pacentro
- Pereto
- Pescasseroli
- Pescina
- Pescocostanzo
- Pettorano sul Gizio
- Pizzoli
- Poggio Picenze
- Prata d'Ansidonia
- Pratola Peligna
- Prezza
- Raiano
- Rivisondoli
- Rocca di Botte
- Rocca di Cambio
- Rocca di Mezzo
- Rocca Pia
- Roccacasale
- Roccaraso
- San Benedetto dei Marsi
- San Benedetto in Perillis
- San Demetrio ne' Vestini
- San Pio delle Camere
- San Vincenzo Valle Roveto
- Sant'Eusanio Forconese
- Sante Marie
- Santo Stefano di Sessanio
- Scanno
- Scontrone
- Scoppito
- Scurcola Marsicana
- Secinaro
- Sulmona
- Tagliacozzo
- Tione degli Abruzzi
- Tornimparte
- Trasacco
- Villa Sant'Angelo
- Villa Santa Lucia degli Abruzzi
- Villalago
- Villavallelonga
- Villetta Barrea
- Vittorito

== Demographics ==
Historical population
Year	Pop.	±%
1861	282,473	—
1871	300,114	+6.2%
1881	324,514	+8.1%
1901	360,789	+11.2%
1911	377,550	+4.6%
1921	374,057	−0.9%
1931	366,858	−1.9%
1936	365,716	−0.3%
1951	365,077	−0.2%
1961	328,989	−9.9%
1971	293,066	−10.9%
1981	291,742	−0.5%
1991	297,838	+2.1%
2001	297,424	−0.1%
2011	298,343	+0.3%
2021	288,956	−3.1%
Source: ISTAT

As of 2026, the population is 286,765, of which 50.0% are male, and 50.0% are female. Minors make up 13.5% of the population, and seniors make up 27.4%.

=== Immigration ===
As of 2025, immigrants make up 12.4% of the population. The 5 largest foreign countries of birth are Romania, Morocco, North Macedonia, Albania, and Venezuela.

== Economy ==
The province's two major cities, L'Aquila and Avezzano, have had rapid economic expansion since the late 20th century, with the growth of transportation manufacturing, telecommunications, and computer industries.

Throughout most of the 20th century, there were serious population declines in the rural areas, with the near collapse of the province's pastoral agricultural economy, as people moved to cities for work. Since the founding of the Gran Sasso e Monti della Laga and Majella national parks, and the Sirente-Velino Regional Park, tourists have been attracted to the mountainous landscapes. Tourism and associated services have boosted the economy of rural L'Aquila and begun to reverse its population decline.

== Earthquakes ==
Earthquakes mark the history of the province, especially its capital city L'Aquila. The city suffered earthquakes in the 14th, 15th, and 16th centuries, followed by the 1703 Apennine earthquakes and most recently on 6 April 2009. This caused extensive damage to the city and areas of the province just outside L'Aquila, particularly along SS 17. It also resulted in the deaths of 308 people, injured about 1,500, and left over 66,000 unhoused. At 01:32 GMT (03:32 CEST) on 6 April, an earthquake of 6.3 magnitude struck central Italy with its epicentre near L'Aquila, at 42.4228°N 13.3945°E.

== Main sights ==
=== L' Aquila ===
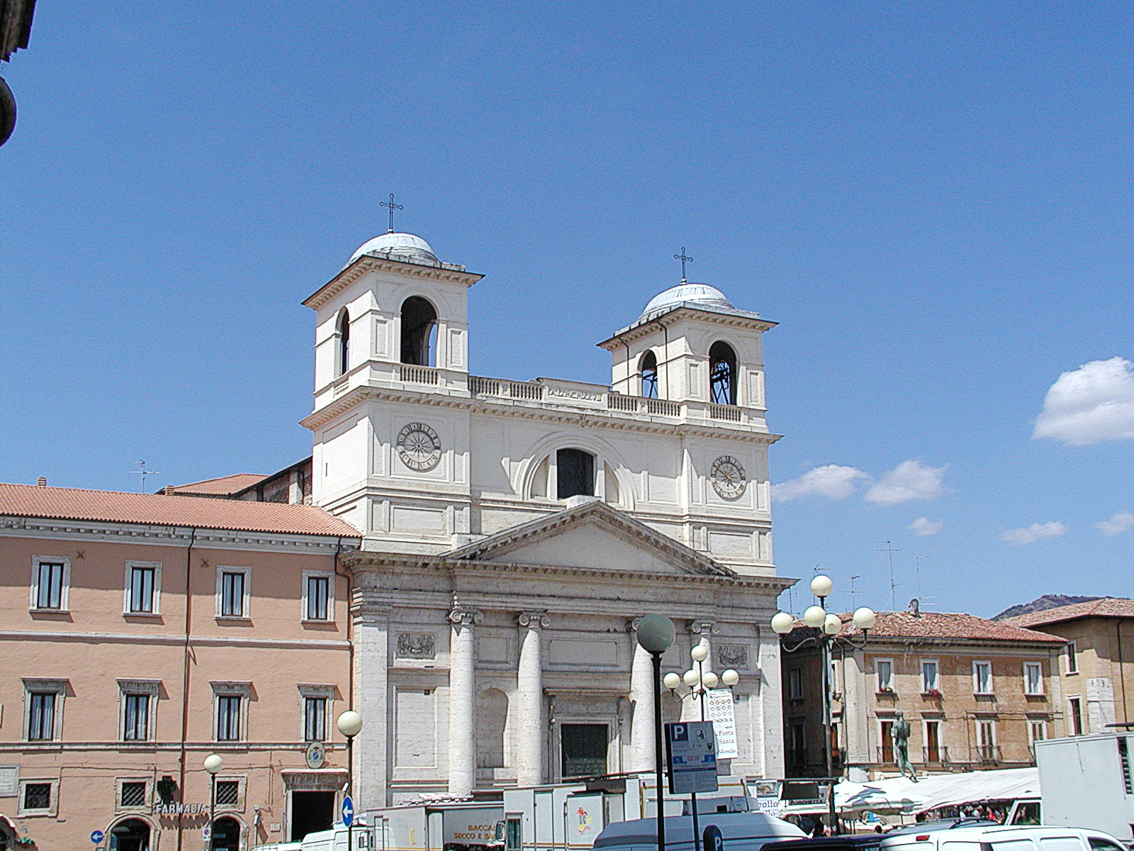
L'Aquila Cathedral

Tourists in L'Aquila come mostly from Italy.

In the highest part of the town is the massive Spanish Fort (Forte Spagnolo), erected by the Spanish viceroy Don Pedro de Toledo in 1534. It is currently home to the National Museum of Abruzzo.

L'Aquila Cathedral, dedicated to Saint Maximus of Aveia (San Massimo), was built in the 13th century, but crumbled down during the 1703 earthquake. The most recent façade is from the 19th century, but after the earthquake of 2009 and subsequent aftershocks the transept and possibly more of the cathedral has collapsed.

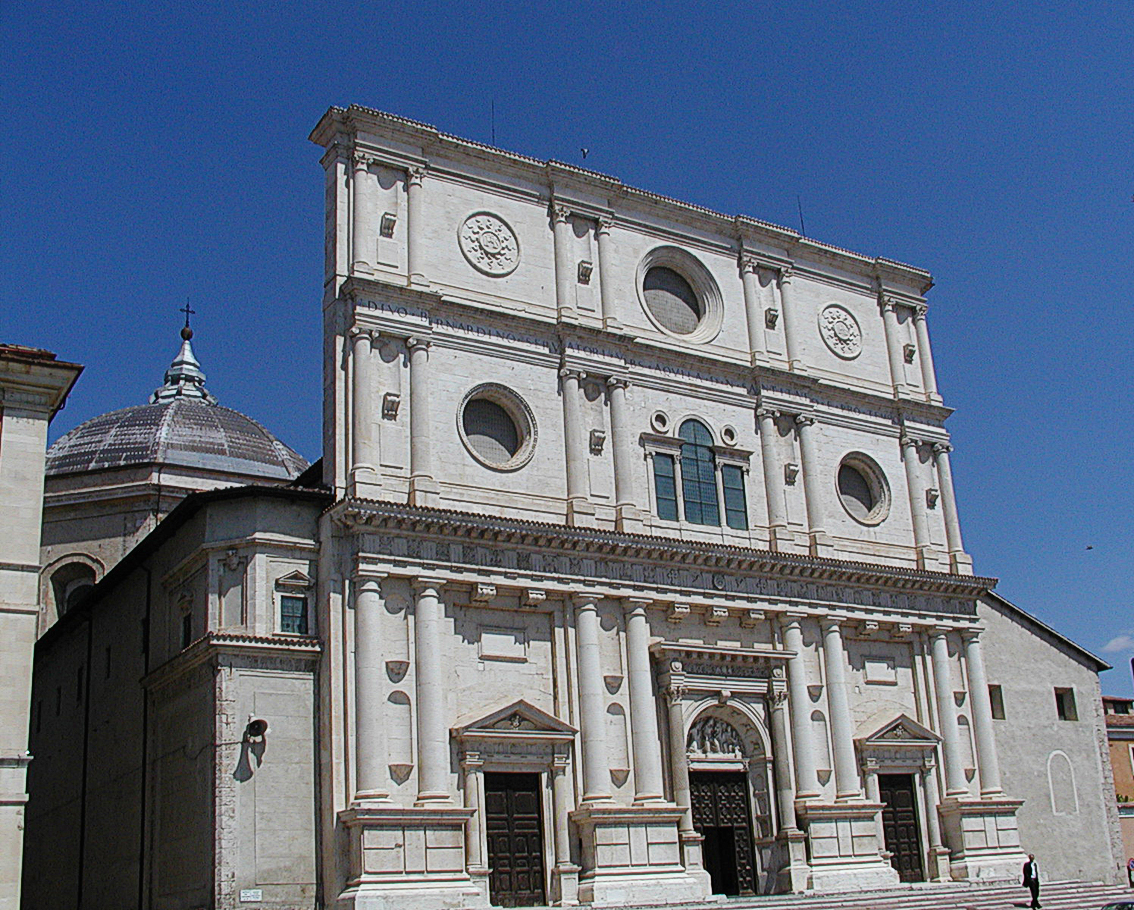
Basilica of San Bernardino

The Basilica of San Bernardino (1472) has a fine Renaissance façade by Nicolò Filotesio (commonly called Cola dell'Amatrice), and contains the monumental tomb of the saint, decorated with beautiful sculptures, and executed by Silvestro Ariscola in 1480.

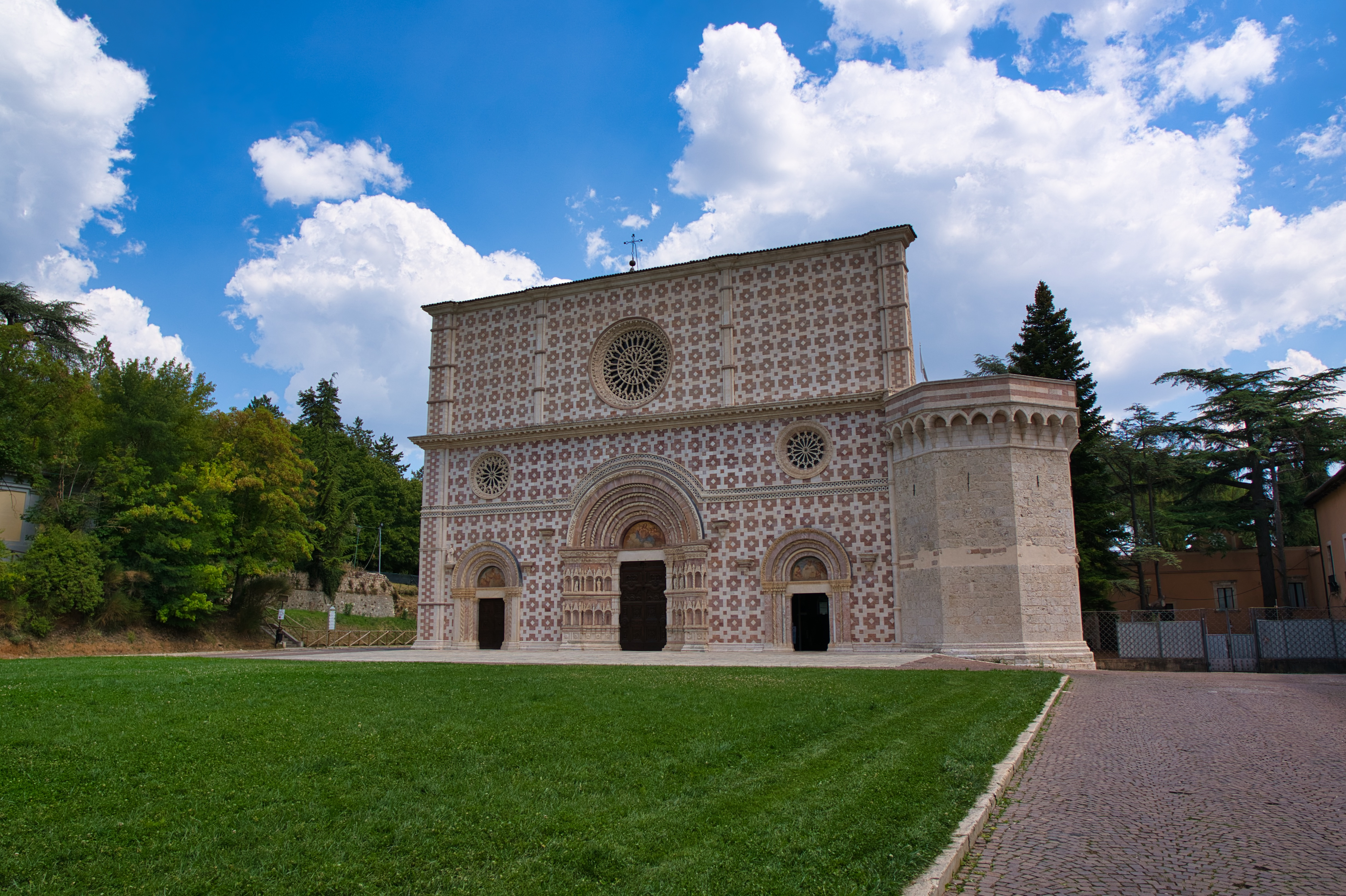
Santa Maria di Collemaggio

The church of Santa Maria di Collemaggio, just outside the town, has a very fine Romanesque façade of simple design (1270–1280) in red and white marble, with three finely decorated portals and a rose-window above each. The two side doors are also fine. The interior contains the mausoleum of Pope Celestine V erected in 1517. Many smaller churches in the town have similar façades (S. Giusta, S. Silvestro and others).

The town also contains some fine palaces: the municipality has a museum, with a collection of Roman inscriptions and some illuminated service books. The Palazzi Dragonetti and Persichetti contain private collections of pictures. Outside the town is the Fontana delle novantanove cannelle, a fountain with ninety-nine jets distributed along three walls, constructed in 1272. The source of the fountain is still unknown.

A well-known city landmark is the Fontana Luminosa ("Luminous Fountain"), a sculpture of two women bearing large jars, built in the 1930s. The local cemetery includes the grave of Karl Heinrich Ulrichs, a 19th‑century German gay rights pioneer who lived in L'Aquila; every year, gay people from all over the world meet at the cemetery to honour his memory.

The surrounding area boasts Roman ruins (the important Roman city of Amiternum), ancient monasteries, and numerous castles. The best-known of these is Rocca Calascio (used in the 1980s as the location for the movie Ladyhawke), which is the highest castle in Italy and one of the highest in Europe. Also nearby are several ski resorts like Gran Sasso d'Italia, the highest of the Apennines where in its valley the movie The Name of the Rose was filmed in the end of the 1980s.

=== Sulmona ===
Sulmona has various piazzas, churches and palaces of historical and touristic interest. Some of these include:

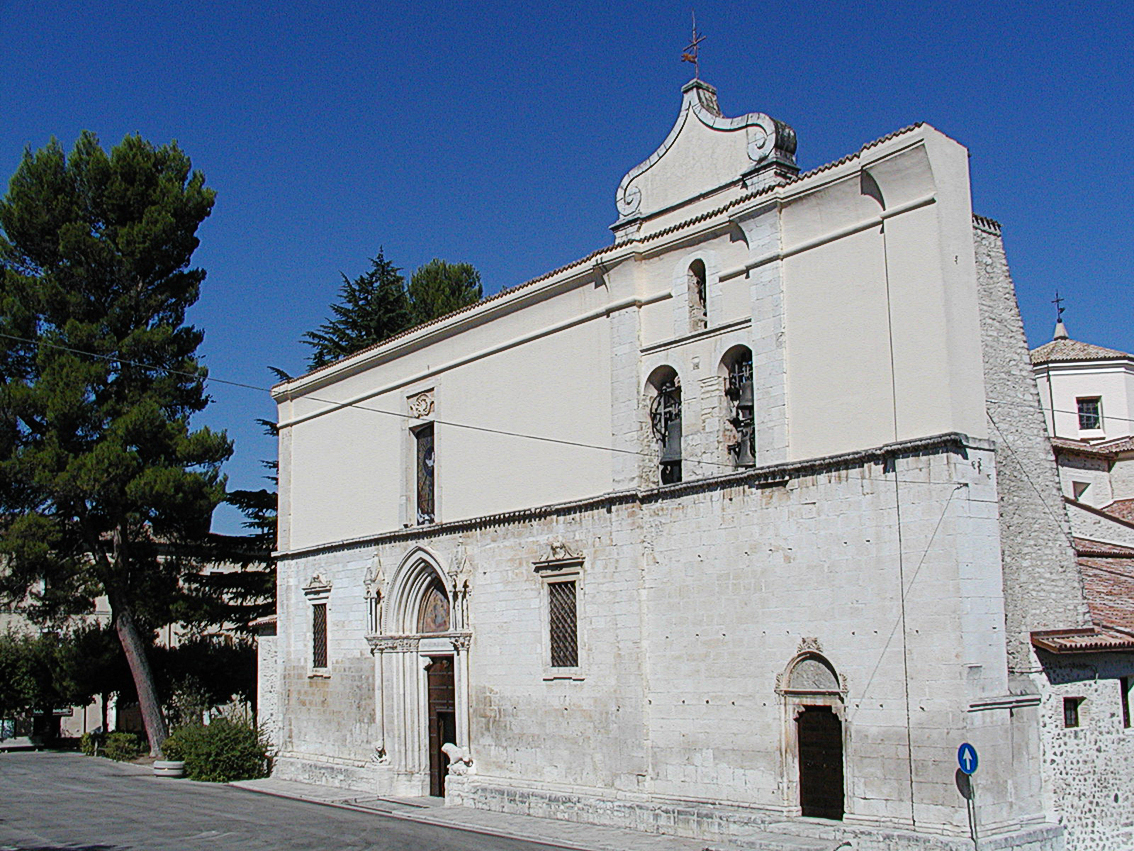
Sulmona Cathedral

- Sulmona Cathedral, located on the northwest side of the old city and was built on the site of a Roman temple. It contains a crypt which retains its Romanesque appearance despite the 18th-century renovation of the main church.
- Piazza XX Settembre. One of the main squares of the city, including a bronze statue of the Roman poet Ovid.
- Corso Ovidio. The city's main thoroughfare connects the cathedral and the major piazzas and is lined by elegant covered arcades, shops, cafes, palaces and churches.
- Palazzo Annunziata and Chiesa della SS. Annunziata. The Palace, one of the rare examples of late medieval/early Renaissance architecture in Sulmona that survived the earthquake of 1706. Its facade contains fine sculpture and tracery work. Inside the Palazzo is a museum showing the Roman history of the city as well as various artifacts. The church is a fine example of Baroque architecture and has a beautiful interior and bell tower.
- Piazza Garibaldi is the largest square in town with a large baroque era fountain. A Palio style medieval festival and horse race known as the Giostra Cavalleresca takes place here every year in the Summer. At Easter, crowds gather to witness the Madonna che Scappa. This ceremony involves the procession of a statue of the Madonna which is carried across the square while the bearers run to encounter a statue of the resurrected Christ on the other side of the square. On the south side of the Piazza is the 12th Century Gothic aqueduct. The square hosts a market twice each week on Wednesdays and Saturdays.

The remains of the ancient city are of little interest as ruins, but indicate the existence of a considerable town; among them are the vestiges of an amphitheatre, a theatre, and thermae, all of them located outside the gates of the modern city. About 3 km from the city, at the foot of Monte Morrone, are some ruins of reticulated masonry, traditionally believed to be Ovid's villa. Today, they are more properly identified as the sanctuary of Hercules Curinus. Nearby is the Badia Morronese, a large (c. 119 × 140 m) religious complex located near Pope Celestine V's hermitage. It was founded by Celestine as a chapel in 1241, and was enlarged and later made into a convent.

=== Rocca Calascio ===
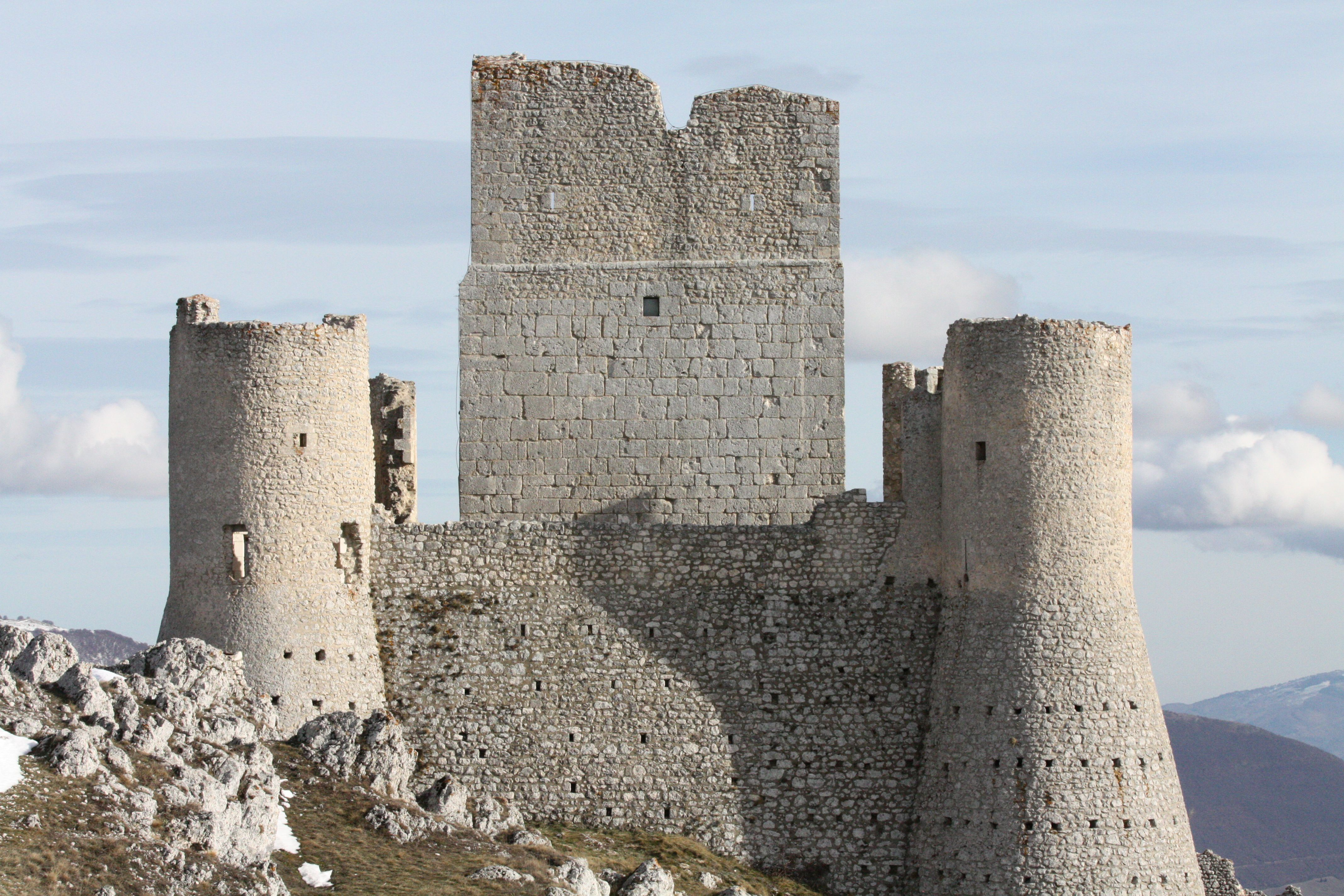
Rocca Calascio

The Rocca Calascio is a mountaintop fortress or rocca in the municipality of Calascio. At an elevation of 1,512 metres (4,961 ft), the castle is the highest fortress in the Apennines. Built of stone and masonry exclusively for military purposes and intended only to accommodate troops and never as residence for nobles, the fortress overlooks the Plain of Navelli at one of the highest points in the ancient Barony of Carapelle.

Construction of the fortress started in the tenth century as a single watchtower. A walled courtyard with four cylindrical towers at the corners around a taller inner tower was added in the thirteenth century. The lower half of the fortress is built with distinctively larger stones than its upper half. It is believed that this feature was to make its base impenetrable to invaders. The fortress was never tested in battle. However, it was badly damaged in November 1461 by an earthquake with an estimated magnitude of 7 to 8 on the Richter Scale. While the town of Calascio, which lies below the fortress, was rebuilt, the fortress was not.

=== Avezzano ===
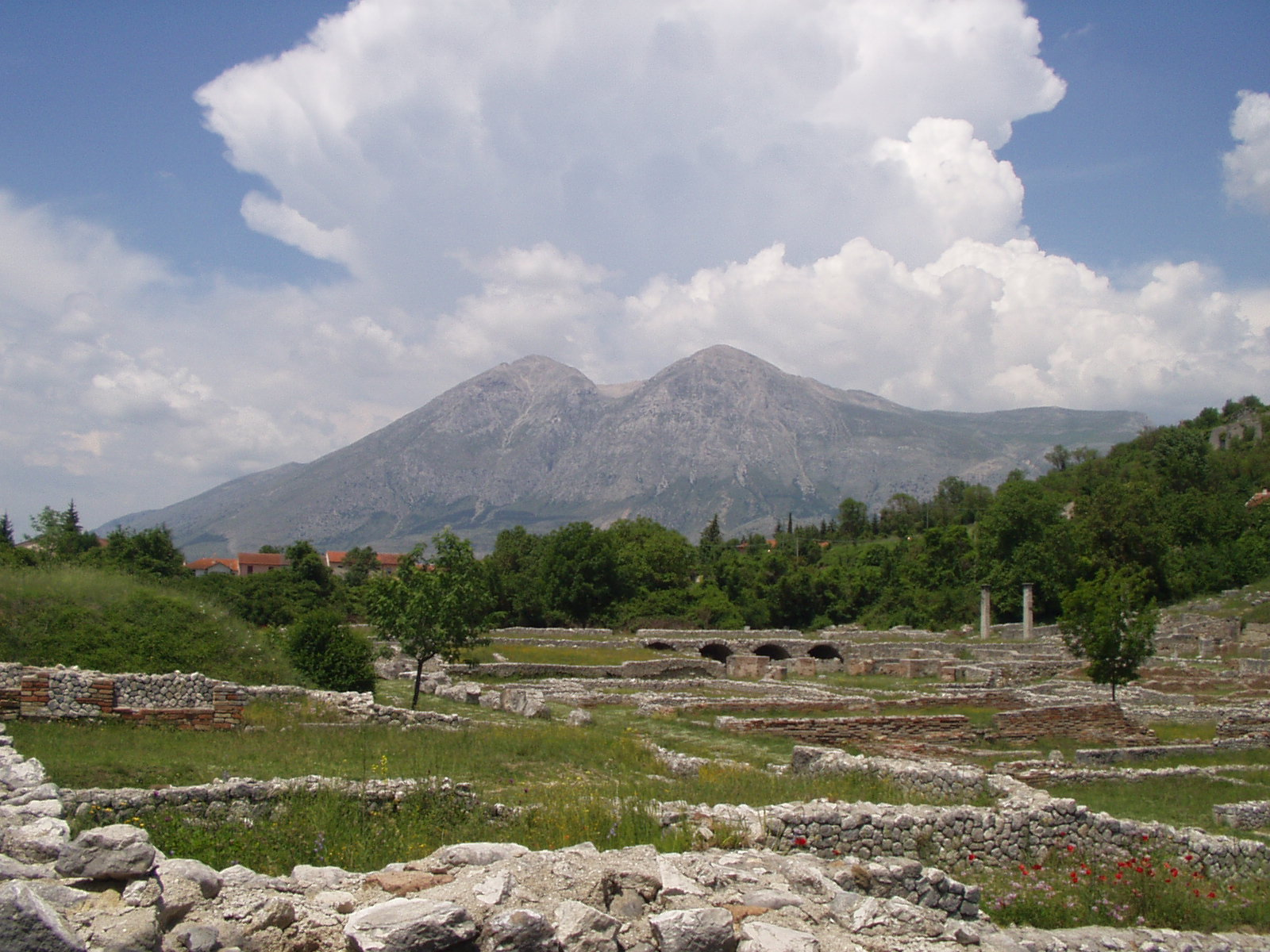
The remains of the ancient Roman site of Alba Fucens

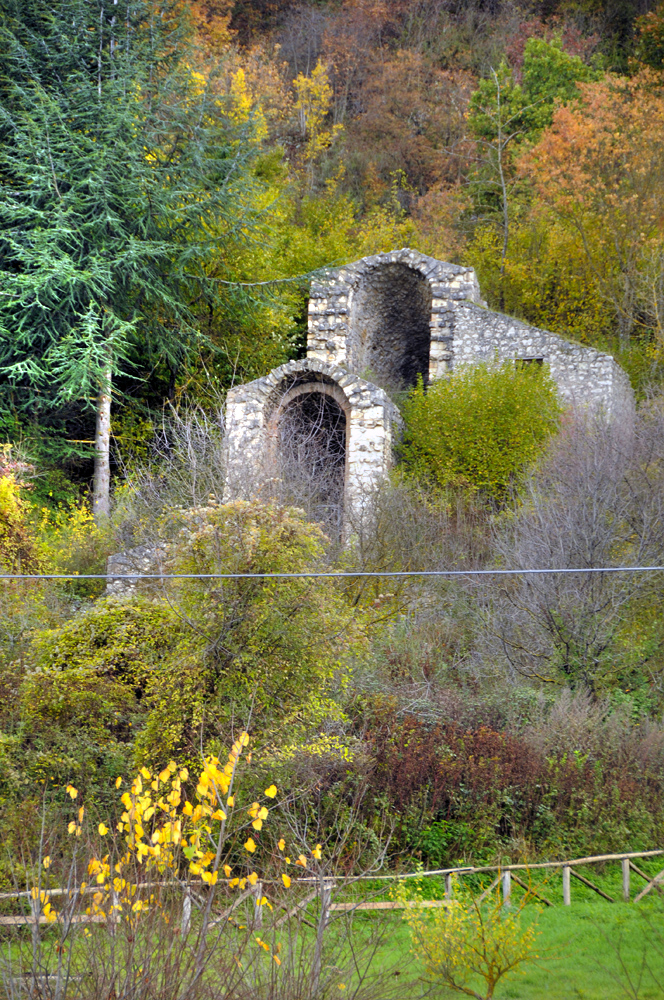
Tunnels of Claudius

Avezzano, having been completely destroyed by the earthquake of 1915, has no monuments of particular interest as do other locations in the region of Abruzzo. However, you can see some important remains of its ancient history. The remains of the ancient Roman site of Alba Fucens are located 7 kilometers north of the city.

The Castello Orsini-Colonna was built in 1490 by Gentile Virginio Orsini, who had it built around a pre-existing medieval tower of the twelfth century; it is square, with round towers at the angles. The castle project was probably led by the engineer Francesco di Giorgio Martini. In the sixteenth century the castle was expanded by the order of Marcantonio Colonna, becoming an elegant residence. Severely damaged by the earthquake of 1915, it was partially restored after 1990.

The Tunnels of Claudius are located south of the city. They were built by the emperor Claudius between 41 and 52 AD by which the emperor made the first attempts at draining the huge Lake Fucino. To create the tunnels and the main gallery, 25,000 slaves were needed. They dug 32 wells and six tunnels. The lake was largely drained, but with the fall of the Roman Empire the tunnels were obstructed and the lake returned to its previous levels. Many centuries later, Alessandro Torlonia completed the work by finally draining Lake Fucino, building on the original project of the emperor Claudius and turning the land under the great lake into a fertile plain. In 1977, the tunnels were opened as an archaeological park.

The Avezzano Cathedral was built in 1000 and documented in the thirteenth century. After its destruction as a result of the earthquake of 1915, it was rebuilt after 1940 in the new central square of Avezzano. The facade is neo-Renaissance travertine. The three portals are topped with mosaics depicting Christ and the two protectors of Avezzano, the Virgin Mary and St. Bartholomew. The church inside presents three large naves and a valuable organ placed in the church in 1955.

The original Sanctuary of the Madonna di Pietraquaria was destroyed by Charles I of Anjou after the battle of Tagliacozzo in 1268 and rebuilt a few centuries later. In 1915, it did not suffer serious damage and was home to many survivors of the quake.
