= San Pietro ad Oratorium Abbey =

Church in Capestrano, Italy

Coordinates: 42.246621°N 13.806182°E

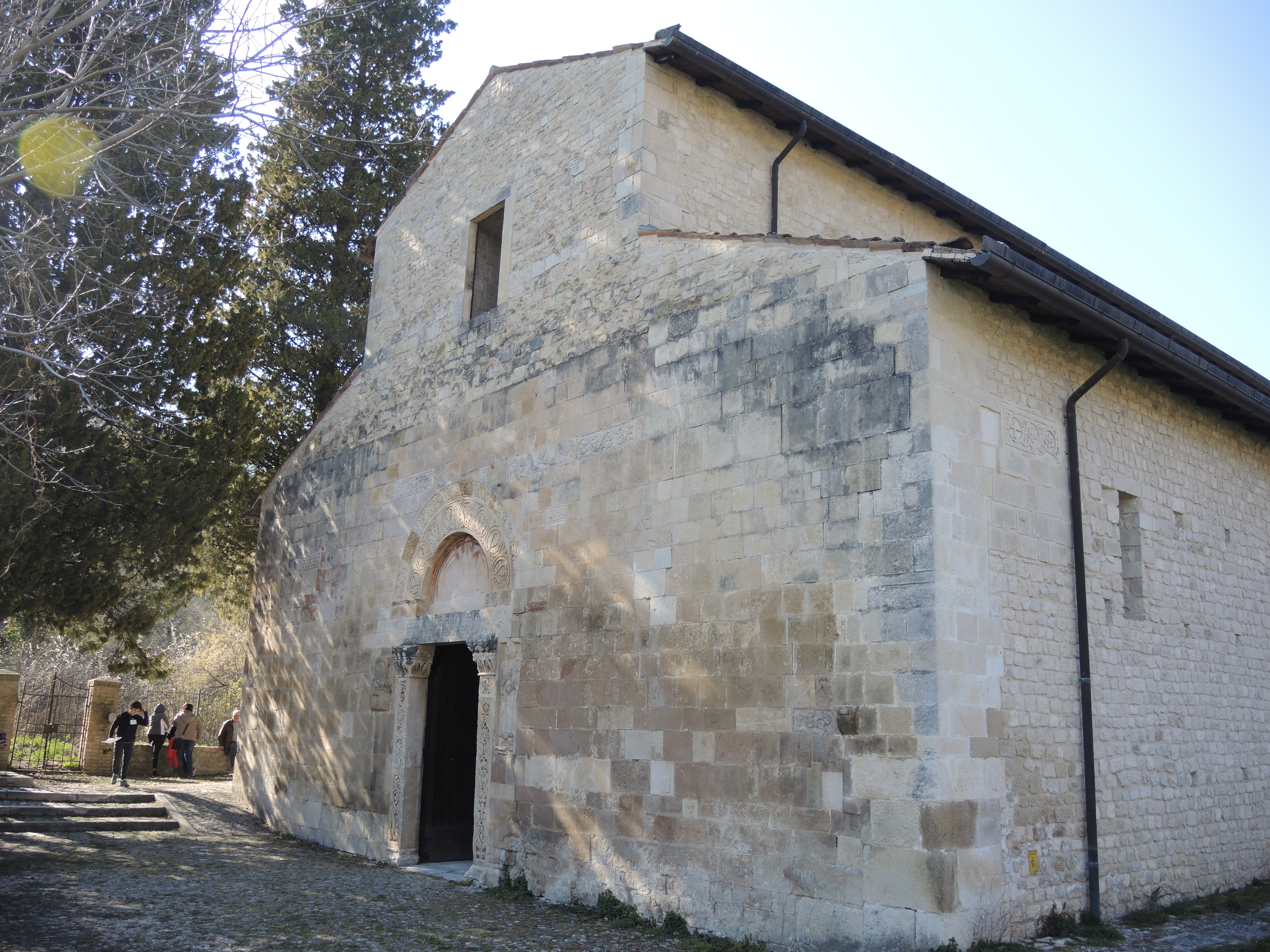
The façade of the church

San Pietro ad Oratorium is the name of a Romanesque-style Roman Catholic church, and formerly of an adjacent Benedictine monastery, now in ruins, located on a rural mountainside near the banks of the Tirino river, about 6 km from the town of Capestrano, in the region of Abruzzo, central Italy.

== History and description ==
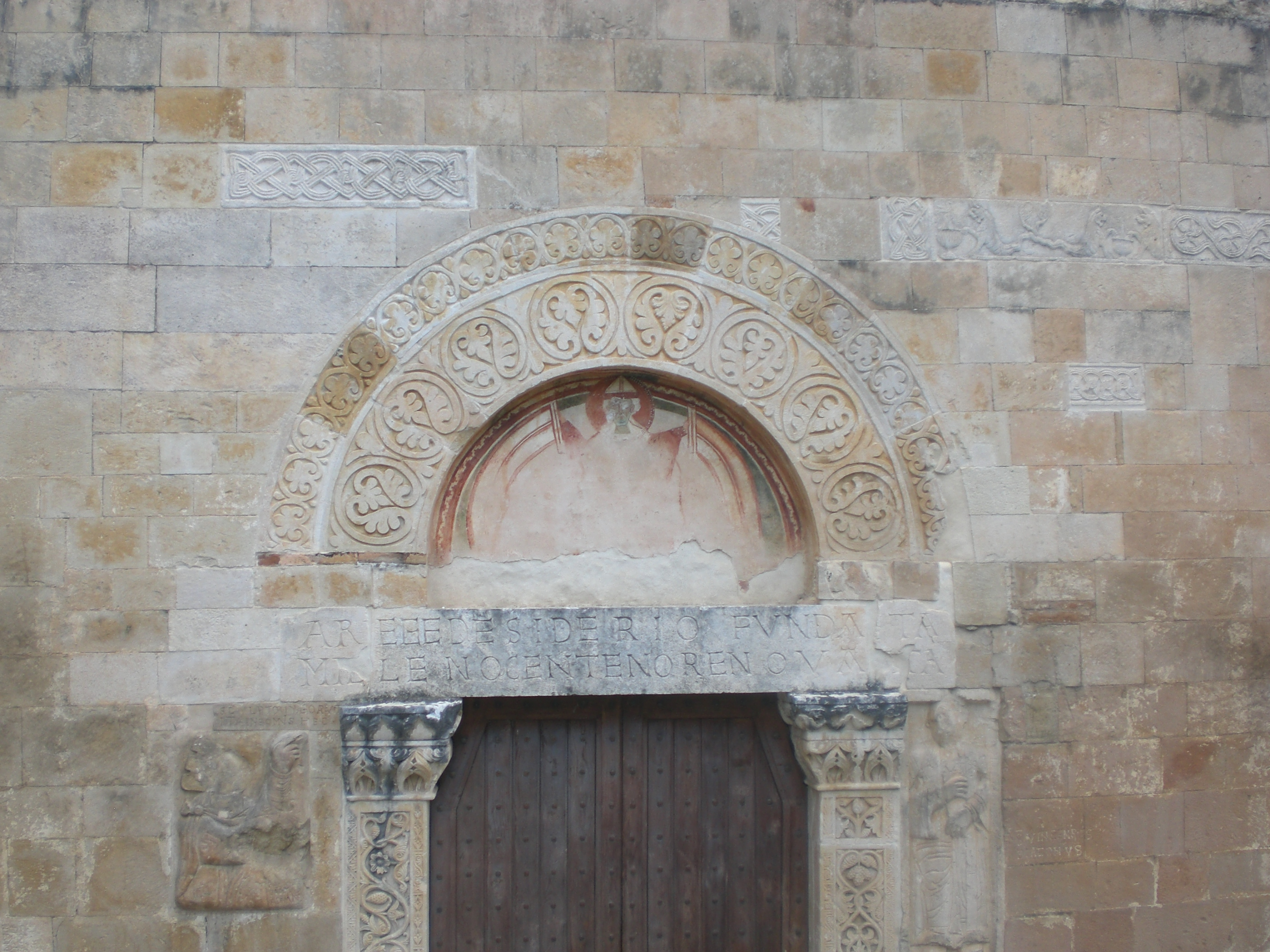
Main door of the church with floral and foliate voussoirs (the carved stone arch blocks)

Chronicles suggest that some church structure might have been present by the 7th century, but the original abbey was commissioned in AD 752 by the Lombard king Desiderius and made subservient to the monastery of San Vincenzo al Volturno. In 1117, the church was consecrated by Pope Paschal II and had acquired more independence and wealth as an abbey.

The present church building was initially erected in the 12th century; of the monastery buildings little remains but ruins, in part due to abandonment and also because of recurrent floods. This partially reconstructed church has a nave, two side aisles, and three semicircular apses. There is only one entrance door, with an arch above the lintel that is decorated with floral and foliate motifs. On the Romanesque portal were added two marble reliefs with the figures of David and St Vincent of Saragossa. Some of the addition appears to be from an earlier structure. The façade has a marble square inscription of the Sator Square in Latin. In the 15th century the abbey was abandoned by the monks.

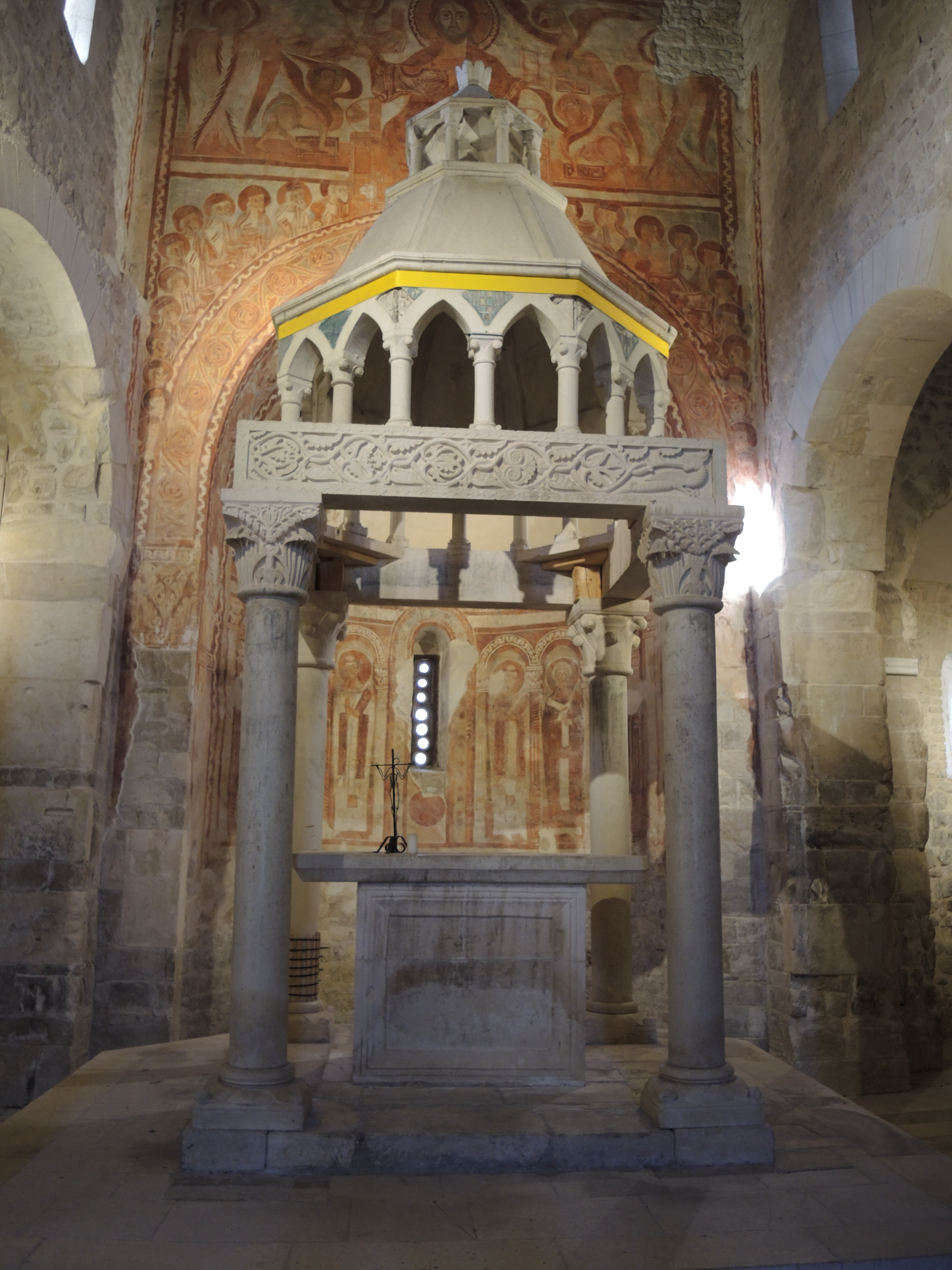
Interior of the Apse showing the ciborium

The interior is notable for the robust stone arches that line the nave (right). The main altar is underneath a domed ciborium. The walls of the central apse support a remarkable 12th-century fresco depicting Christ among the twelve disciples, above a register with the Twenty-Four Elders from the Book of Revelation.
