= Barete =

- Comune
- Comune di Barete
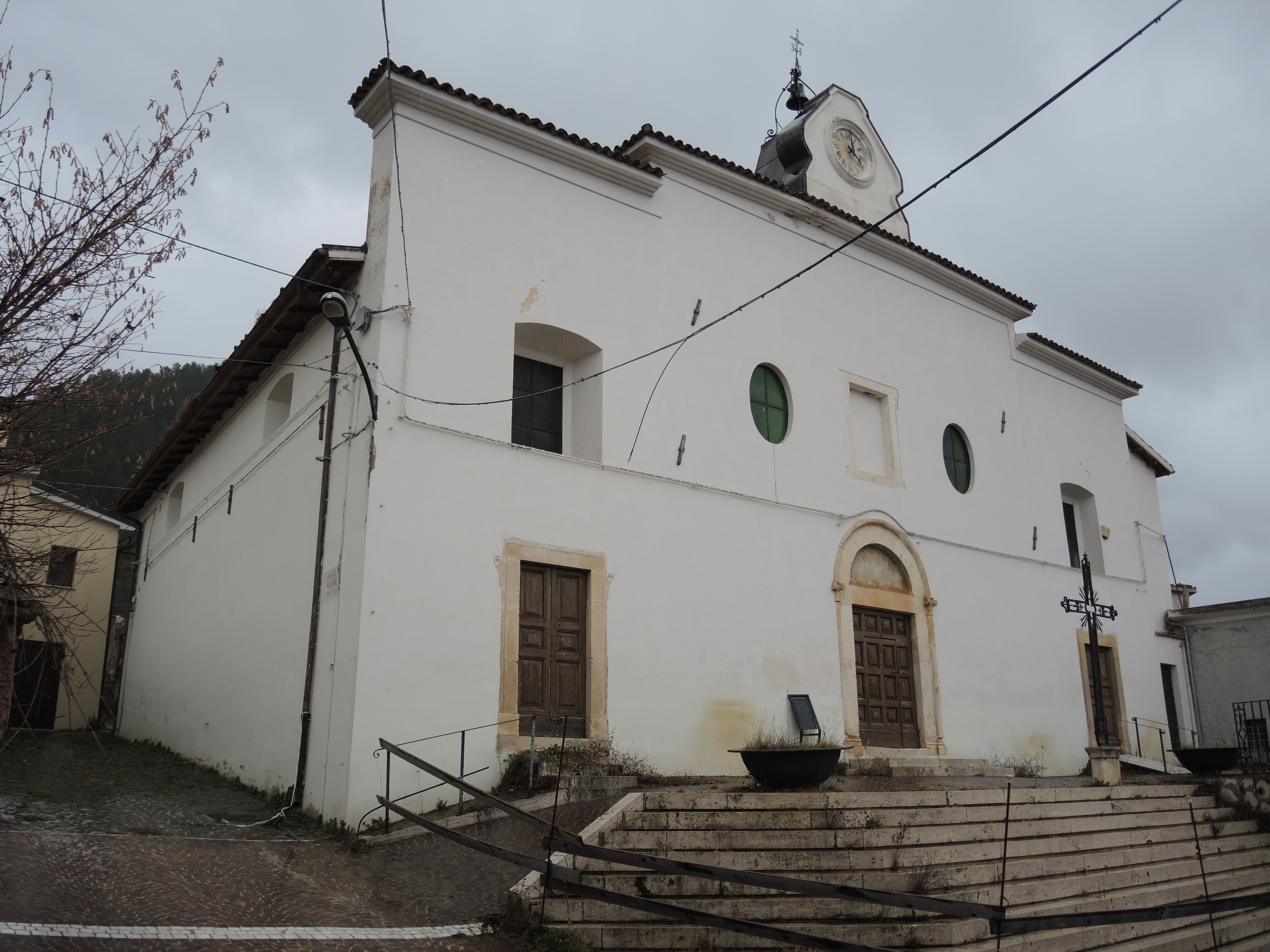

- Coat of arms

- Location within Italy Location within Abruzzo
- Coordinates: 42°27′5″N 13°16′59″E
- Country: Italy
- Region: Abruzzo
- Province: L'Aquila (AQ)
- Frazioni: Basanello, Colli, San Sabino, Sant'Eusanio, Tarignano, Teora

Government
  - Mayor: Leonardo Gattuso

Area
  - Total: 24.59 km^{2} (9.49 sq mi)
- Elevation: 800 m (2,600 ft)

Population (30 April 2017)
  - Total: 719
  - Density: 29.2/km^{2} (75.7/sq mi)
- Demonym: Baretani
- Time zone: UTC+1 (CET)
  - Summer (DST): UTC+2 (CEST)
- Postal code: 67010
- Dialing code: 0862
- Patron saint: St. Vitus
- Saint day: 15 June
- Website: Official website

Barete (Sabino: Lavarète) is a comune and town in the province of L'Aquila in the Abruzzo region of Italy. It is located in the Gran Sasso e Monti della Laga National Park.
