= Will Corvara =

Spanish photographer and writer

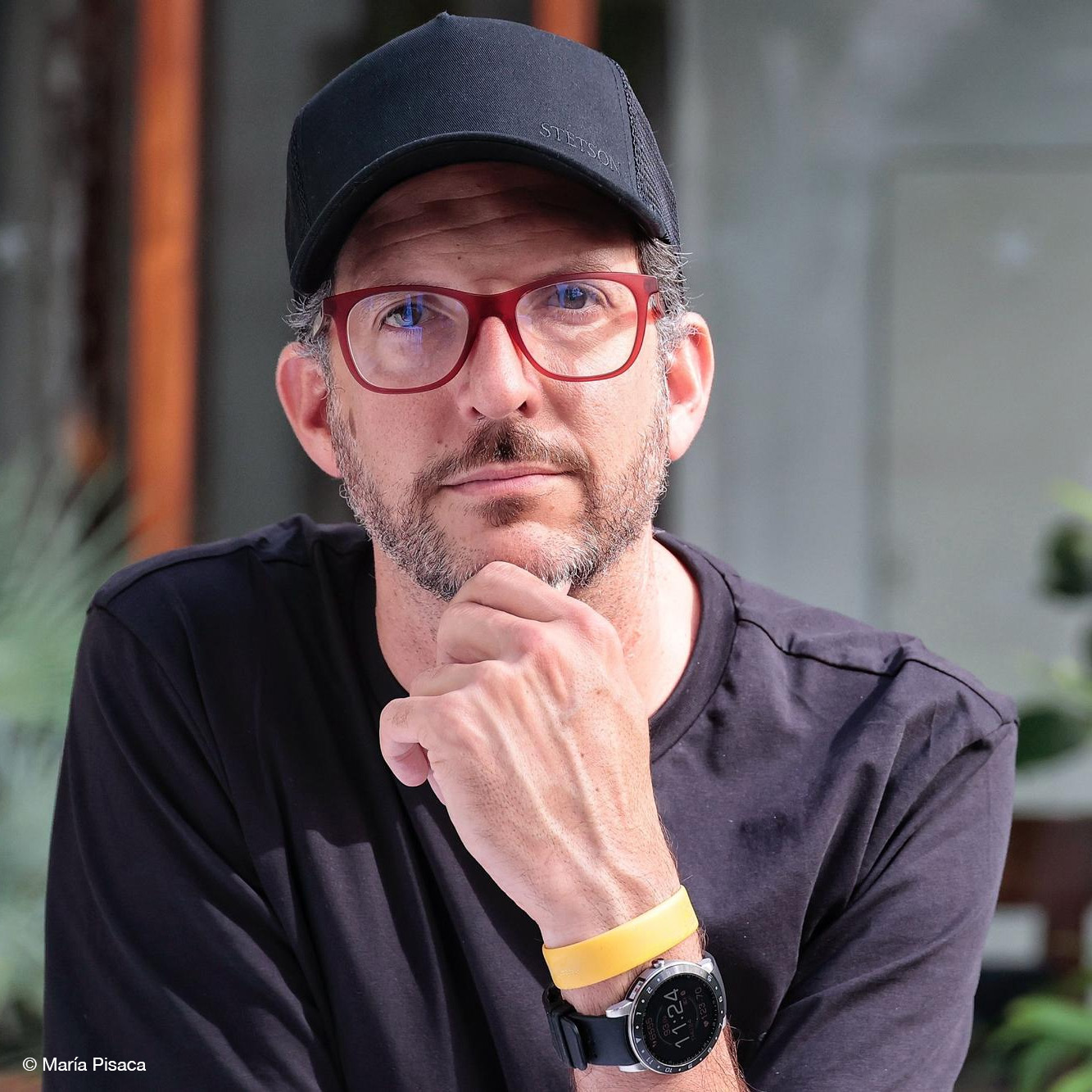
- Will Corvara
- Born: 1983 (age 42–43); Madrid, Spain
- Citizenship: Spain
- Occupations: Photographer, writer
- Website: www.willcorvara.com

Will Corvara (born 1983) is a Spanish photographer and writer from Madrid. In a 2023 feature, El Independiente compared the treatment of light and shadow in his work to that of Caravaggio and his followers.

Corvara has presented the solo exhibitions Island (Iberostar Heritage Grand Mencey, Santa Cruz de Tenerife) and Botanical (Museo Insular de La Palma) in 2024, and showed Melting Humanity at the Ateneo de Madrid in December 2024. In 2026, his work was included in the group exhibition The Blue of Distance at Kingston Gallery (Boston).

In 2025, Corvara published El fotógrafo ilustrado (Anaya Multimedia/PhotoClub), a book on how to improve photographic techniques. Forbes España included him among ten Spanish photographer-artists highlighted in 2025.

== Selected exhibitions ==
- Island — Iberostar Heritage Grand Mencey, Santa Cruz de Tenerife (2024)
- Botanical — Museo Insular de La Palma, Santa Cruz de La Palma (2024)
- Melting Humanity — Ateneo de Madrid, Madrid (2024)
- The Blue of Distance (group) — Kingston Gallery, Boston (2026)

== Publications ==
- El fotógrafo ilustrado (Anaya Multimedia/PhotoClub, 2025)
