= Cagnano Amiterno =

- Comune
- Comune di Cagnano Amiterno
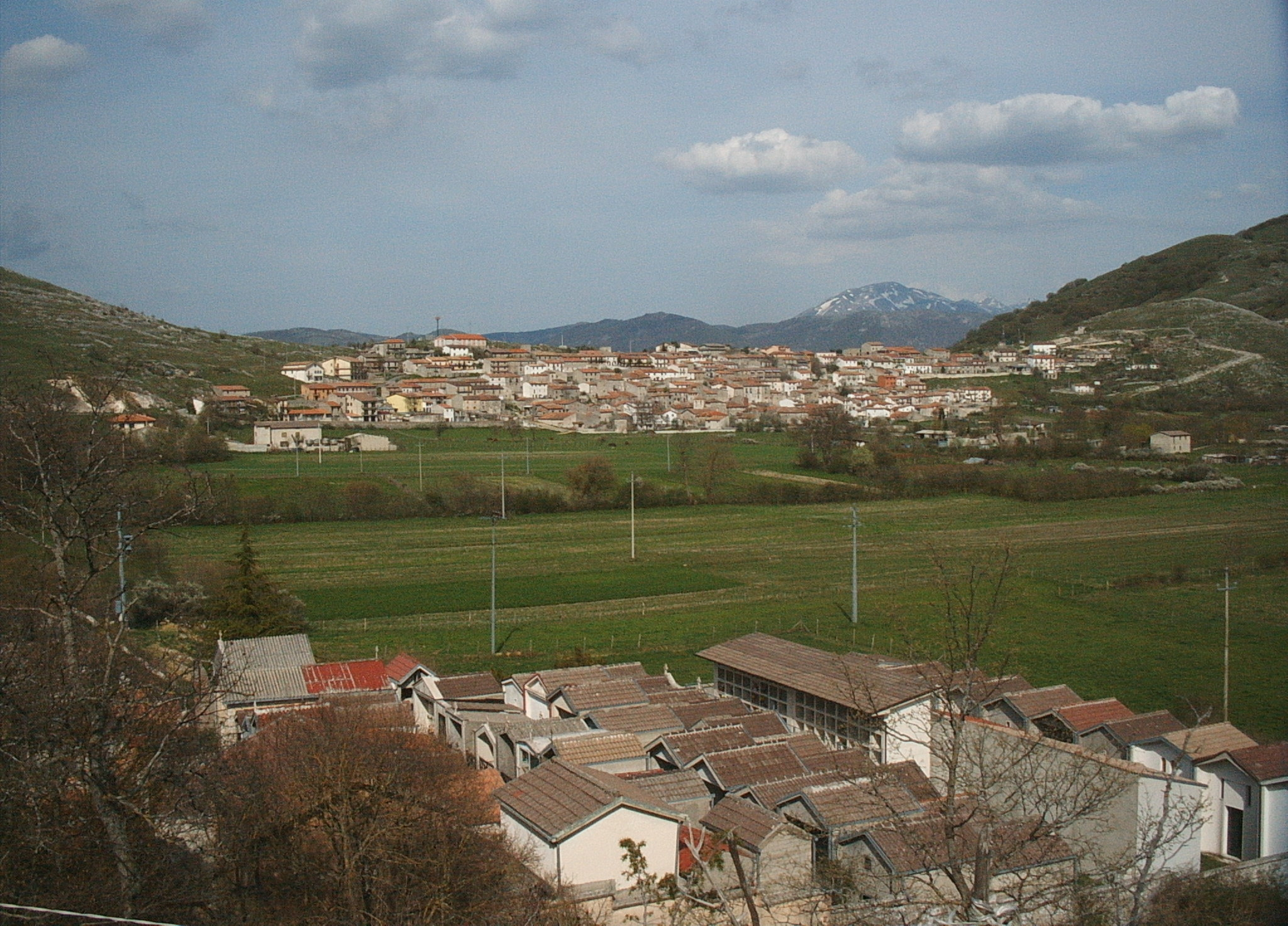

- Location within Italy Location within Abruzzo
- Coordinates: 42°27′30″N 13°13′44″E
- Country: Italy
- Region: Abruzzo
- Province: L'Aquila (AQ)
- Frazioni: Cascina, Civitella, Colle, Collicello, Corroccioni, Fiugni, Fossatillo, Sala, San Cosimo, San Giovanni, San Pelino, Termine, Torre

Government
  - Mayor: Iside Di Martino

Area
  - Total: 60.12 km^{2} (23.21 sq mi)
- Elevation: 841 m (2,759 ft)

Population (26 April 2024)
  - Total: 1,106
  - Density: 18.40/km^{2} (47.65/sq mi)
- Demonym: Cagnanesi
- Time zone: UTC+1 (CET)
  - Summer (DST): UTC+2 (CEST)
- Postal code: 67012
- Dialing code: 0862
- Patron saint: Sts. Cosmas and Damian
- Saint day: September 26

Cagnano Amiterno is a town and comune (municipality) in the Province of L'Aquila in the Abruzzo region of central–southern Italy. It is located in the Gran Sasso and Monti della Laga National Park.

Cagnano was the seat of the former Latin Catholic bishopric of Amiterno. The toponym of Sala, one of the frazioni (boroughs) in the comune, may suggest the area was a Lombard settlement.
