= Villa Santa Lucia degli Abruzzi =

- Comune
- Comune di Villa Santa Lucia degli Abruzzi
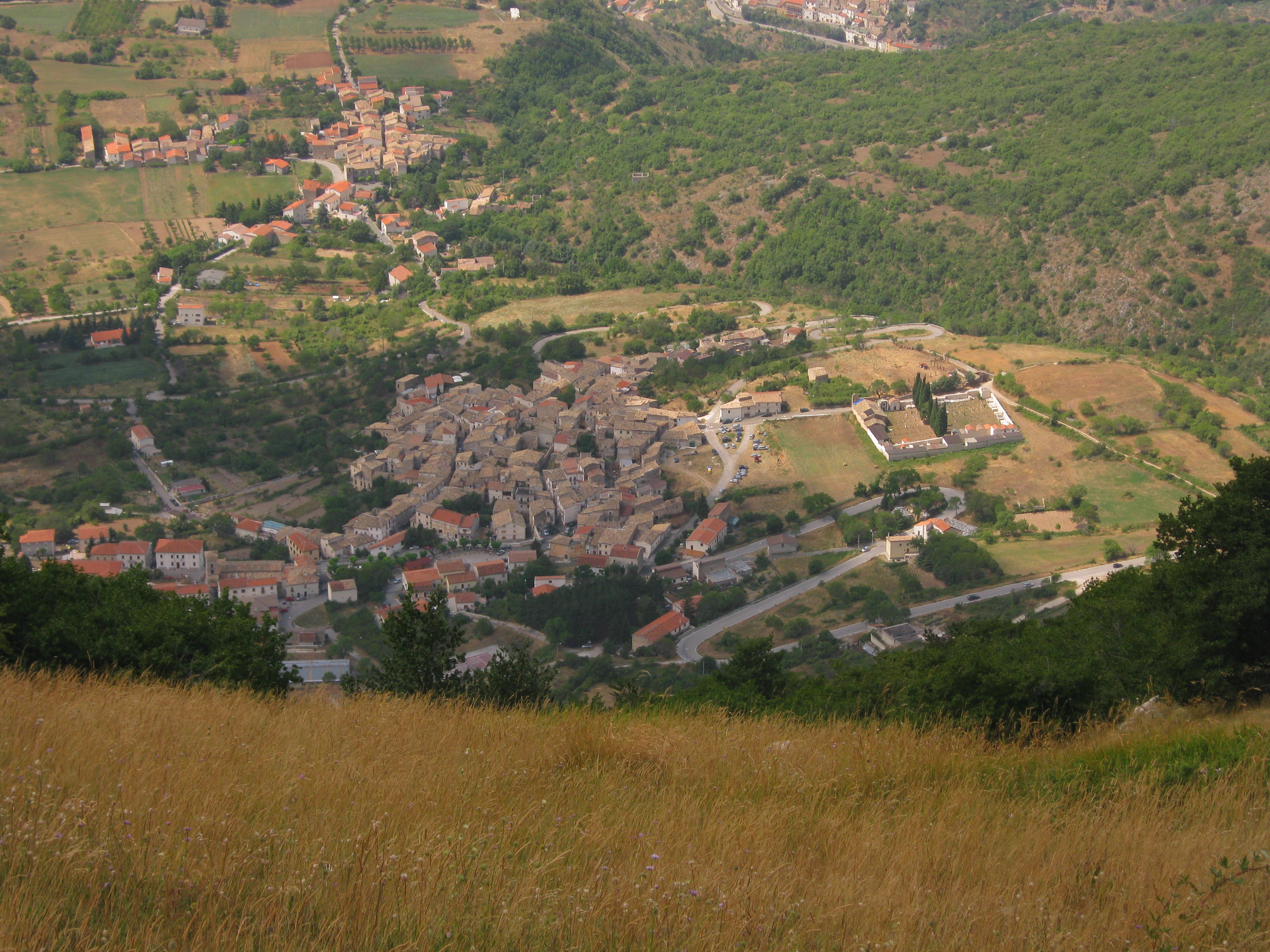
- View of Villa Santa Lucia degli Abruzzi

- Coat of arms

- Location within Italy Location within Abruzzo
- Coordinates: 42°20′3″N 13°46′40″E
- Country: Italy
- Region: Abruzzo
- Province: L'Aquila
- Frazioni: Carrufo, Randino.

Government
  - Mayor: Paride Ciotti

Area
  - Total: 26.99 km^{2} (10.42 sq mi)
- Elevation: 900 m (3,000 ft)

Population (2026)
  - Total: 76
  - Density: 2.8/km^{2} (7.3/sq mi)
- Demonym: Villesi
- Time zone: UTC+1 (CET)
  - Summer (DST): UTC+2 (CEST)
- Postal code: 67020
- Dialing code: 0862
- Patron saint: St. Lucy
- Saint day: 13 December

Villa Santa Lucia degli Abruzzi is a village and comune (municipality) in the Province of L'Aquila in the region of Abruzzo in southern Italy. It has 76 inhabitants.

It is located in the Gran Sasso and Monti della Laga National Park.

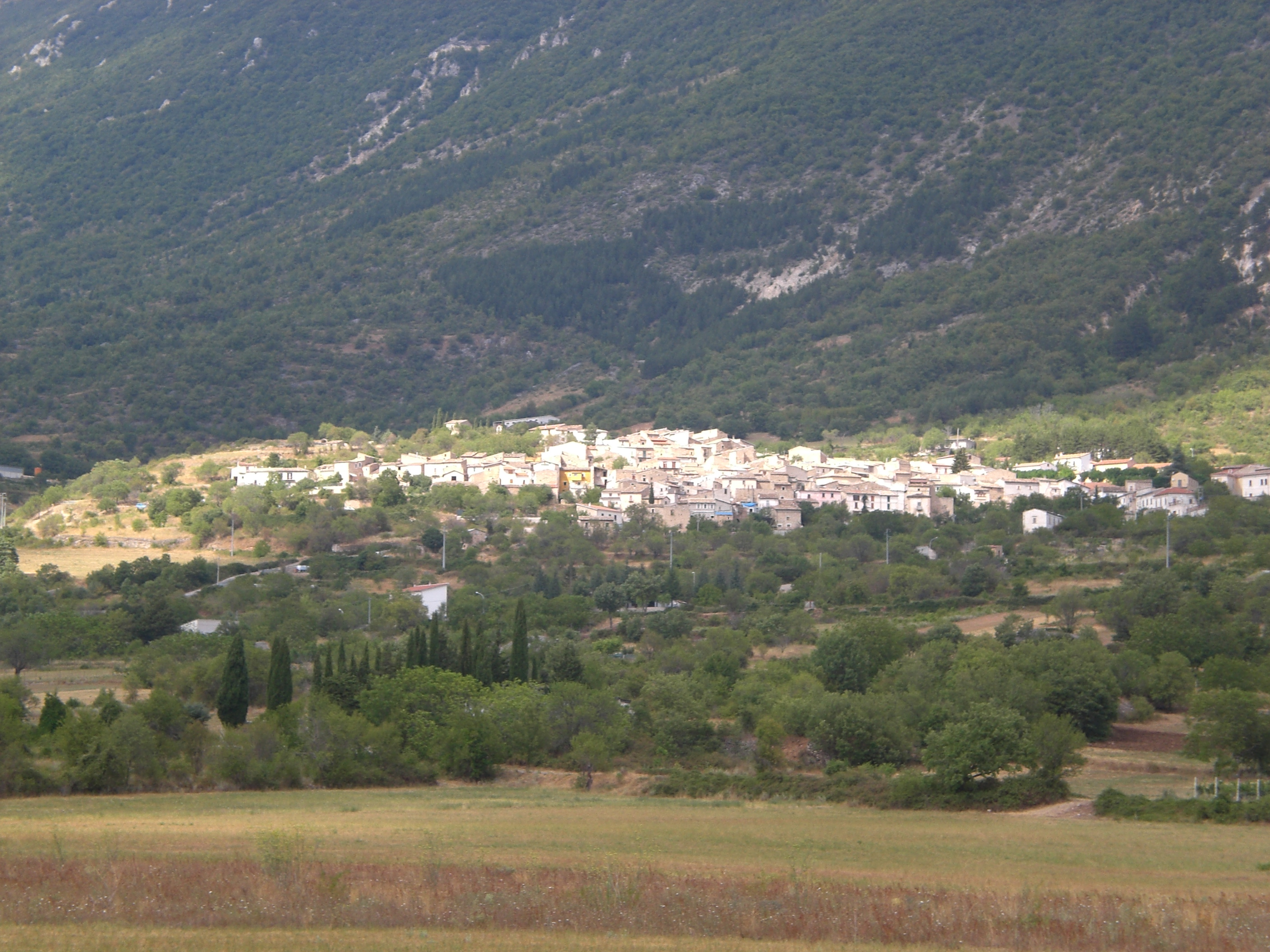
Panorama of V.S.L.dA.

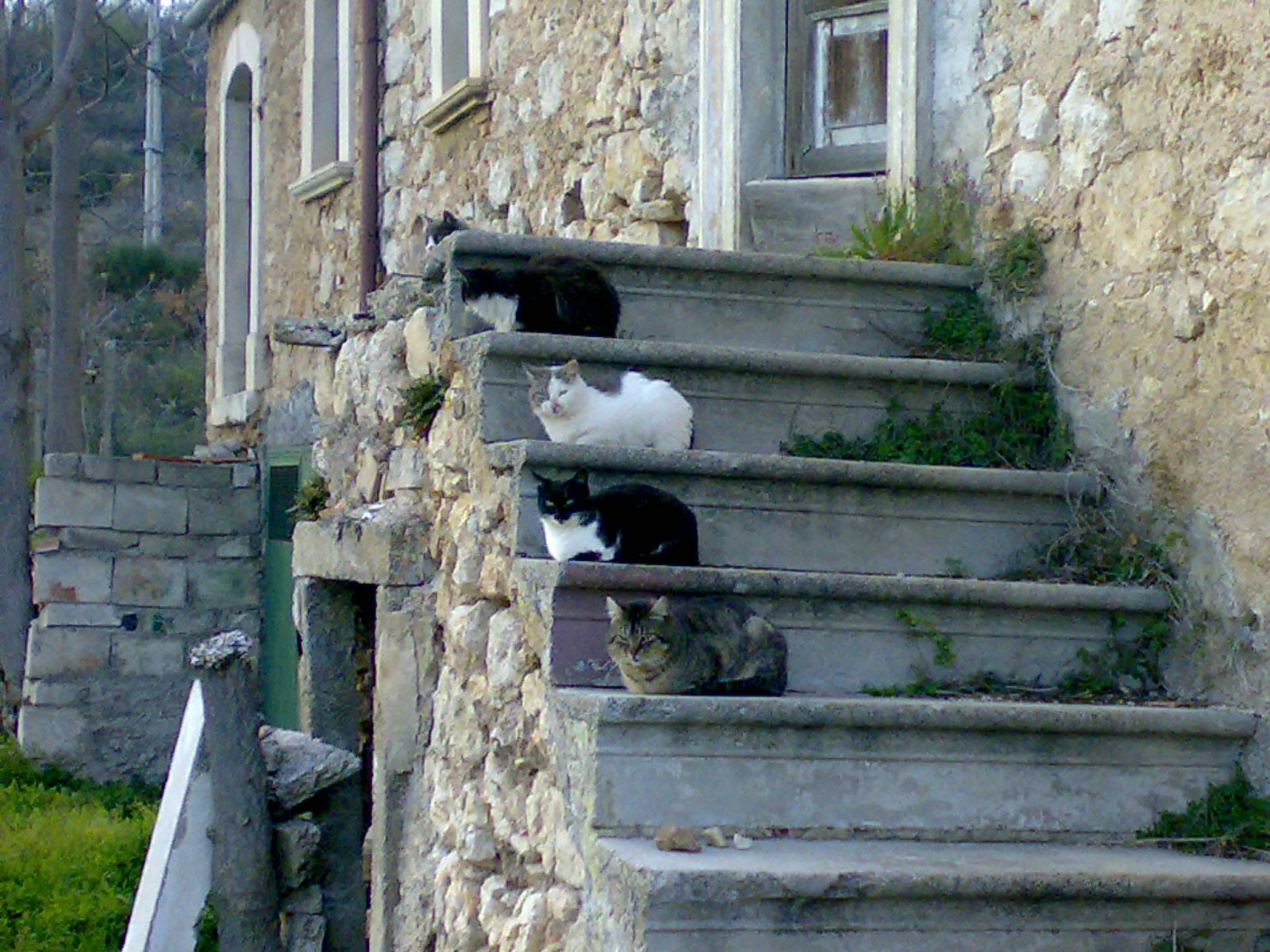
Cats of Carrufo

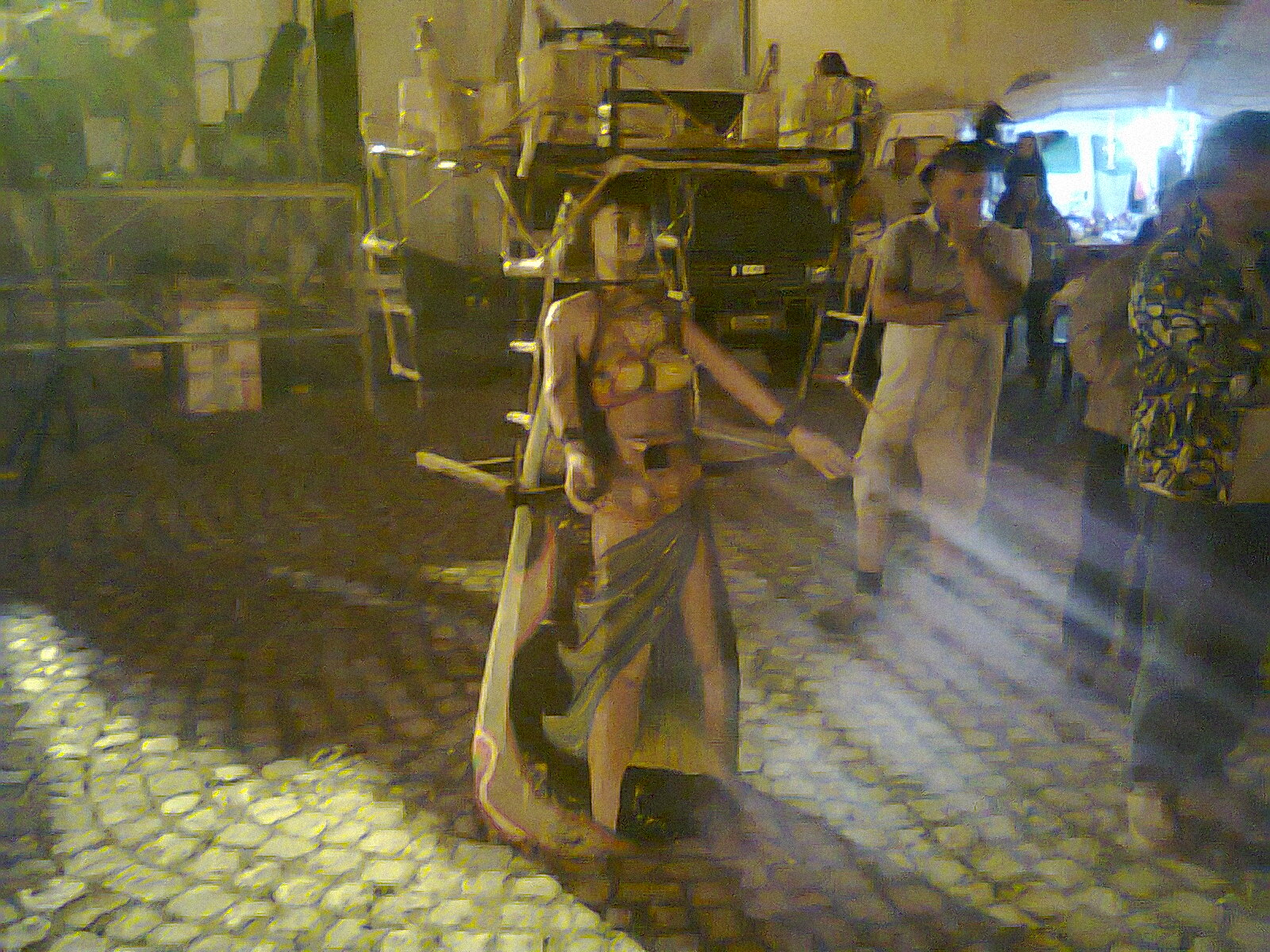
Dancing of the pupa 1

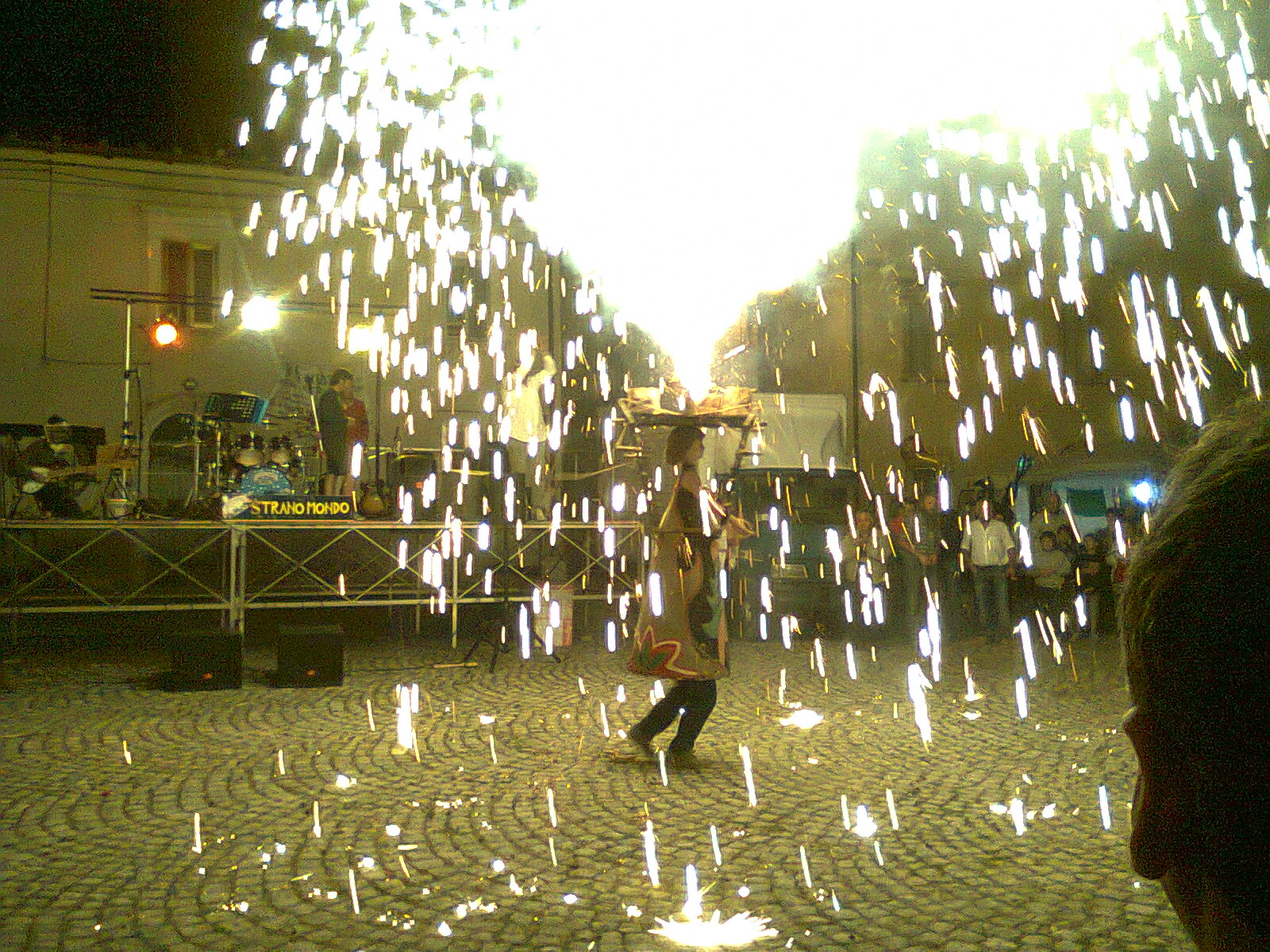
Dancing of the pupa 2

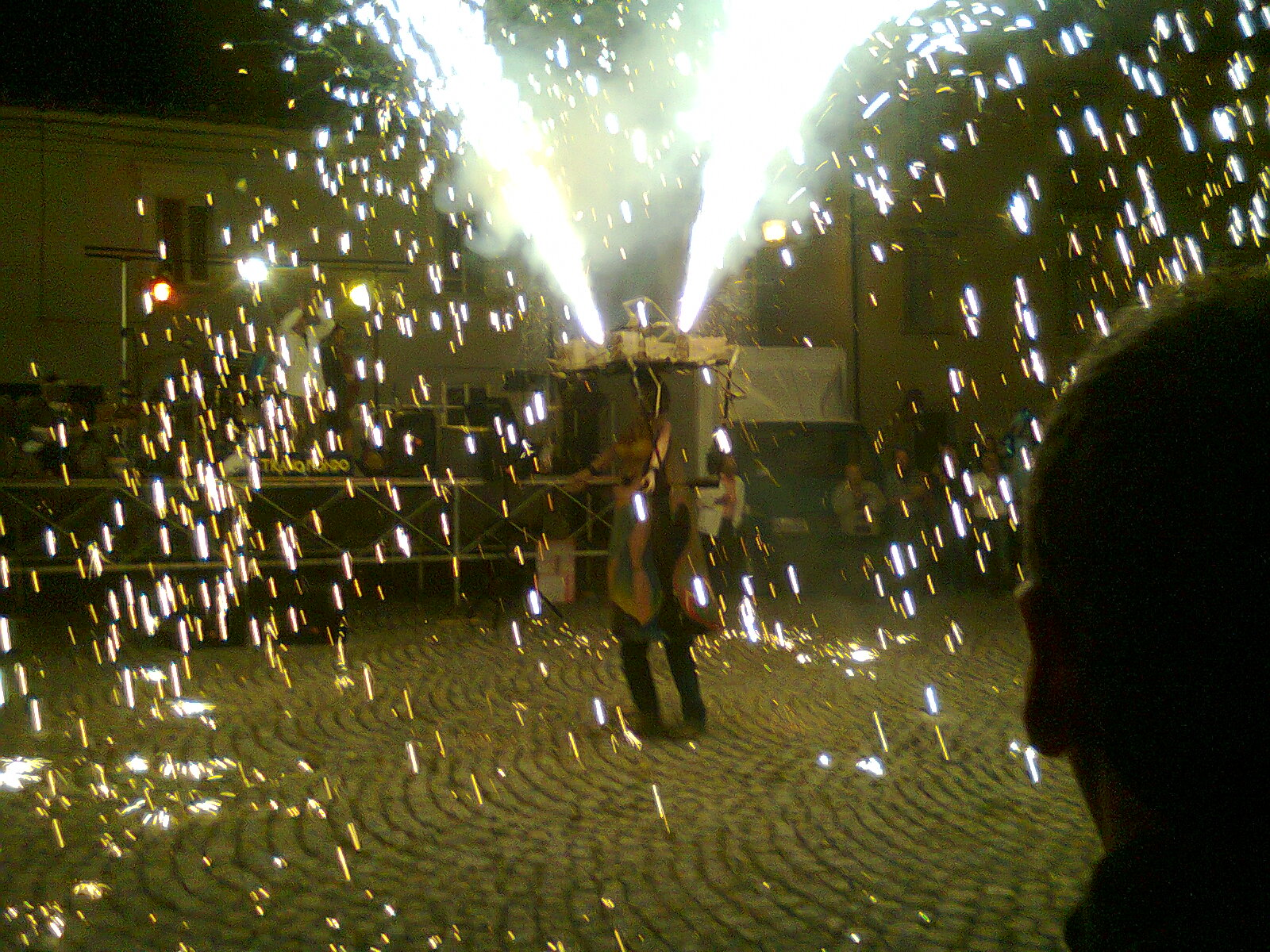
Dancing of the pupa 3

== Demographics ==
As of 2026, the population is 76, of which 50.0% are male, and 50.0% are female. Minors make up 7.9% of the population, and seniors make up 56.6% – the 2nd highest share of seniors of all municipalities in Italy.

Historical population

Year	Pop.	±%
1861	1,311	—
1871	1,452	+10.8%
1881	1,442	−0.7%
1901	2,194	+52.1%
1911	2,047	−6.7%
1921	1,709	−16.5%
1931	1,693	−0.9%
1936	1,554	−8.2%

Year	Pop.	±%
1951	1,251	−19.5%
1961	894	−28.5%
1971	574	−35.8%
1981	424	−26.1%
1991	305	−28.1%
2001	206	−32.5%
2011	141	−31.6%
2021	91	−35.5%

Source: ISTAT

=== Immigration ===
As of 2025, immigrants make up 9.6% of the population. The foreign countries of birth are France, Canada, Cuba, Poland, Romania, and Ukraine.

== Twin towns – sister cities ==
- Port Colborne, Canada
