= Carpineto della Nora =

- Comune
- Comune di Carpineto della Nora
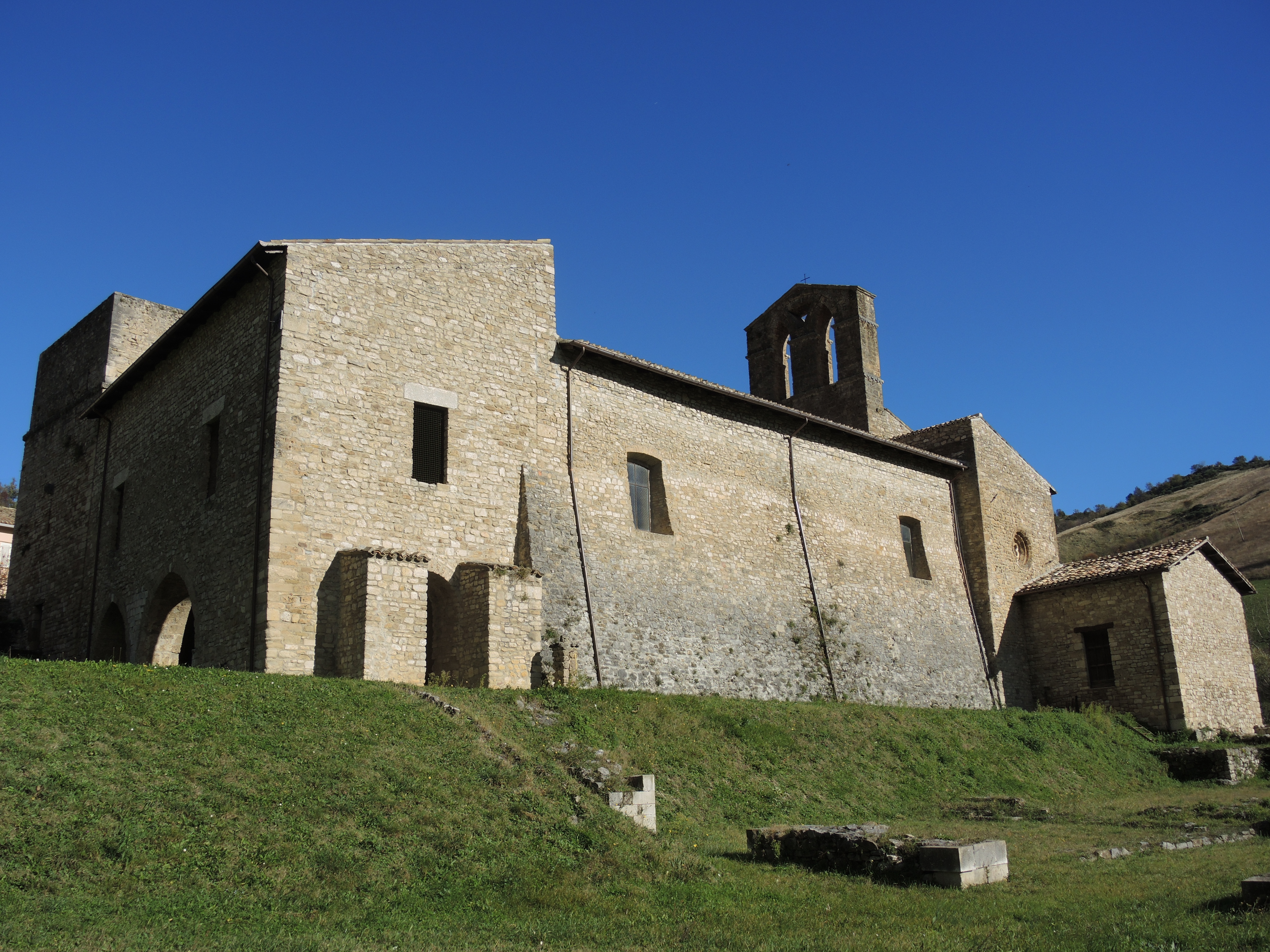
- View of Carpineto della Nora

- Coat of arms

- Location within Italy Location within Abruzzo
- Coordinates: 42°20′N 13°51′E
- Country: Italy
- Region: Abruzzo
- Province: Pescara (PE)
- Frazioni: Boschetto, La Fara, Maddalena, San Bartolomeo Superiore, Santa Lucia

Government
  - Mayor: Donatella Rosini (Progretto Comune)

Area
  - Total: 23 km^{2} (8.9 sq mi)
- Elevation: 535 m (1,755 ft)

Population (2007)
  - Total: 710
  - Density: 31/km^{2} (80/sq mi)
- Demonym: Carpinetani
- Time zone: UTC+1 (CET)
  - Summer (DST): UTC+2 (CEST)
- Postal code: 65010
- Dialing code: 085
- Website: Official website

Carpineto della Nora is a comune and town in the province of Pescara, Abruzzo region, Italy. It is located within the boundaries of the Gran Sasso e Monti della Laga National Park.

== See also ==
- Abbey of San Bartolomeo
