= Abbey of San Bartolomeo =

- Abbazia di San Bartolomeo
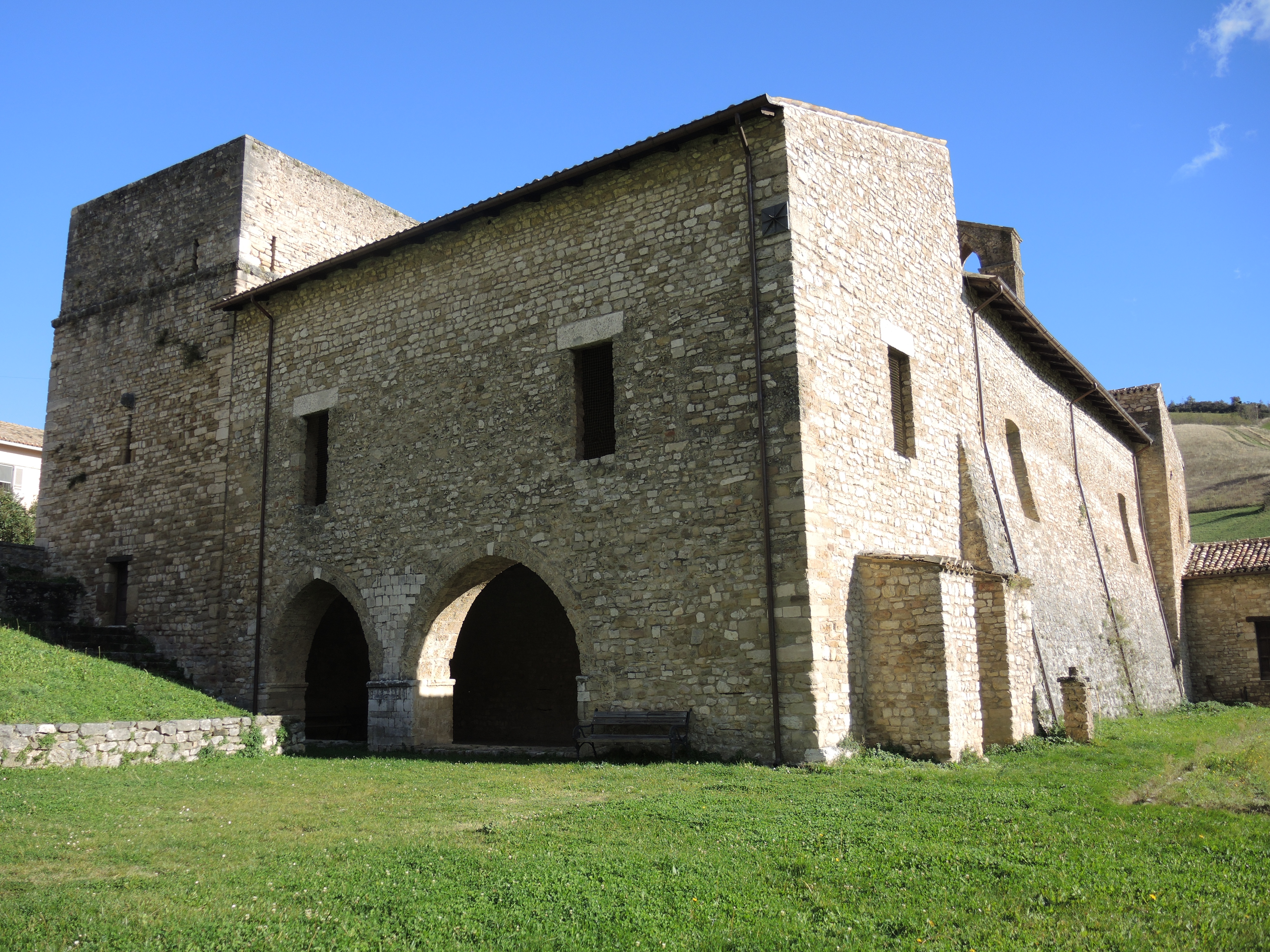
- View of the abbey

- Location within Abruzzo
- 42.338172°N 13.848846°E
- Location: Carpineto della Nora
- Country: Italy
- Denomination: Catholic

History
- Status: Abbey

Architecture
- Functional status: Active
- Style: Gothic architecture
- Completed: 10th century

Administration
- Diocese: Archdiocese of Pescara-Penne

Abbazia di San Bartolomeo (Italian for Abbey of San Bartolomeo) is a Benedictine abbey in Carpineto della Nora, Province of Pescara (Abruzzo). It was declared a national monument in 1902.

From December 2014 the Italian Ministry of Culture manages the abbey through il Polo museale dell'Abruzzo, which became Direzione regionale Musei in December 2019.

== History ==
The abbey was built in 962 by the will of Berardo or Bernardo, count of Penne, on Pietrarossa mountain, located at the eastern slope of Mount Gran Sasso.

Important information about the foundation and the properties of the Benedictine abbey can be found in the chronicle written by the monk Alessandro, which tells the story of the monastery from its origins until 1193. From this text it is possible to draw most of the historical information relating to the Monastery. For example, in 1066 the founder's grandson, who ironically was also called Berardo or Bernardo, occupied the Abbey, its service buildings, and its fields and completely destroyed the areas of the Monastery occupied by the Monks, forcing them to flee and leaving as the only religious guardian of the place his brother Sansone, who had previously made himself a monk.

In the same year (1066), the Normans led by Ugo Malmozzetto (one of the captains of Roberto di Loritello, in turn right arm of Roberto il Guiscardo) who had begun the conquest of coastal Abruzzo in 1061, dismissed Berardo from the County of Penne, taking his place, and freeing the Abbey of San Bartolomeo from its tyranny. In the Chronicon there is no mention of reconstructions. However, the oldest parts of the building such as the bell-tower's base was finished in the course of the 11th century by Abbot Erimondo, who died in 1074. Most of the church structures remaining seem to date back to the 12th and 13th centuries. After suppression of the monastery in the 19th century, much of the abbey fell to ruin. in addition to the restoration carried out in the 1970s by the Superintendency;

The first abbot was Benedetto, chosen by Count Berardo, and under his regency the arm of San Bartolomeo reached the monastery, an event so exceptional that it attracted the bishops of Teate, Valva, Penne, Marsica and Apruzio to the abbey.

== Architecture ==
The complex has undergone reconstruction mainly in the last century. The elements remaining including a rectangular apse with a rose window and mullioned windows are typical of gothic architecture.
