= Corvara, Abruzzo =

Corvara
- Comune
- Comune di Corvara
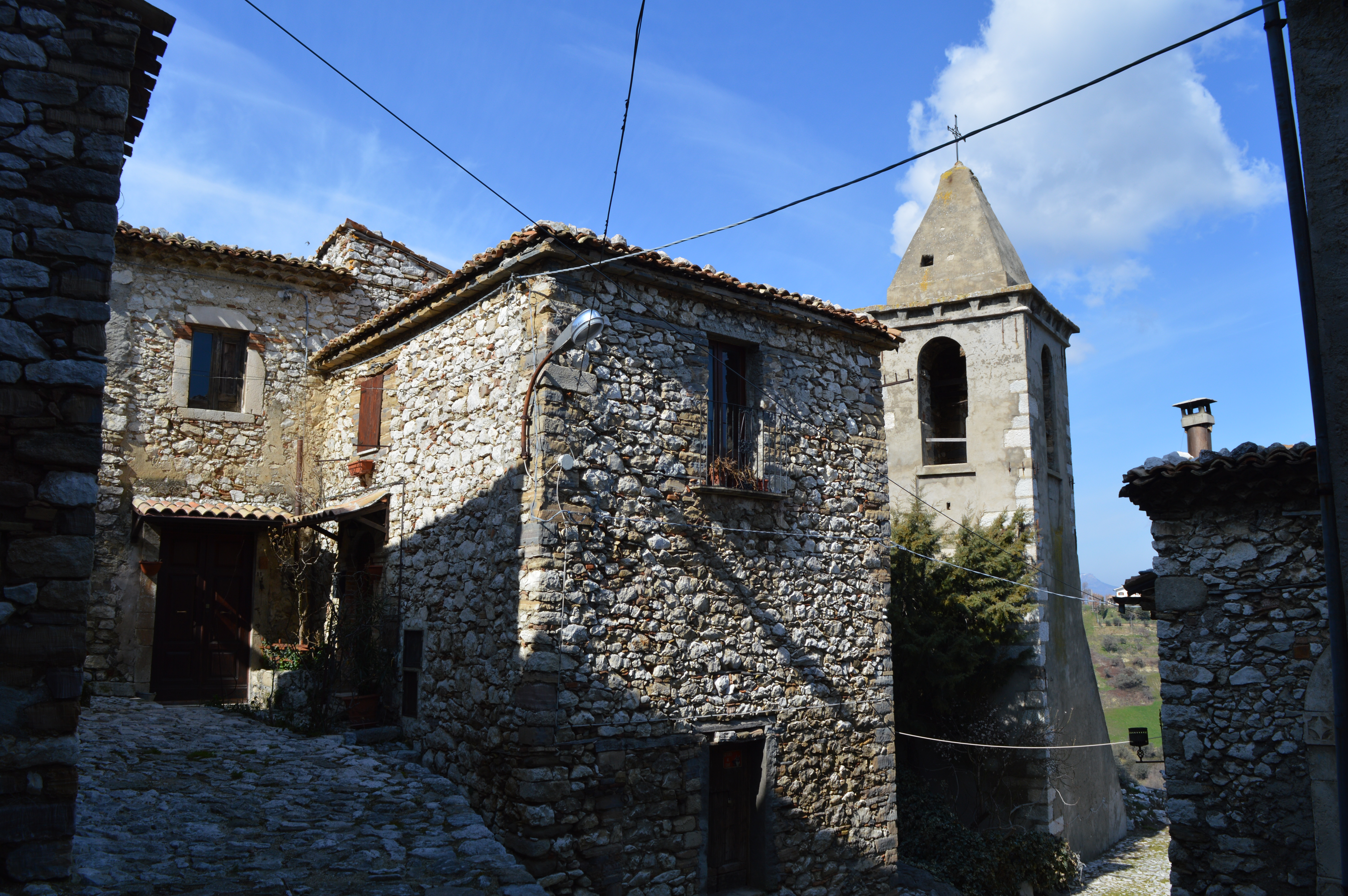
- View of Corvara

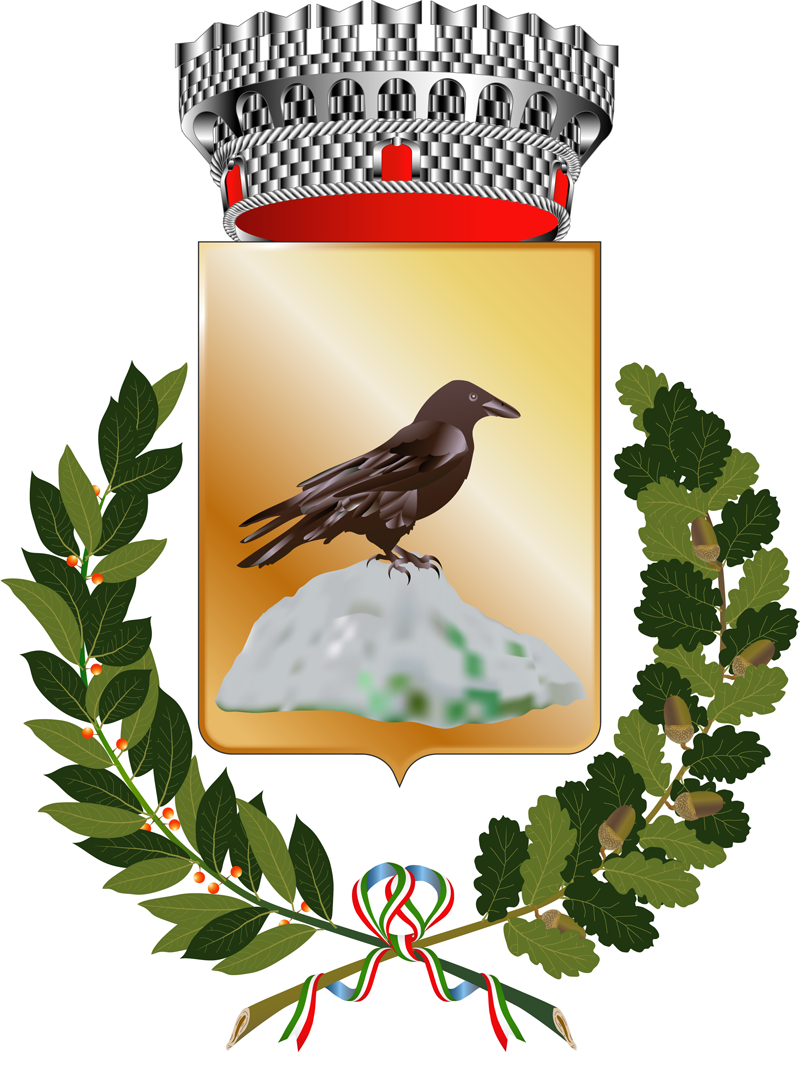
- Coat of arms

- Location within Italy Location within Abruzzo
- Coordinates: 42°16′30.6156″N 13°52′24.726″E
- Country: Italy
- Region: Abruzzo
- Province: Pescara (PE)
- Frazioni: Brittoli, Bussi sul Tirino, Capestrano (AQ), Pescosansonesco, Pietranico

Government
  - Mayor: Guido di Persio Marganella (Uniti per Fare)

Area
  - Total: 13 km^{2} (5.0 sq mi)
- Elevation: 625 m (2,051 ft)

Population (2007)
  - Total: 294
  - Density: 23/km^{2} (59/sq mi)
- Time zone: UTC+1 (CET)
  - Summer (DST): UTC+2 (CEST)
- Postal code: 65020
- Dialing code: 085

Corvara (Italian pronunciation: [korˈvaːra]) is a comune and town in the Province of Pescara in the Abruzzo region of Italy. It is located in Gran Sasso e Monti della Laga National Park.
