= Lake Pietranzoni =

Glacial lake in Abruzzo, Italy

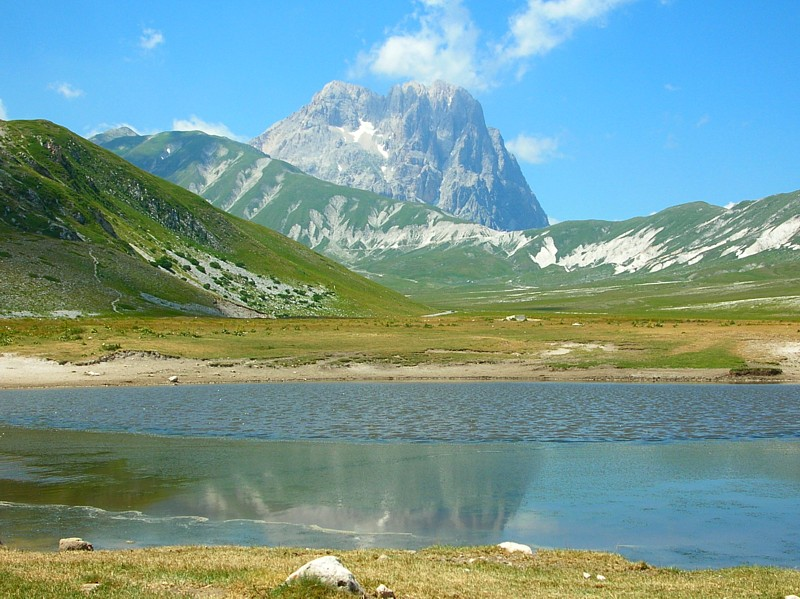
- Lake Pietranzoni with Corno Grande in the background.

- Location of Lake Pietranzoni Lake Pietranzoni (Abruzzo)
- Location: L'Aquila, Province of L'Aquila, Abruzzo, Italy
- Coordinates: 42.427853°N 13.624516°E
- Type: Glacial lake
- Primary inflows: None
- Primary outflows: None
- Surface elevation: 1,660 m (5,450 ft)

The Lake Pietranzoni is a high-altitude mountain lake located in Abruzzo, in the Province of L'Aquila, at an elevation of 1,660 m above sea level.

Due to its position in the middle Campo Imperatore plateau, being entirely surrounded by the main peaks of the Gran Sasso d'Italia massif, it holds landscape importance and is also known as the "mirror of Gran Sasso" or "mirror of Abruzzo". It is included within the territory of the Gran Sasso and Monti della Laga National Park.

== Description ==
Lake Pietranzoni is a small body of water of glacial origin located in the municipal territory of L'Aquila on the middle Campo Imperatore plateau, in a place characterized by morainic deposits and known as the Pietranzoni plain.

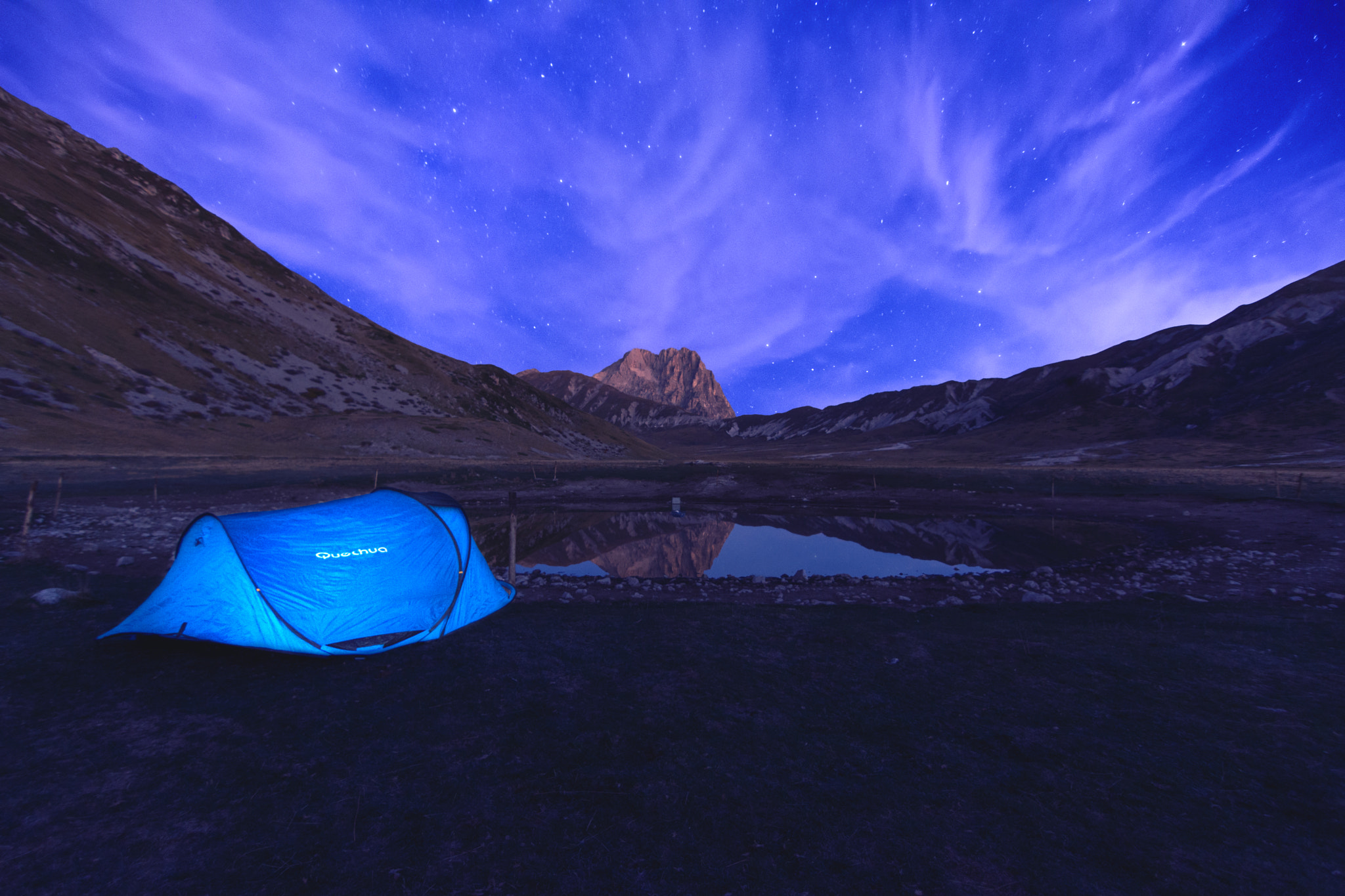
View from the lake at sunset.

It is entirely surrounded by the Gran Sasso d'Italia massif: to the northwest by the central ridge with the main peaks between Pizzo Cefalone, the crest of Monte Portella, Monte Aquila (Gran Sasso), and Corno Grande; to the northeast by the eastern ridge with Monte Brancastello, Monte Prena, and Monte Camicia; and to the south by the southern spurs of the massif.

The lake's dimensions are variable, depending significantly on precipitation and the melting of snow. The diameter of the water body is approximately 60 meters, and its perimeter is about 200 meters, while the depth of the basin is negligible. The lake has no visible outflows, but there are swallow holes on the bottom that are connected, via underground karst channels, to the springs of the Tirino river and other local streams.

=== Accessibility ===
Lake Pietranzoni is located adjacent to the road that reaches the Campo Imperatore hotel, branching off from the Strada Statale 17 bis. It is approximately 18 kilometres (11 mi) from Santo Stefano di Sessanio, 22 kilometres (14 mi) from Assergi and the A24 motorway, and 36 kilometres (22 mi) from L'Aquila.

== See also ==
- Campo Imperatore
