= Castel del Monte, Abruzzo =

Hill town in Abruzzo, Italy

Castel del Monte
- Comune
- Comune di Castel del Monte
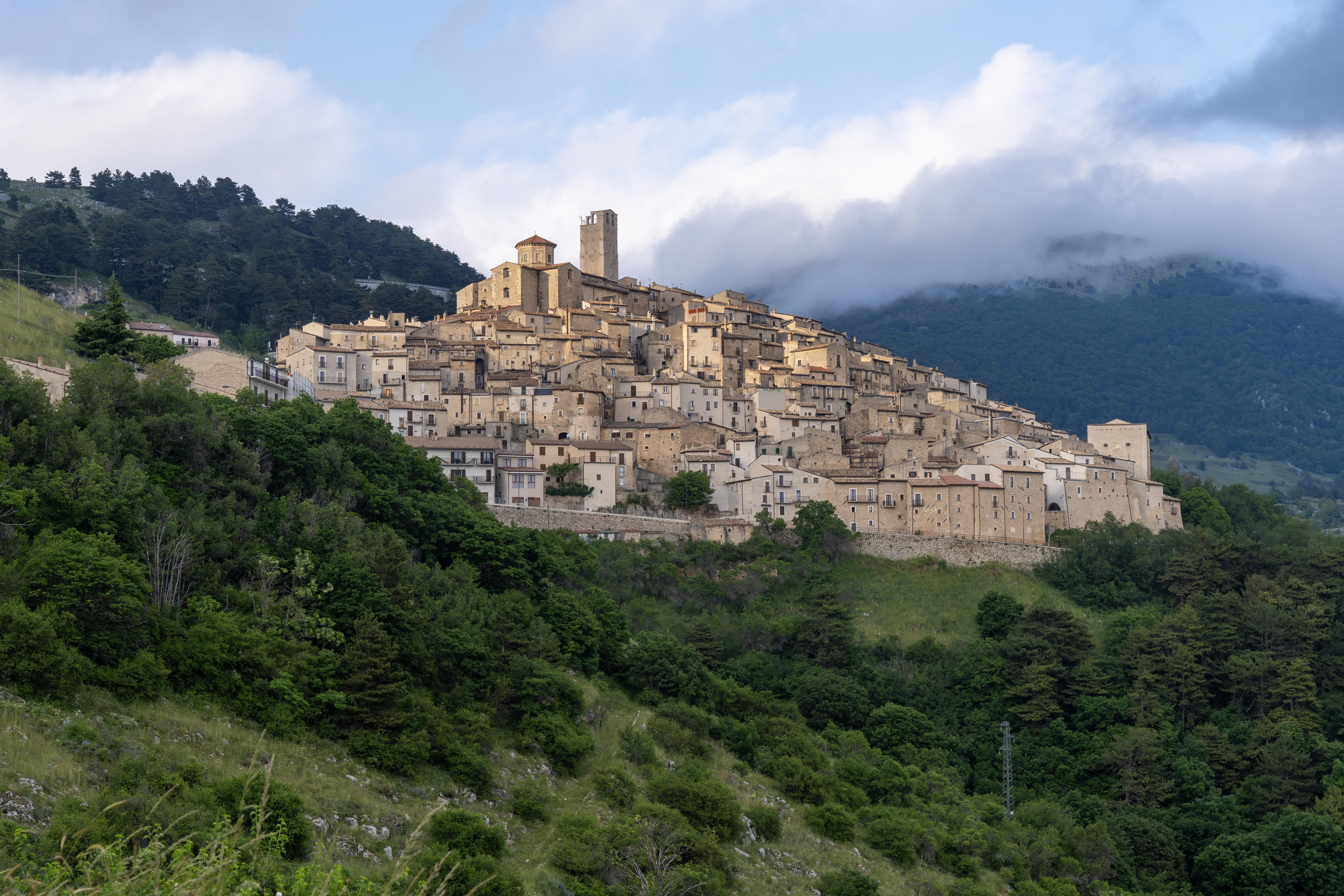

- Coat of arms

- Location within Italy Location within Abruzzo
- Coordinates: 42°22′0″N 13°43′44″E
- Country: Italy
- Region: Abruzzo
- Province: L'Aquila (AQ)

Government
  - Mayor: Luciano Mucciante

Area
  - Total: 57.83 km^{2} (22.33 sq mi)
- Elevation: 1,346 m (4,416 ft)

Population (31 December 2021)
  - Total: 456
  - Density: 7.89/km^{2} (20.4/sq mi)
- Demonym: Castellani
- Time zone: UTC+1 (CET)
  - Summer (DST): UTC+2 (CEST)
- Postal code: 67023
- Dialing code: 0862
- Patron saint: Saint Donatus
- Saint day: 7 August

Castel del Monte is a medieval and Renaissance hill town and comune in the province of L'Aquila in northern Abruzzo, Italy. Located in the heart of the Gran Sasso mountain range, the town is set into a steep hillside nestled beneath mountain peaks near the high plain of Campo Imperatore. Castel del Monte sits opposite the ancient mountaintop fortress of Rocca Calascio and faces Monte Sirente in the distance. It is located in the Gran Sasso e Monti della Laga National Park. It is one of I Borghi più belli d'Italia ("The most beautiful villages of Italy").

== History ==
The name Castel del Monte is from the Latin Castellum Montis, meaning "fortress of the mountain". The first evidence of human settlement are artifacts from the 11th century BC discovered in the valley beneath Castel del Monte and believed to be from an ancient necropolis. In the 4th century BC, Romans conquered the area and established Città delle Tre Corone, the name meaning "town of the three crowns". This town was later abandoned after the fall of the Western Roman Empire, and replaced by the fortified town of Ricetto in what is now the oldest part of Castel del Monte.

Porta San Rocco, the main gate to historic Castel del Monte. Until the end of the 19th Century, the town's five gates were shut each night to keep out bandits

The first recorded mention of Castellum Del Monte came in 1223 in a papal bull by Pope Honorius III. In 1298, the Counts of Aquaviva took possession of the town. In 1474, it passed to Alessandro Sforza and a short time later to the Piccolominis. In 1501, forces loyal to Spain plundered Castel del Monte because of the town's allegiance to France.

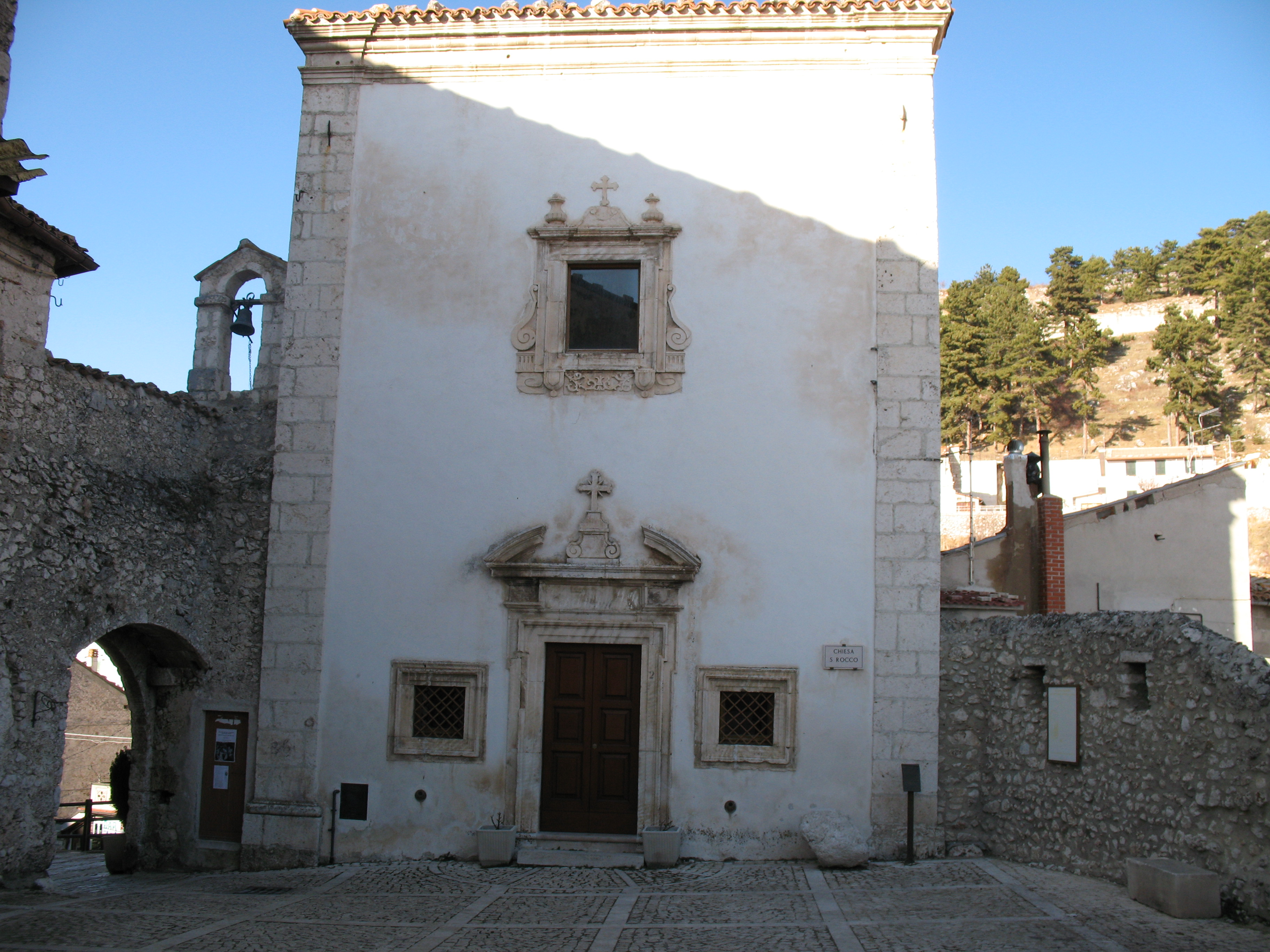
Chiesa di San Rocco, built adjacent to the town's main portal after the plague of 1656

In 1579, the Piccolominis ceded the village as part of the Baronage of Carapelle to Francesco de' Medici, Grand Duke of Tuscany. The Medici, who governed the baronage for over a century-and-a-half, left their imprint on Castel del Monte. Among the Medici legacies to the town is the construction of Chiesa "Matrice" di San Marco in 1657, whose tower is one of the dominant architectural features of Castel del Monte; the painting of St. John the Baptist in the church of Madonna del Suffragio by Bernardino di Lorenzo di Monaldo (circa 1585) commissioned by Francesco de' Medici himself; and the diminutive Chiesa di San Rocco (1656).

The town's massive defensive walls, largely formed by "wall houses", and its great gates, were also completed under this period of Medici rule.

In 1743, the baronage passed to Charles of Bourbon, then king of Naples and Sicily (later King Charles III of Spain). The village became part of Italy in 1861.

== Population and economy ==
According to the Istituto Nazionale di Statistica (the Italian Statistical Institute), Castel del Monte's resident population on December 31, 2021 was just 456 well below the town's population in earlier centuries.

Castel del Monte behind sign designating the town one of Italy's most beautiful villages, I borghi piu belli d’Italia

A local resident playing the role of a witch in La Notte delle Streghe, the "Castellano" folk drama which attracts thousands of tourists

Until recent times, Castel del Monte's economic wellbeing has been tied to sheep farming. Between the 12th century and 16th century, the area was one of the most prolific wool producers in Europe. This prosperity continued until the end of the Transhumance, an annual sheep drive south to Apulia, which ceased in the 1850s. Though Castel del Monte continued to produce wool, pecorino cheese and lamb, the economy never recovered to its pre-1850s level and the town's population steadily declined. This population decline accelerated in the second half of the 20th century when significant numbers of Castel del Monte's residents migrated to Wallonia, many to work in its coal mines. Others migrated to France, Switzerland, the United Kingdom, and the United States. In recent years, former residents who emigrated to French-speaking countries and their children have been returning to Castel del Monte with more frequency for vacations and, in some cases, to retire.

Tourism is central to Castel del Monte's economic hopes. The absence of economic development in the 20th century meant there was little new construction in Castel del Monte within the past 100 years. As a result, most structures in Castel del Monte are several centuries old, and many are little changed from the Middle Ages or Renaissance. The creation of Parco Nazionale del Gran Sasso e Monti della Laga in 1993, which Castel del Monte lies entirely within, assures that the land surrounding the town will remain forever wild, thus preserving Castel del Monte in a near pristine state.

Castel del Monte's biggest tourist event is La Notte delle Streghe or The Night of the Witches, an annual event for which the town is well known. Held in mid-August, thousands visit the town for the late-night spectacle where the entire historic district serves as a stage for residents who play the roles of townspeople and witches in a folk drama in the local dialect known as "Castellano".

In 2006, Castel del Monte was named one of the "borghi più belli d'Italia", the most beautiful villages of Italy. In return for this honor, the town agreed to promote historic preservation and environmental protection. The town has also been recognized by the Slow Food movement for its sustainable agriculture, in particular its canestrato cheese.

== Popular culture ==
Castel del Monte is the principal location of The American, a suspense film, released September 1, 2010, directed by Anton Corbijn. The film's central character "Jack", played by George Clooney, holes up in Castel Del Monte hoping to escape from his past.

== Twin towns ==
- Somain, France

== Climate ==
Climate data for Castel del Monte, elevation 1,300 m (4,300 ft), (1951–2000)
Month	Jan	Feb	Mar	Apr	May	Jun	Jul	Aug	Sep	Oct	Nov	Dec	Year
Record high °C (°F)	16.0 (60.8)	16.0 (60.8)	20.5 (68.9)	22.5 (72.5)	27.9 (82.2)	34.1 (93.4)	35.0 (95.0)	33.0 (91.4)	32.0 (89.6)	25.5 (77.9)	21.6 (70.9)	18.1 (64.6)	35.0 (95.0)
Mean daily maximum °C (°F)	4.3 (39.7)	4.7 (40.5)	7.4 (45.3)	10.8 (51.4)	15.6 (60.1)	19.6 (67.3)	22.9 (73.2)	23.0 (73.4)	19.2 (66.6)	13.8 (56.8)	8.8 (47.8)	5.2 (41.4)	12.9 (55.3)
Daily mean °C (°F)	1.0 (33.8)	1.1 (34.0)	3.6 (38.5)	6.8 (44.2)	11.2 (52.2)	14.9 (58.8)	17.7 (63.9)	17.8 (64.0)	14.5 (58.1)	9.9 (49.8)	5.4 (41.7)	2.1 (35.8)	8.8 (47.9)
Mean daily minimum °C (°F)	−2.3 (27.9)	−2.4 (27.7)	−0.3 (31.5)	2.7 (36.9)	6.9 (44.4)	10.1 (50.2)	12.6 (54.7)	12.5 (54.5)	9.8 (49.6)	6.0 (42.8)	1.9 (35.4)	−1.0 (30.2)	4.7 (40.5)
Record low °C (°F)	−18.2 (−0.8)	−14.6 (5.7)	−16.0 (3.2)	−8.2 (17.2)	−5.9 (21.4)	0.0 (32.0)	2.5 (36.5)	2.0 (35.6)	−2.3 (27.9)	−6.1 (21.0)	−14.0 (6.8)	−15.3 (4.5)	−18.2 (−0.8)
Average precipitation mm (inches)	78.3 (3.08)	65.0 (2.56)	72.5 (2.85)	81.9 (3.22)	67.2 (2.65)	61.7 (2.43)	46.8 (1.84)	47.3 (1.86)	64.9 (2.56)	84.6 (3.33)	108.5 (4.27)	92.3 (3.63)	871 (34.28)
Average precipitation days	8.7	9.1	9.2	10.2	9.4	7.9	5.8	5.7	7.0	8.8	10.6	10.6	103
Source: Regione Abruzzo
