= Santo Stefano di Sessanio =

- Comune
- Comune di Santo Stefano di Sessanio
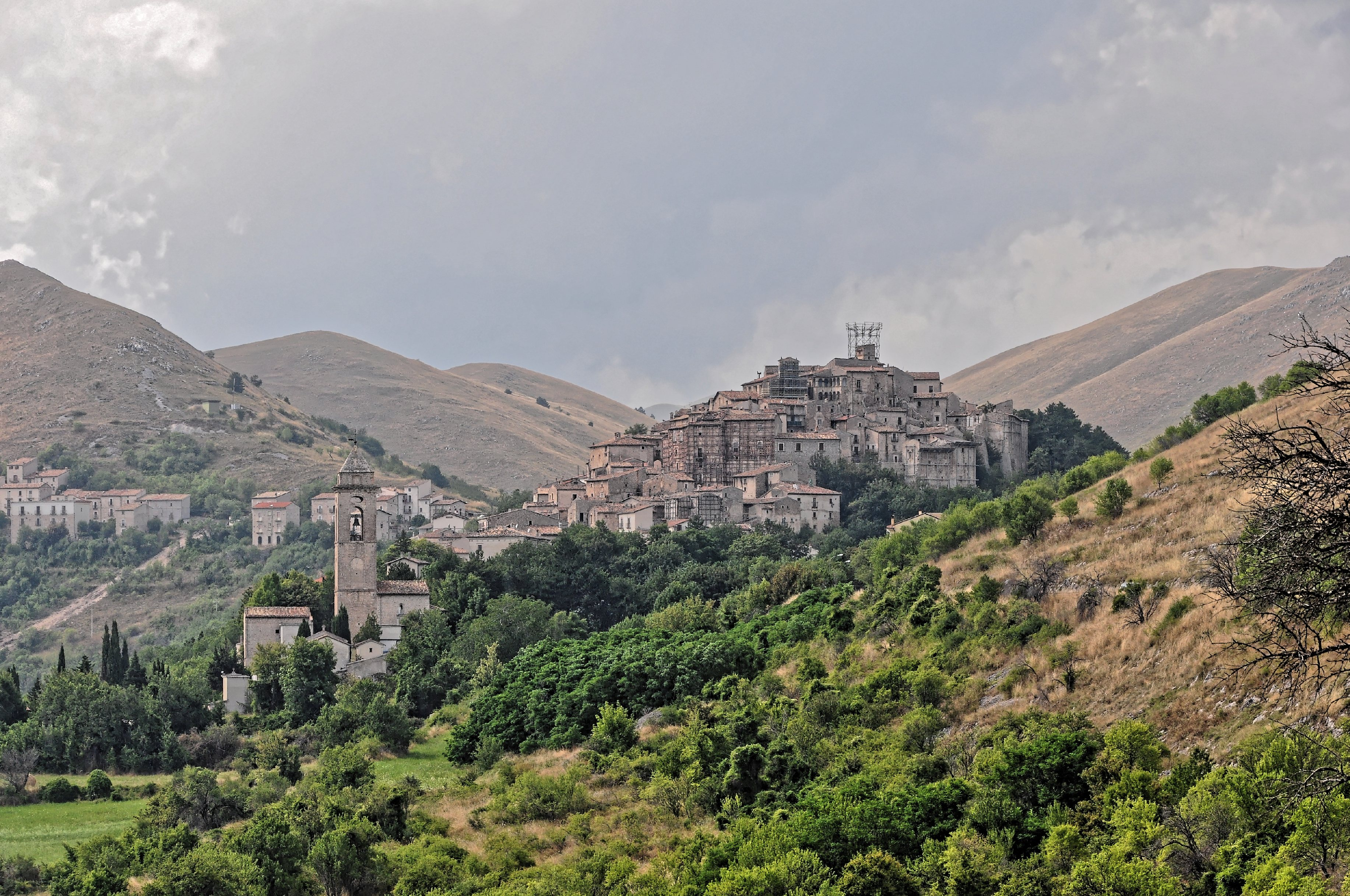
- View of Santo Stefano di Sessanio

- Location within Italy Location within Abruzzo
- Coordinates: 42°20′45″N 13°38′42″E
- Country: Italy
- Region: Abruzzo
- Province: L'Aquila (AQ)
- Frazioni: Barisciano, Calascio, Carapelle Calvisio, Castelvecchio Calvisio, Isola del Gran Sasso d'Italia (TE), L'Aquila

Government
  - Mayor: Fabio Santavicca

Area
  - Total: 33.14 km^{2} (12.80 sq mi)
- Elevation: 1,250 m (4,100 ft)

Population (30 November 2014)
  - Total: 117
  - Density: 3.53/km^{2} (9.14/sq mi)
- Demonym: Stefanari
- Time zone: UTC+1 (CET)
  - Summer (DST): UTC+2 (CEST)
- Postal code: 67020
- Dialing code: 0862
- ISTAT code: 066091
- Saint day: 3 August

Santo Stefano di Sessanio is a comune and hill town in the province of L'Aquila in the Abruzzo region of southern Italy. Located in the Gran Sasso e Monti della Laga National Park, in the highest region of the Apennines, this medieval hill town sits adjacent to the high plain of Campo Imperatore. It is one of I Borghi più belli d'Italia ("The most beautiful villages of Italy").

== Population and economy ==
The tiny medieval village of Santo Stefano lay largely abandoned with many of its ancient buildings in ruins and only 70 inhabitants until recent years. Now, many of the village's buildings have been restored. Some comprise the Sextantio Albergo Diffuso, or extended hotel. Other structures have been restored as vacation homes. The village's population as of 15 October 2020 was 115. However, with its distance to Rome of 154 kilometres (96 mi) by car, or less than two hours' drive, the small village has become a fashionable weekend and summer retreat. Among its most notable part-time residents was Lucio Dalla, the Italian singer and songwriter. The village's main source of income is tourism with small boutiques, art galleries and eateries tucked into ancient stone structures. In the 21st century the ancient village had a rebirth thanks to tourism. In fact, in 1994 a young entrepreneur arrived in the village, Daniele Kihlgren, from Milan with Swedish origin, who bought a large part of the village to build a widespread hotel and, thanks to the project of conservative recovery of the landscape, traditions and buildings, he attracted the interest of the national and international press. This attracted new investors, significantly increasing all economic activities in the area.

Along with its neighbor Castel del Monte, Santo Stefano has been named one of Italy's prettiest villages, "I Borghi Piu belli D’Italia", and recognized by the Slow Food movement for its sustainable agriculture, in particular its gourmet lentils, "lenticchie". The town holds a festival on the first weekend in September of each year, the "Sagra delle Lenticchie", celebrating this food.

== History ==
“Sessanio" or "Sextantia", as it was called in Roman times, is the patron saint of the village. Many structures in the village date from the 11th through 15th centuries. In the 12th century, Santo Stefano was part of the Baronage of Carapelle, which included Castel del Monte, Calascio, Capestrano, Carapelle, Castelvecchio, Ofena, and Villa S. Lucia. The still standing village portal and now destroyed circular tower (the town's most notable architectural landmark) were constructed by the Medicis. The entrance portal, which leads to the village's main square, is emblazoned with the Medici coat of arms. Other historic structures include the Church of Santa Maria in Ruvo, Casa Fortezza, the Church of Santo Stefano, the ruins of the Palazzo Anelli, the Church of Santa Maria delle Grazie, and the Convent S. Maria del Monte.

=== 2009 earthquake ===
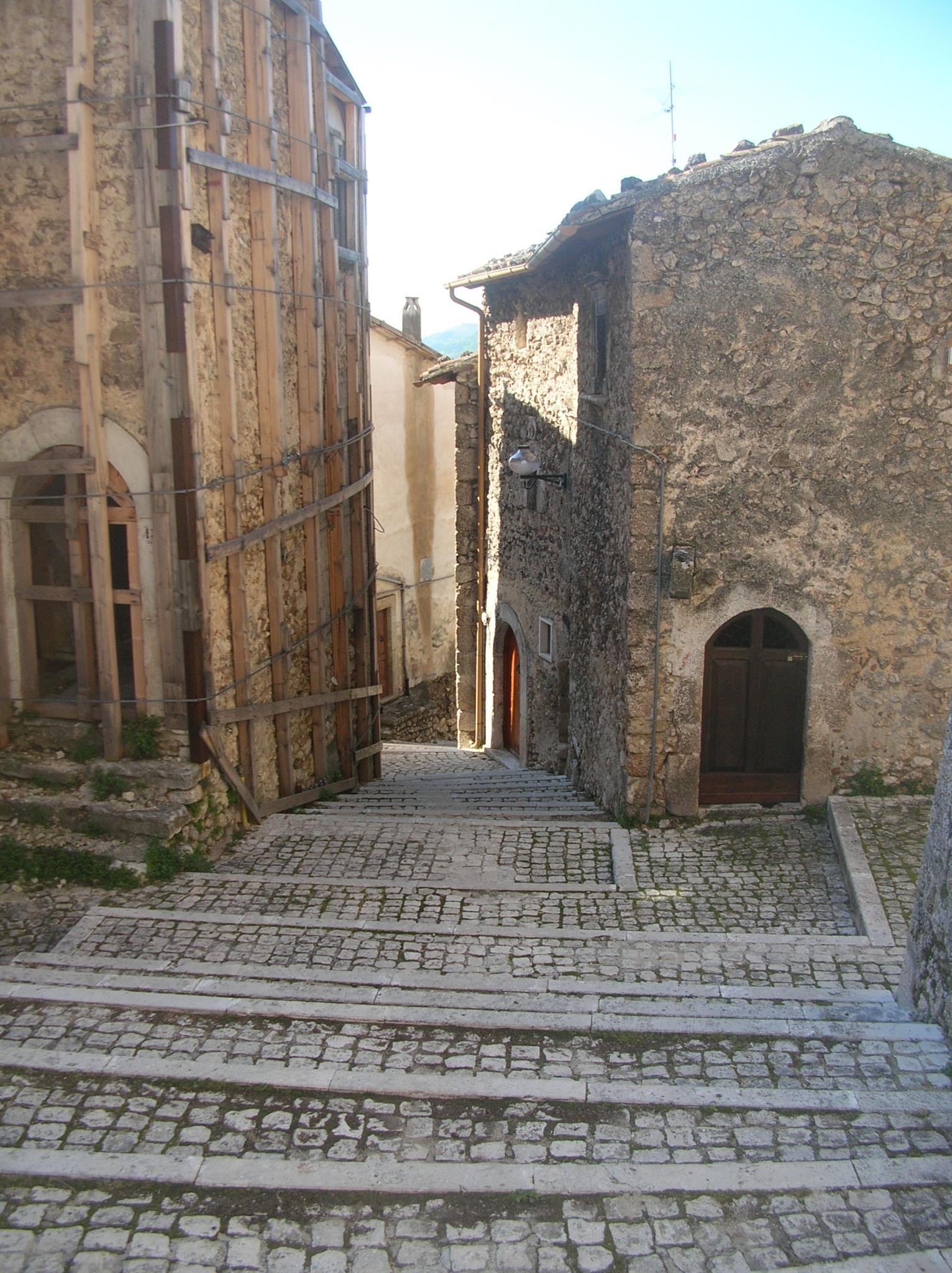
Santo Stefano di Sessanio's Medici Tower – before its collapse in the 6 April 2009 l'Aquila earthquake, the tower now lies in ruins

In the 2009 L'Aquila earthquake, Santo Stefano lost its two most precious architectural prizes: its Medici Tower, the town's iconic symbol, which totally collapsed, and its 17th-century Church of the Madonna del Lago, which lost most of its front facade and suffered a major roof collapse. The hill town's other ancient masonry buildings largely survived although many suffered structural damage. The Medici Tower is believed to have been rendered vulnerable to collapse because of 20th-century renovations to the tower's observation platform, which replaced a wooden deck with one made of reinforced concrete, thus making the tower top-heavy.

== Main sights ==
- Medieval tower
- Medici Palace
- Church of Santo Stefano
- Castle of Rocca Calascio
- Park of Campo Imperatore
