= Hotel Campo Imperatore =

Ski hotel in Abruzzo, Italy

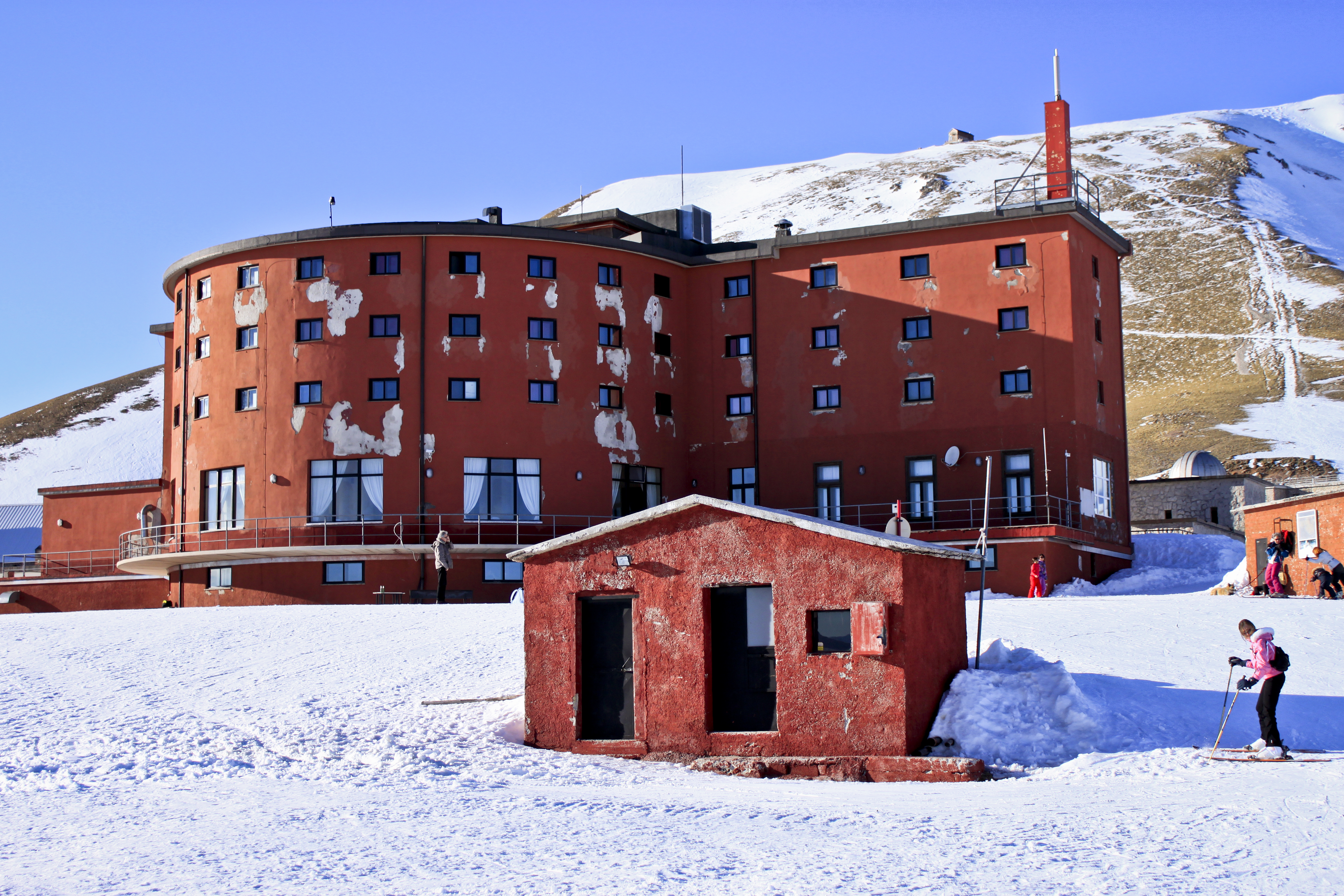
- The hotel in winter.

- Location within Italy Location within Abruzzo
- Former names: Albergo Amedeo di Savoia Duca d’Aosta
- Alternative names: Albergo di Campo Imperatore

General information
- Status: Under renovation
- Type: Hotel
- Architectural style: Rationalism
- Location: Italy
- Coordinates: 42.44255°N 13.55898°E

Design and construction
- Known for: Housing Benito Mussolini during his imprisonment

Website
- ilgransasso.it

The Hotel Campo Imperatore, also known as Albergo di Campo Imperatore, is a hotel on top of Campo Imperatore at 2,130 metres (6,990 ft) altitude on the slopes of Monte Portella, in the massif of Gran Sasso d'Italia, within the municipality of L'Aquila.

It was designed in the 1930s by Italian engineer Vittorio Bonadè Bottino.

The structure is famous for having been where Benito Mussolini was held prisoner between August 28 and September 12, 1943, following the armistice of Cassibile, until his liberation by the German paratroopers as part the Gran Sasso raid. Today, it serves as the main lodging for the ski resort of the same name, and a starting point for hiking on the western side of the Gran Sasso.

The main structure has been closed for renovations since at least 2018. Its hostel lodges visitors in the meantime.
