= Gran Sasso and Monti della Laga National Park =

National park in Italy

Parco Nazionale del Gran Sasso e Monti della Laga
- IUCN category II (national park)

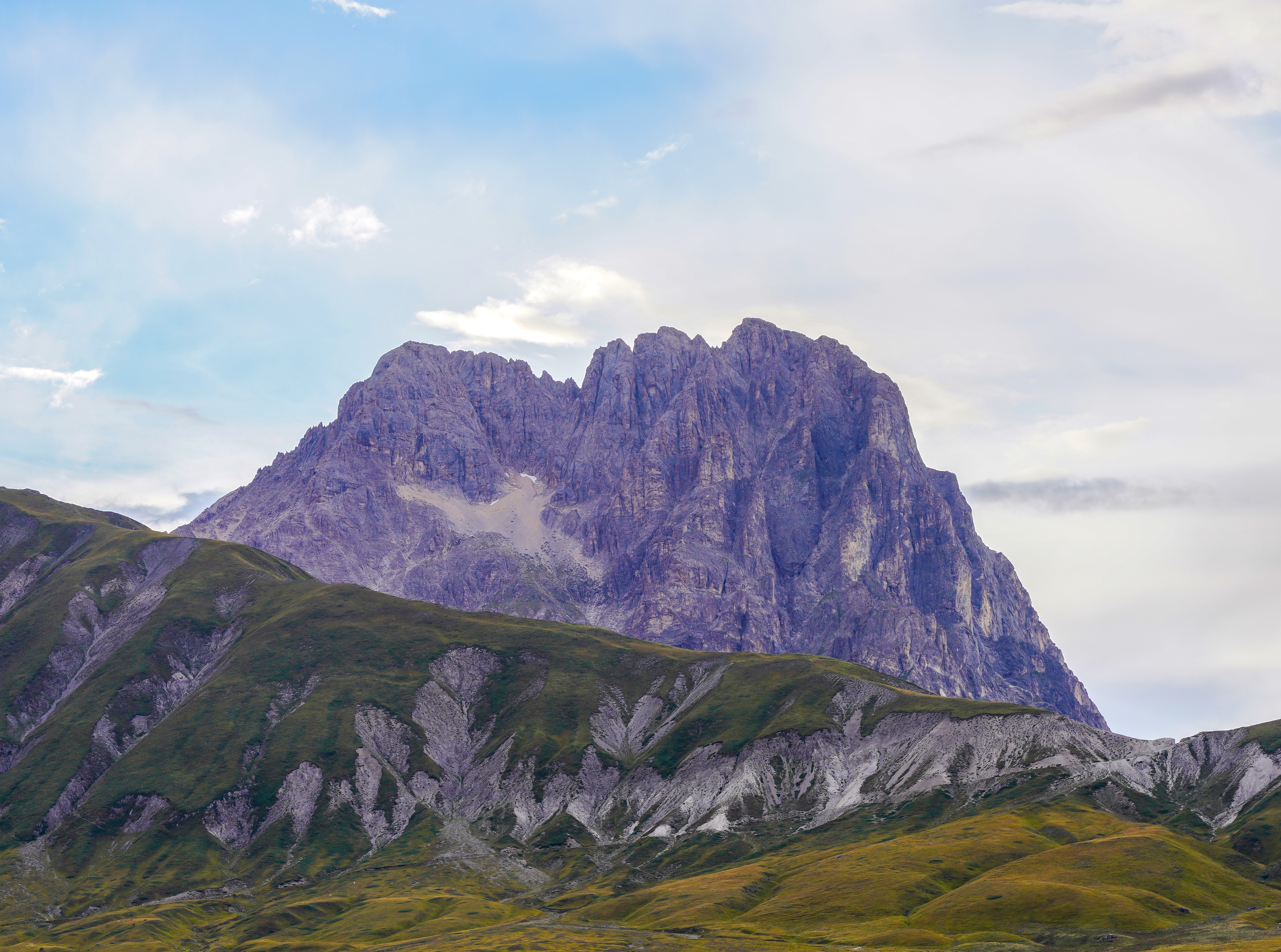
- Gran Sasso

- Location within Italy
- Nearest city: L'Aquila, Teramo
- Coordinates: 42°29′N 13°28′E
- Area: 1,413.31 km^{2} (545.68 sq mi)
- Established: 1991
- Governing body: Ministero dell'Ambiente
- Website: www.parks.it/parco.nazionale.gran.sasso/Eindex.html

The Gran Sasso and Monti della Laga National Park is a natural park in central Italy. Established in 1991, it covers an area of 2,014 square kilometres (778 mi^{2}), mostly within the provinces of Teramo, L'Aquila, and Pescara in Abruzzo, with small areas in the provinces of Rieti in Lazio and Ascoli Piceno in Marche. The terrain is predominantly mountainous with alpine plains.

It is managed by Ente Parco Nazionale Gran Sasso e Monti della Laga, with headquarters in Assergi, L'Aquila.

The Grand Highway of the Gran Sasso and Monti della Laga National Park runs through the park between the Gran Sasso mountain peak and the chain known as Monti della Laga.

== Geography ==
The park is one of the largest protected areas in Europe, and is centred around the massif of the Gran Sasso, which dominates the surrounding landscape; it rises vertically on the immense pastures of the Campo Imperatore. The land is very rocky and receives a large amount of snow and wind. The Calderone lies just beneath the tallest peak, the Corno Grande, and it is considered to be Europe's southernmost glacier. On the north side, there is the profile of the Monti della Laga chain, where thousands of migratory birds stop on the shores of Lake Campotosto. This area is completely covered by woods of beeches, firs, turkey oaks and chestnuts. There are over 200 kilometres (120 mi) of dedicated horse trails that can be used to visit the park.

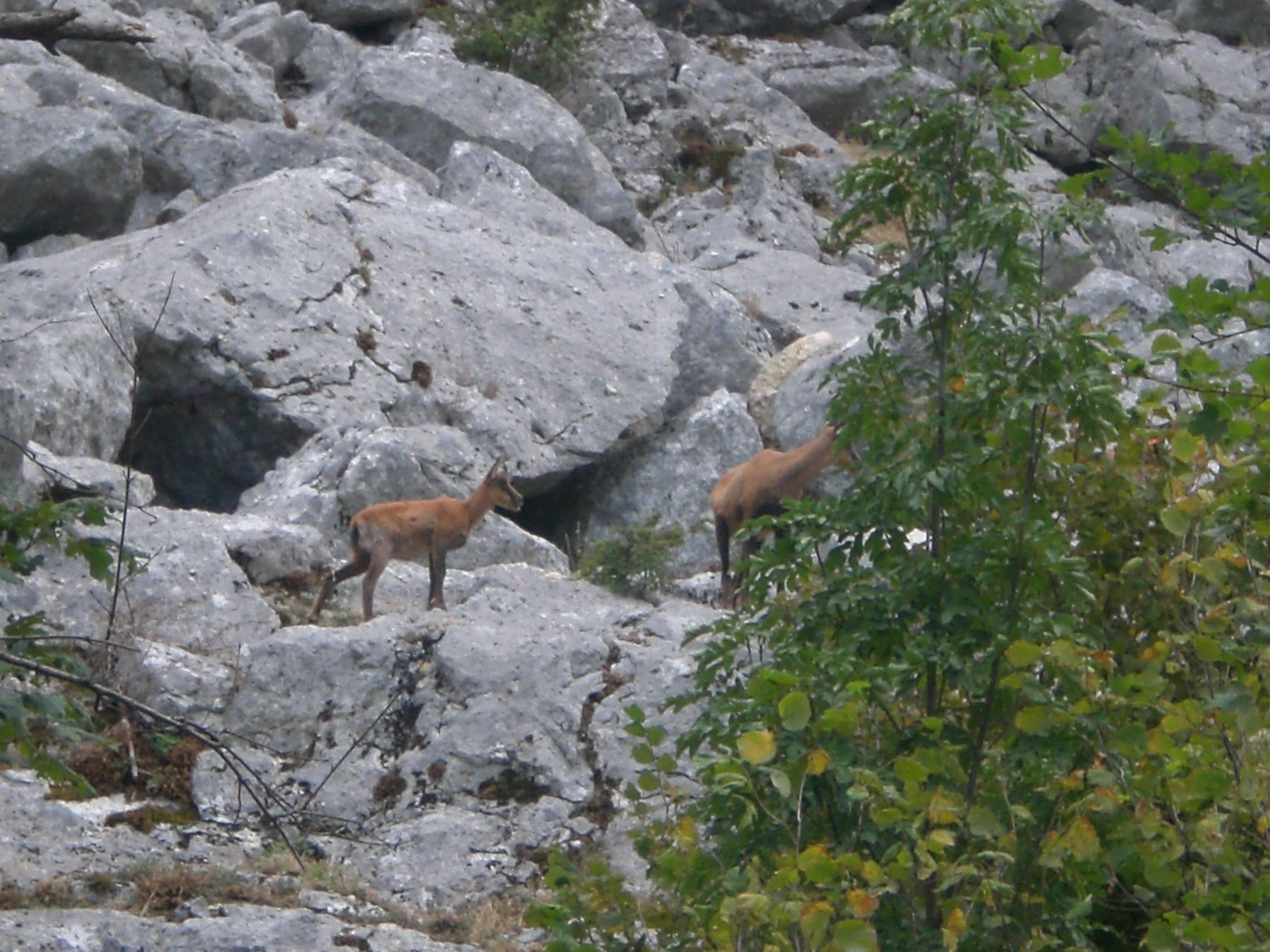
Abruzzo chamois on the Gran Sasso mountain

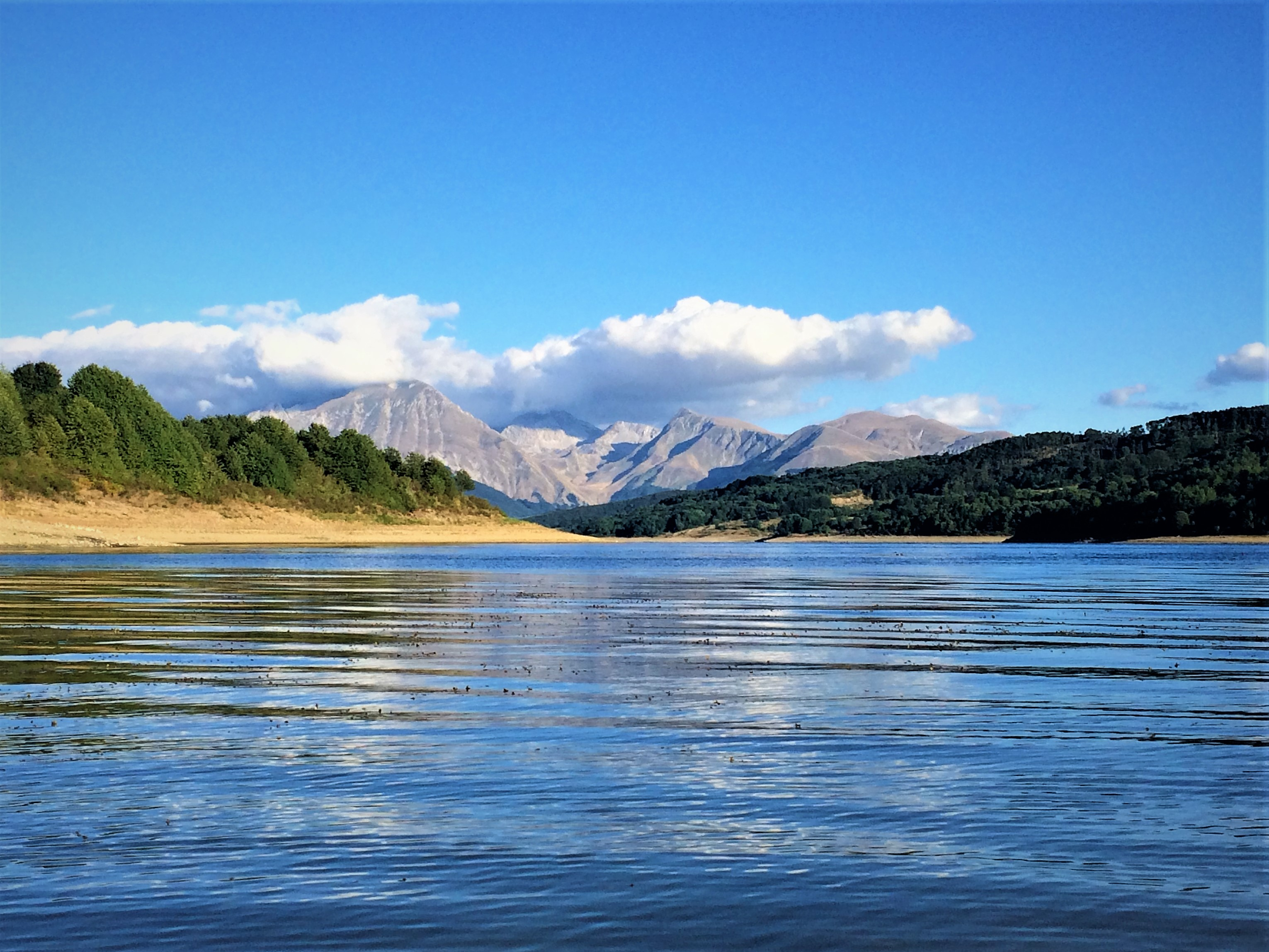
Campotosto Lake

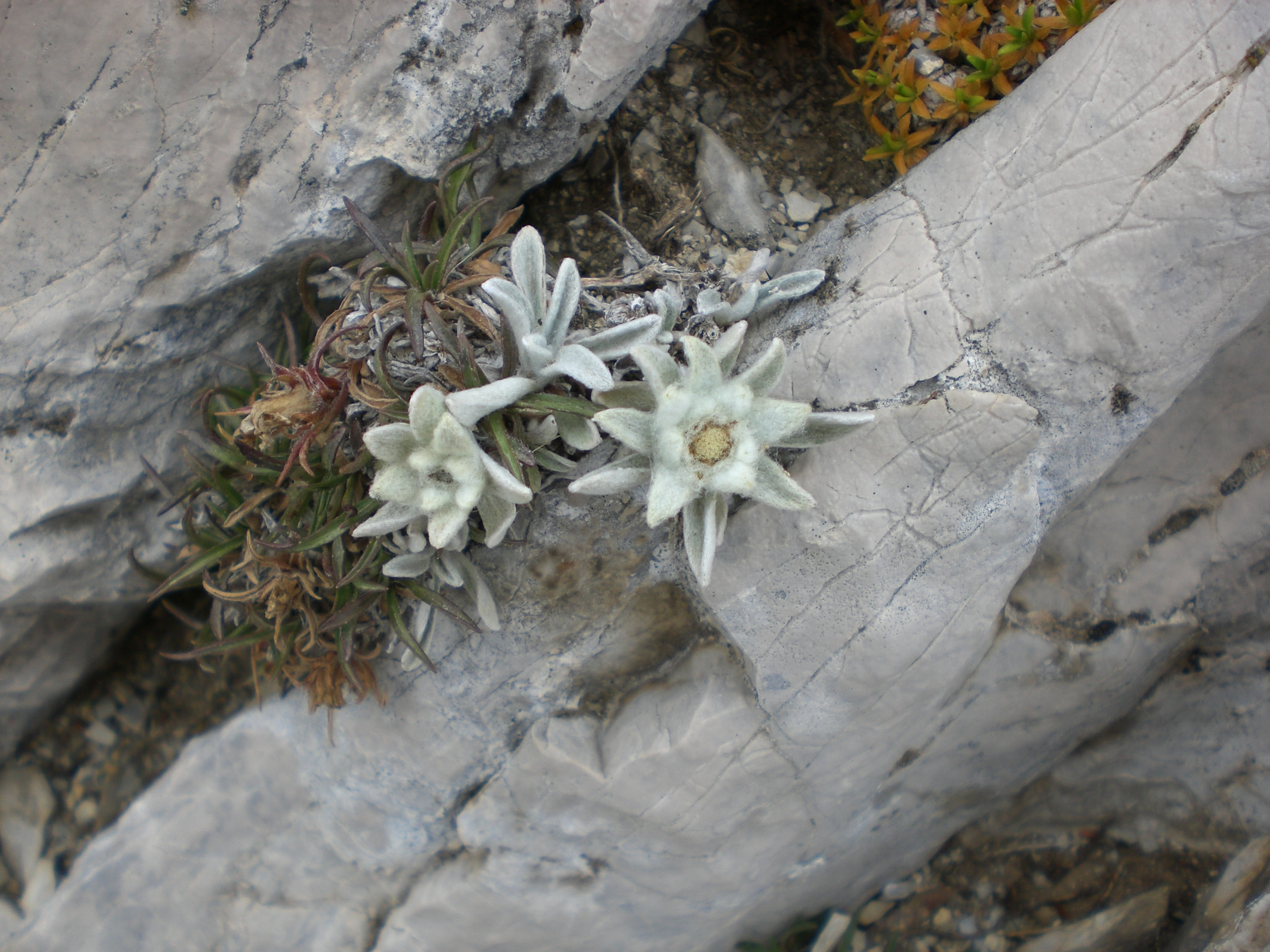
Abruzzo edelweiss on the Gran Sasso mountain - Monte Camicia

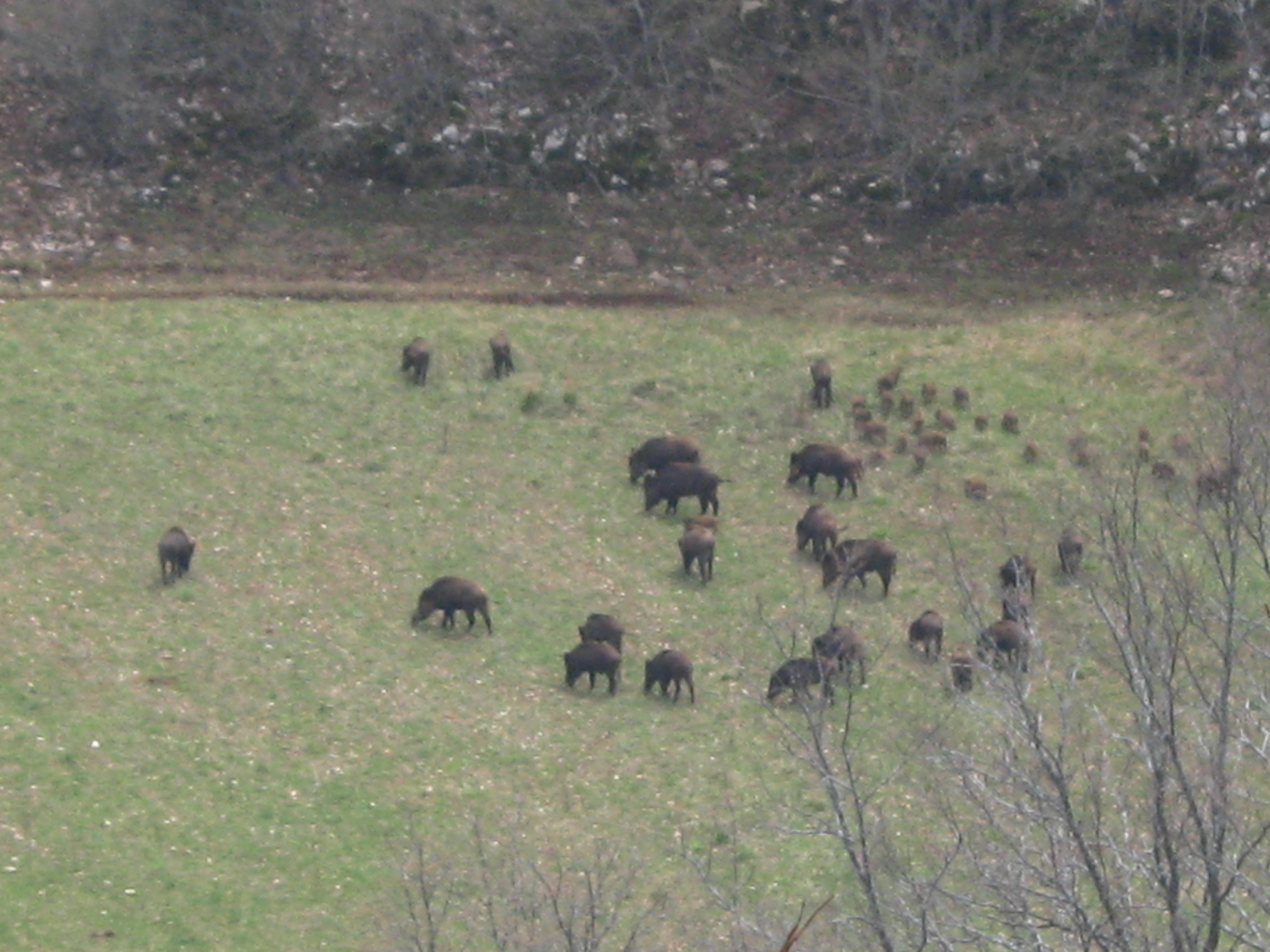
Abruzzo wild boars of the Gran Sasso National Park

== Nature and wildlife ==
The park contains one of the most biologically diverse areas of Europe. The climate is between that of the Mediterranean and that of the rest of continental Europe. The park contains more than two thousand plant species, some of which are found exclusively in this area, such as the Abruzzo Edelweiss. Many species of wildlife inhabit the park, including rare animals such as the Abruzzo chamois, as well as Apennine wolves, Marsican brown bear, roe deer, wildcats, wild boars, foxes and squirrels. Notable birds include the golden eagle, the white-backed woodpecker, the goshawk, the common buzzard and the peregrine falcon. There is also a wide variety of insects, such as the apollo butterfly.

== Attractions ==
The park contains a very long circuit of approximately 300 kilometres (190 mi) featuring trails that can be visited on horseback, by mountain bike, or on foot.

Many outdoor activities are possible within the park including hiking, horse riding, mountain biking, canoeing, bird watching, alpine skiing, ski mountaineering, and cross-country skiing.

Educational projects are active in the park visitor centres, and trails and paths can be freely explored alone or with the assistance of mountain guides.

== Settlements ==
Many old villages are located within the confines of the national park. They tend to be quite small, with stone and brick houses and narrow streets. In many cases, the place names highlight the defensive nature of the settlement and a summit position, such as Castel (castle), Rocca, Pizzo (peak), and Colle (hill).

- Province of L'Aquila

Assergi, Barete, Barisciano, Cagnano Amiterno, Calascio, Campotosto, Capestrano, Capitignano, Carapelle Calvisio, Castel del Monte, Castel Paganica, Castelvecchio Calvisio, L'Aquila, Lake Pietranzoni, Mascioni, Montereale, Ofena, Pizzoli, Santo Stefano di Sessanio, Villa Santa Lucia degli Abruzzi

- Province of Ascoli Piceno

Acquasanta Terme, Arquata del Tronto

- Province of Pescara

Brittoli, Bussi sul Tirino, Carpineto della Nora, Castiglione a Casauria, Civitella Casanova, Corvara, Farindola, Montebello di Bertona, Pescosansonesco, Villa Celiera

- Province of Rieti

Accumoli, Amatrice

- Province of Teramo

Arsita, Campli, Castelli, Civitella del Tronto, Cortino, Crognaleto, Fano Adriano, Isola del Gran Sasso d'Italia, Montorio al Vomano, Pietracamela, Rocca Santa Maria, Torricella Sicura, Tossicia, Valle Castellana.
