= Gran Sasso d'Italia =

Mountain located in central Italy

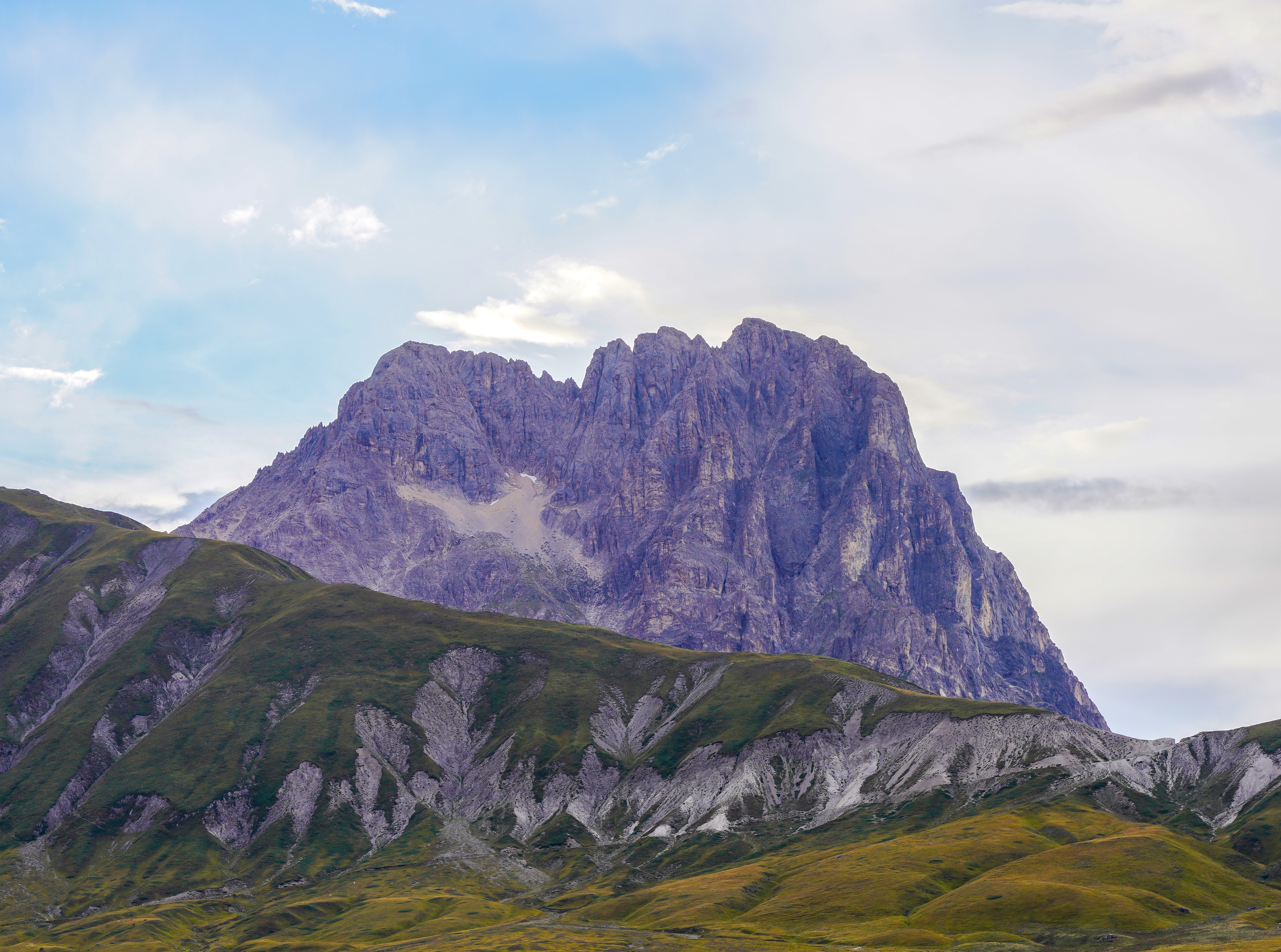
- Gran Sasso mountain, the highest peak in the Apennines

Highest point
- Elevation: 2,912 m (9,554 ft)
- Coordinates: 42°28′10″N 13°33′55″E

Geography
- Location within Italy
- Location: Abruzzo, Italy
- Parent range: Apennines

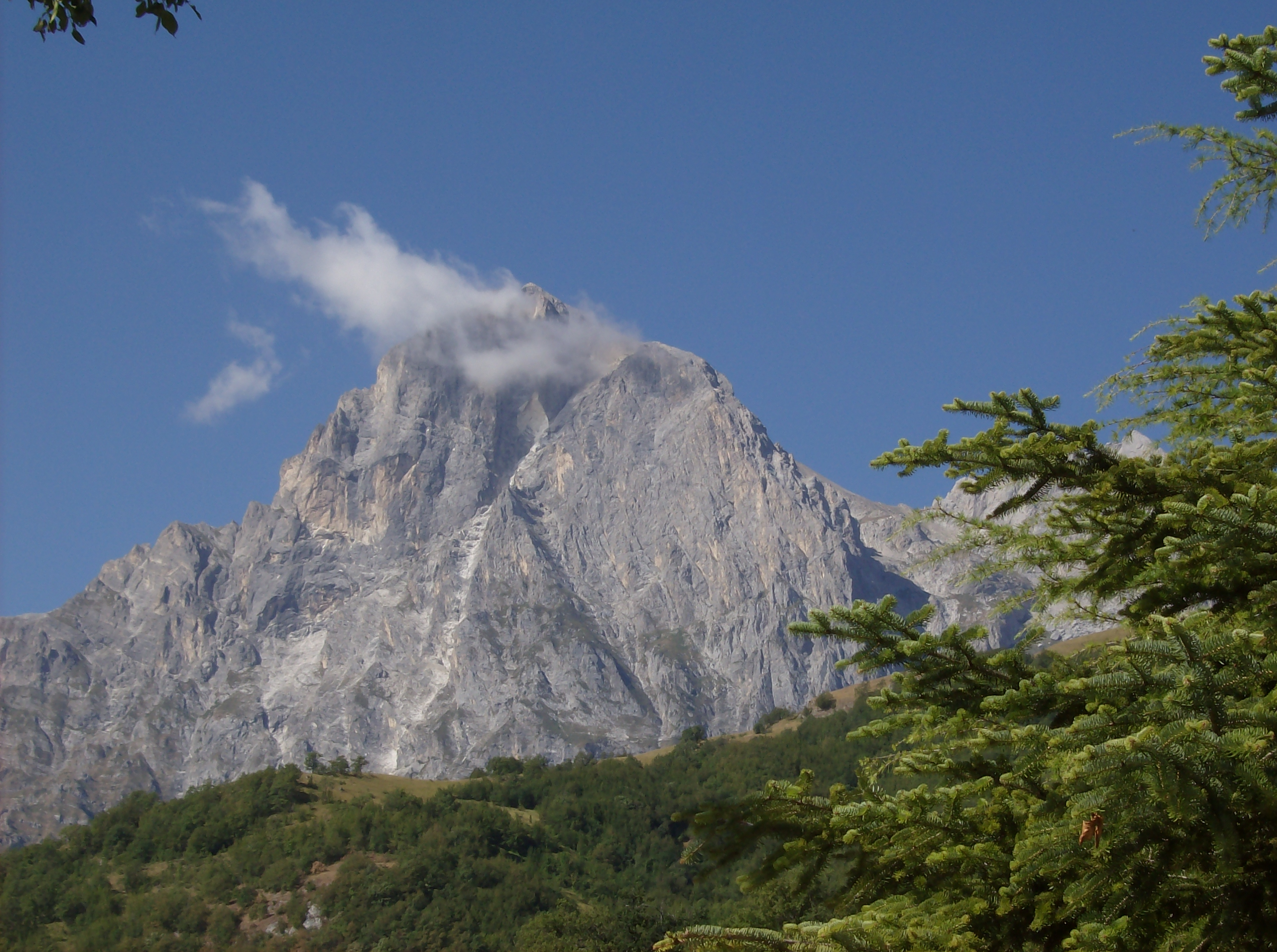
Corno Grande in the chain of Gran Sasso.

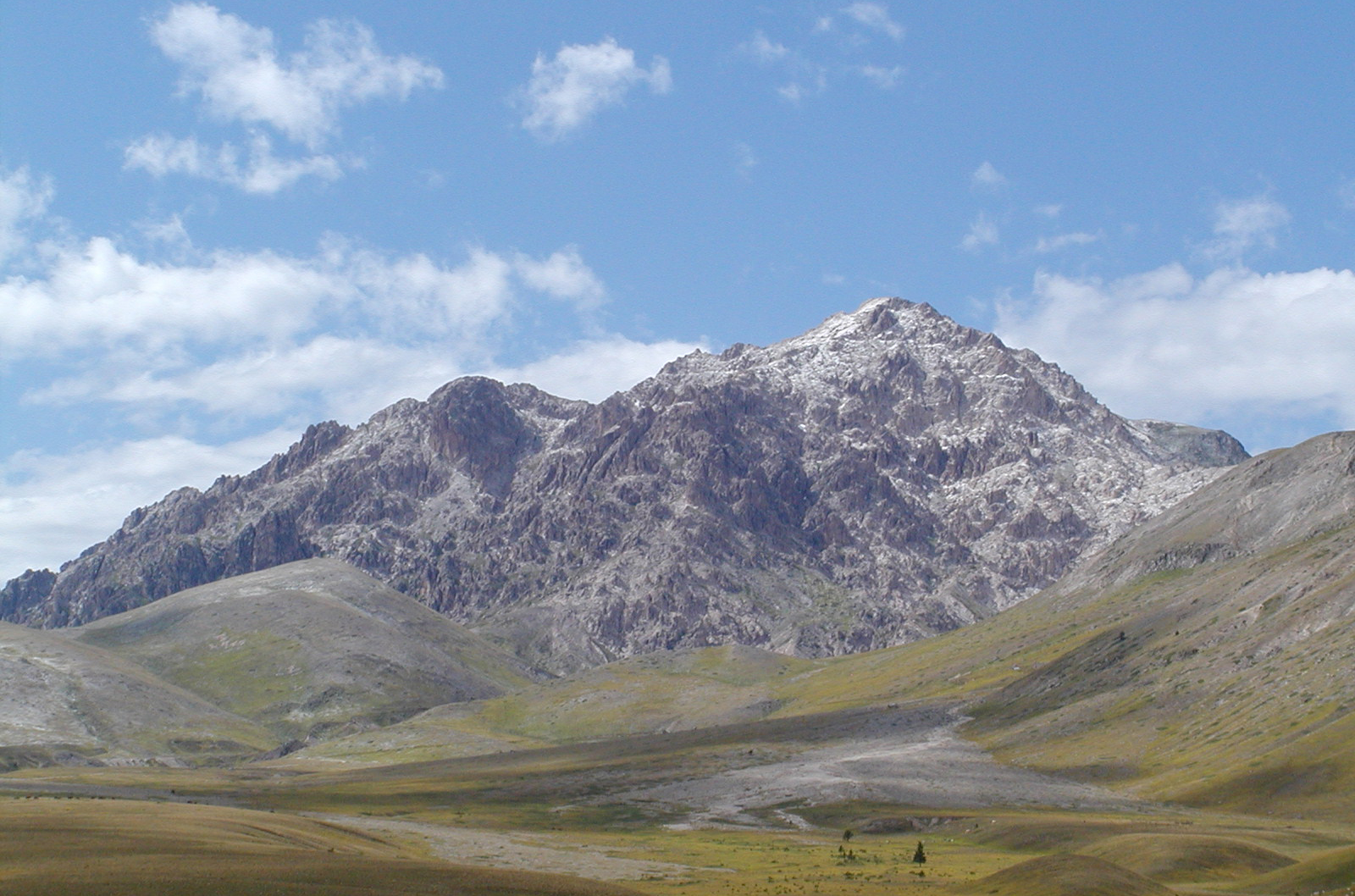
Monte Prena in the chain of Gran Sasso.

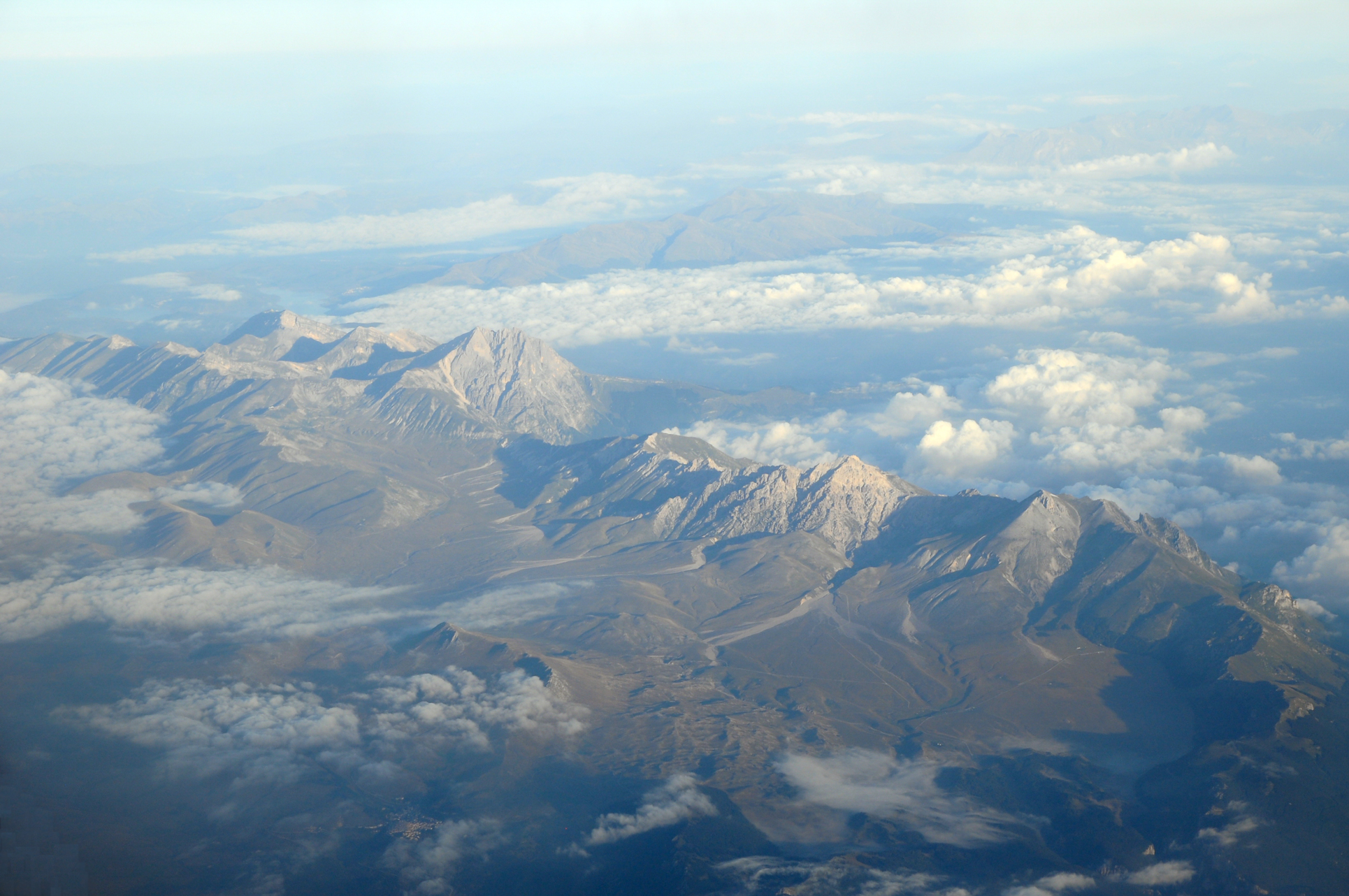
Panorama of Gran Sasso d'Italia. Monti della Laga is seen in the background.

Gran Sasso d'Italia (Italian: [ɡran ˈsasso diˈtaːlja]; lit. 'Great Rock of Italy') is a massif in the Apennine Mountains of Italy. Its highest peak, Corno Grande 2,912 metres (9,554 ft), is the highest mountain in the Apennines, and the second-highest mountain in Italy outside the Alps. The mountain lies within Gran Sasso and Monti della Laga National Park.

== Geography ==
The three main summits of the Gran Sasso are Corno Grande, which at 2,912 metres (9,554 feet) is the highest peak in the Apennines, nearby Corno Piccolo, and Pizzo d'Intermesoli, which is separated from the other two peaks by Val Maone, a deep valley. Corno Grande and Corno Piccolo's ash coloration come from their limestone and dolomite composition. The peaks are snow-covered for much of the year though the snow cover appears to be less each decade. Corno Piccolo is referred to as "The Sleeping Giant". This is due to the appearance of a profile of a reclined face. This view of Corno Piccolo is evident when viewing the mountain from Pietracamela, a small town near Prati di Tivo, on the north side of the mountain. Corno Grande and Corno Piccolo with their rough vertical walls provide serious rock climbers with challenges.

Situated below the peak of the Corno Grande is the Calderone glacier, although deglaciation has significantly reduced the glacier's size. Glaciologists now question whether the glacier will survive past 2030.

The mid- to lower slopes of the Gran Sasso are grazed in spring, summer and autumn by large flocks of sheep guarded by Maremmano-Abruzzese sheepdogs as well as herds of cattle and semi-wild horses. The pastures are covered with field grasses and meadowland wildflowers. The park is also the habitat for diverse wildlife from rare species such as the Apennine wolf, the Marsican bear, European wildcat and the Abruzzo chamois (Rupicapra pyrenaica ornata), a variety of chamois at the very edge of extinction but now making a comeback in the park through a joint effort by WWF Italia and the park administration. Other species of wildlife include wild boar, foxes, grass snakes such as Orsini's viper, and a wide variety of bird life including golden eagles, peregrine falcons, goshawks, ortolan buntings, rock sparrows, crested larks, red-backed shrikes and downy pipits.

At the northern base of Corno Piccolo is Prati di Tivo, a ski village. To the east of Corno Grande and Corno Piccolo lies Campo Imperatore, a 27-kilometre-long (17-mile) and 8-kilometre-wide (5.0-mile) high plain or plateau at about 2,000 metres (6,600 feet) height. Campo Imperatore is home to Italy's oldest continuously operating commercial ski area (connected to Fonte Cerreto via cable car).

== History ==
Hotel Campo Imperatore in Gran Sasso was Benito Mussolini's prison until his freeing in September 1943 by Nazi commandos in the Gran Sasso raid. The plateau is also the site of the Campo Imperatore station of the Rome Observatory, from which the Campo Imperatore Near-Earth Object Survey and other astronomical studies are carried out. At the southern edge of Campo Imperatore and within the bounds of the national park are three medieval hill towns once ruled by the Medicis; Calascio, which sits before the ancient fortress ruin of Rocca di Calascio, Santo Stefano di Sessanio, and Castel Del Monte.

In 2005, a 2,424-metre-high (7,953 ft) peak previously named "The Gendarme" was renamed "John Paul II Peak" on what would have been Pope John Paul II's 85th birthday. He had visited the Gran Sasso multiple times, saying it reminded him of the mountains of his native Poland.

In January 2017, an avalanche hit Rigopiano hotel, killing 29.

== Science ==
In 1984, a 10-kilometre (6.2-mile) two-lane highway tunnel carrying the A24 motorway, the Traforo del Gran Sasso, was bored through the Gran Sasso Massif. In 1995, a second parallel tunnel was completed. Construction of the tunnel included an underground particle physics laboratory at Assergi, the Laboratori Nazionali del Gran Sasso or Gran Sasso National Laboratory (LNGS). The first large experiments there started in 1989.

The laboratory is composed of three large underground chambers, sometimes referred to collectively as the third tunnel, and lies beneath 1,400 metres (4,600 feet) of rock. Construction of the laboratory and second tunnel faced opposition from Italian and international environmental groups including Pro-Natura International, LIPU and Club Alpino Italiano, as well as the World Wide Fund for Nature, Greenpeace, and Friends of the Earth. Environmentalists noted that the nuclear physics laboratory would lie on or near two major and highly active seismic faults, that construction of the tunnels would interfere with a major aquifer, and that construction waste would degrade an environmentally sensitive and significant area. Some credit the opposition created by the tunnel and laboratory construction with galvanizing the Italian environmental movement and leading to the creation of the Gran Sasso and Monti della Laga National Park in 1991. In recent years, the laboratory has itself begun promoting preservation of the Gran Sasso environment.

Because of its low background radiation, the underground laboratory is used for experiments in particle and nuclear physics, including the study of neutrinos, high-energy cosmic rays, dark matter, nuclear decay, as well as the study of geology, and biology. The laboratory employs over 700 scientists from twenty countries. The LNGS was the destination of the neutrinos involved in the faster-than-light neutrino anomaly publicly announced in September 2011 and retracted in July 2012. In the summer of 2014 the facility was instrumental in confirming previous theories about the Sun's main source of energy, when proton-to-proton fusion-produced neutrinos were detected and measured, virtually at the Sun's core.

== Tourism ==
The Gran Sasso is located in the Gran Sasso and Monti della Laga National Park. Running through this nature preserve is a portion of the Italian State Highway 80 (SS80), known as the Grand Highway of the Gran Sasso and Monti della Laga National Park ("Strada maestra del Parco").

While frequented by skiers in winter, and mountain climbers and hikers in other seasons, the Gran Sasso is remarkably free of tourists despite its proximity to Rome and the events of the Gran Sasso raid that took place there in 1943. This is especially true in summer with most Italians preferring beach vacations and foreign visitors are more likely to visit the mountains of northern Italy.

Pope John Paul II loved to secretly ski at Gran Sasso where he would retire often and pray at the church of San Pietro della Ienca. When he died Cardinal Stanislaw Dziwisz, gave the local Abruzzo community some of the late pontiff's blood as a token of the love he had felt for the mountainous area.

The Shrine of Gabriel of Our Lady of Sorrows at Isola del Gran Sasso d'Italia with average of two million visitors per year is one of the 15 most visited sanctuaries in the world.

Acclaimed international movies shot at Gran Sasso include Jean-Jacques Annaud's The Name of the Rose, Arnold Schwarzenegger's Red Sonja, Ladyhawke, King David, Keoma and The Barbarians.

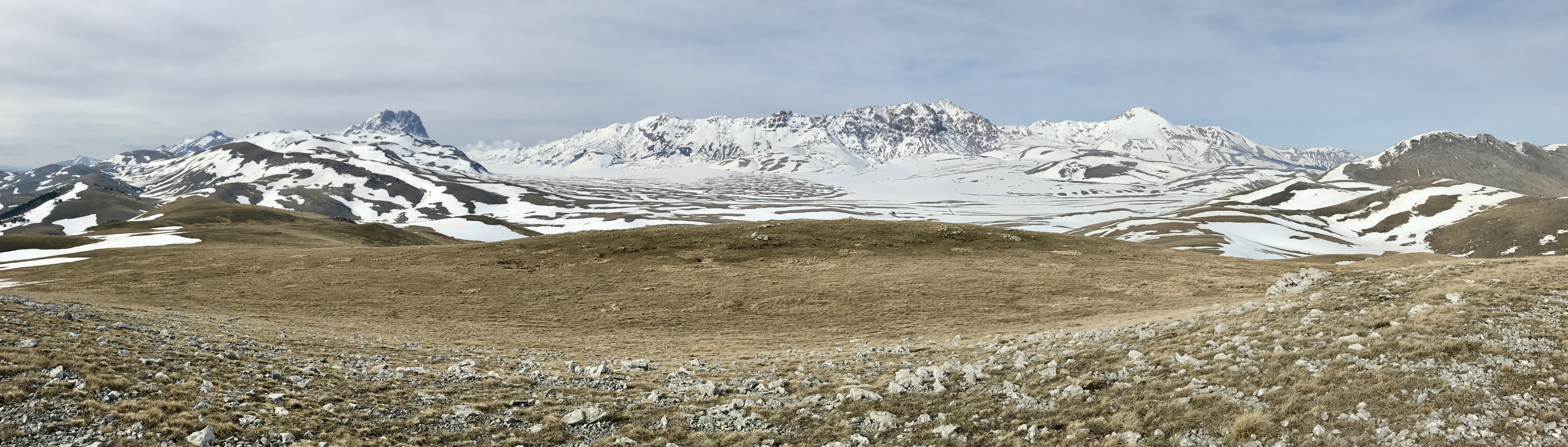
A panoramic view of Campo Imperatore.

== Points of interest ==
- Alpine Botanical Garden of Campo Imperatore
- Lake Pietranzoni
