= Castle of Rocca Calascio =

Mountaintop fortress in Abruzzo, Italy

- Castello di Rocca Calascio
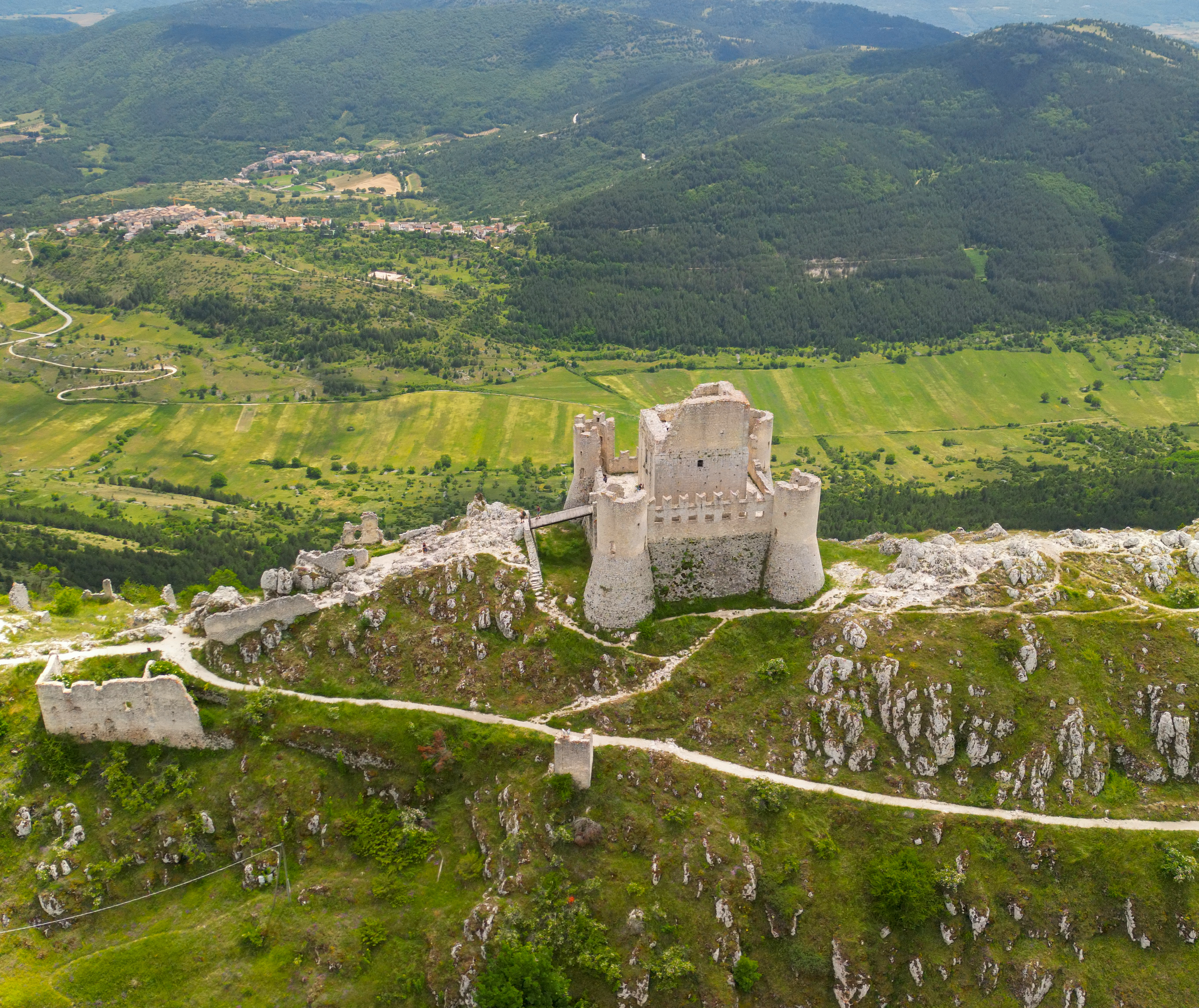

Site information
- Type: Fortress
- Condition: Partially ruinous

Location
- Coordinates: 42.328967°N 13.688944°E

Site history
- Built: 10th century
- Materials: stone and masonry

The Castle of Rocca Calascio is a mountaintop fortress or rocca in the municipality of Calascio, in the Province of L'Aquila, Abruzzo, Italy.

At an elevation of around 1,460 metres (4,790 ft), the castle is the highest fortress in the Apennines. Built of stone and masonry exclusively for military purposes and intended only to accommodate troops and never as a residence for nobles, the fortress overlooks the Plain of Navelli at one of the highest points in the ancient Barony of Carapelle.

Construction of the fortress started in the tenth century as a single watchtower. A walled courtyard with four cylindrical towers at the corners around a taller inner tower was added in the thirteenth century. The lower half of the fortress is built with distinctively larger stones than its upper half. It is believed that this feature was to make its base impenetrable to invaders. The fortress was never tested in battle. However, it was badly damaged in November 1461 by the 1461 L'Aquila earthquake with an estimated magnitude of 7 to 8 on the Richter Scale. While the town of Calascio, which lies below the fortress, was rebuilt, the fortress was not.

The Castle of Rocca Calascio lies within the Gran Sasso e Monti della Laga National Park and alongside the high plain of Campo Imperatore.

It has also been added to the Windows Spotlight image collection for the lock screen of Windows PC's

== Santa Maria della Pietà ==
Near the fortress, at a slightly lower elevation, is Santa Maria della Pietà, an octagonal church built in the seventeenth century.

== In media ==
The Castle of Rocca Calascio was the location for several scenes in the Richard Donner film Ladyhawke. Sequences for The Name of the Rose and The American were also filmed here.

== Gallery ==
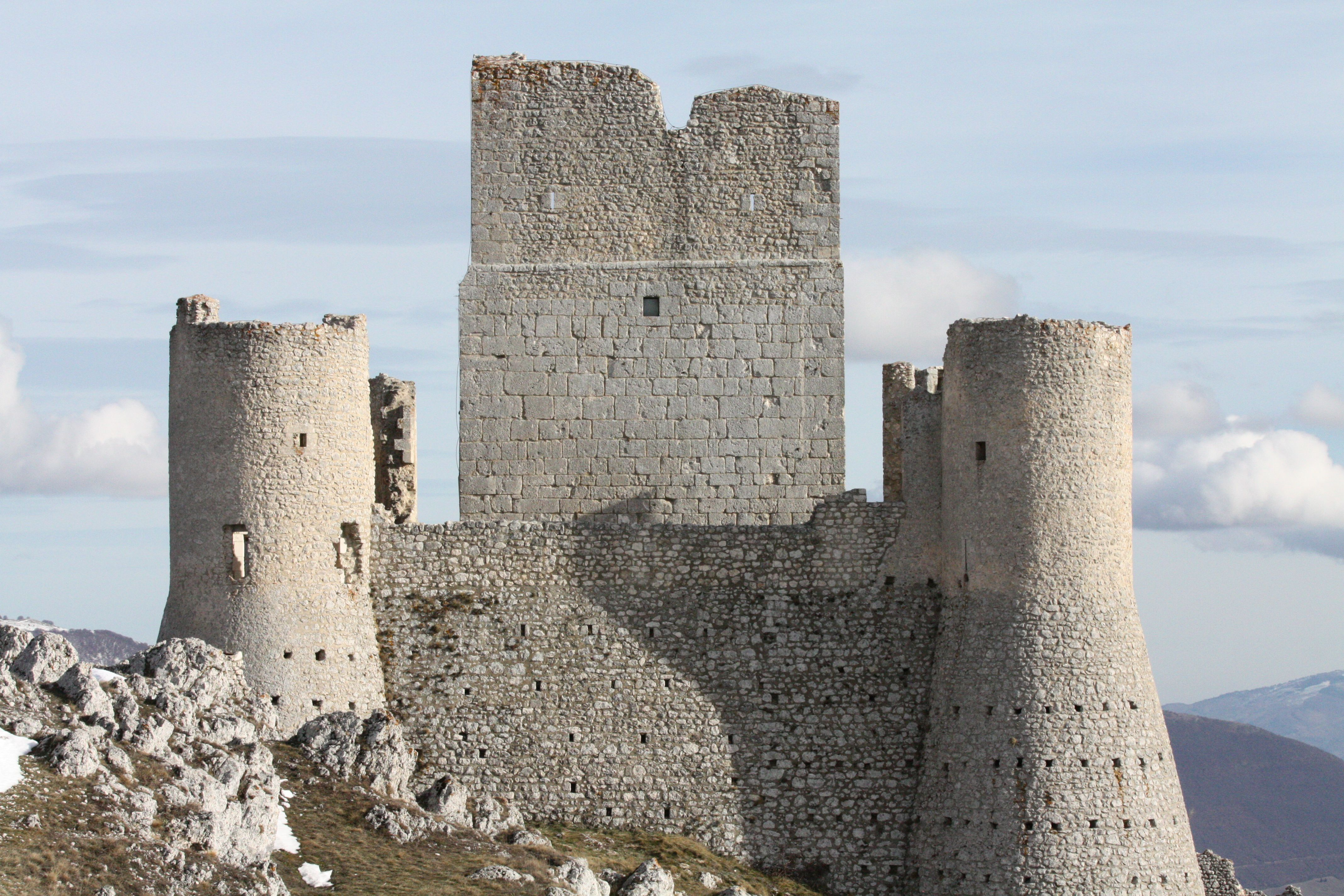
Castle of Rocca Calascio, the distinction is evident between larger stones for its lower half and smaller stones for the upper structure

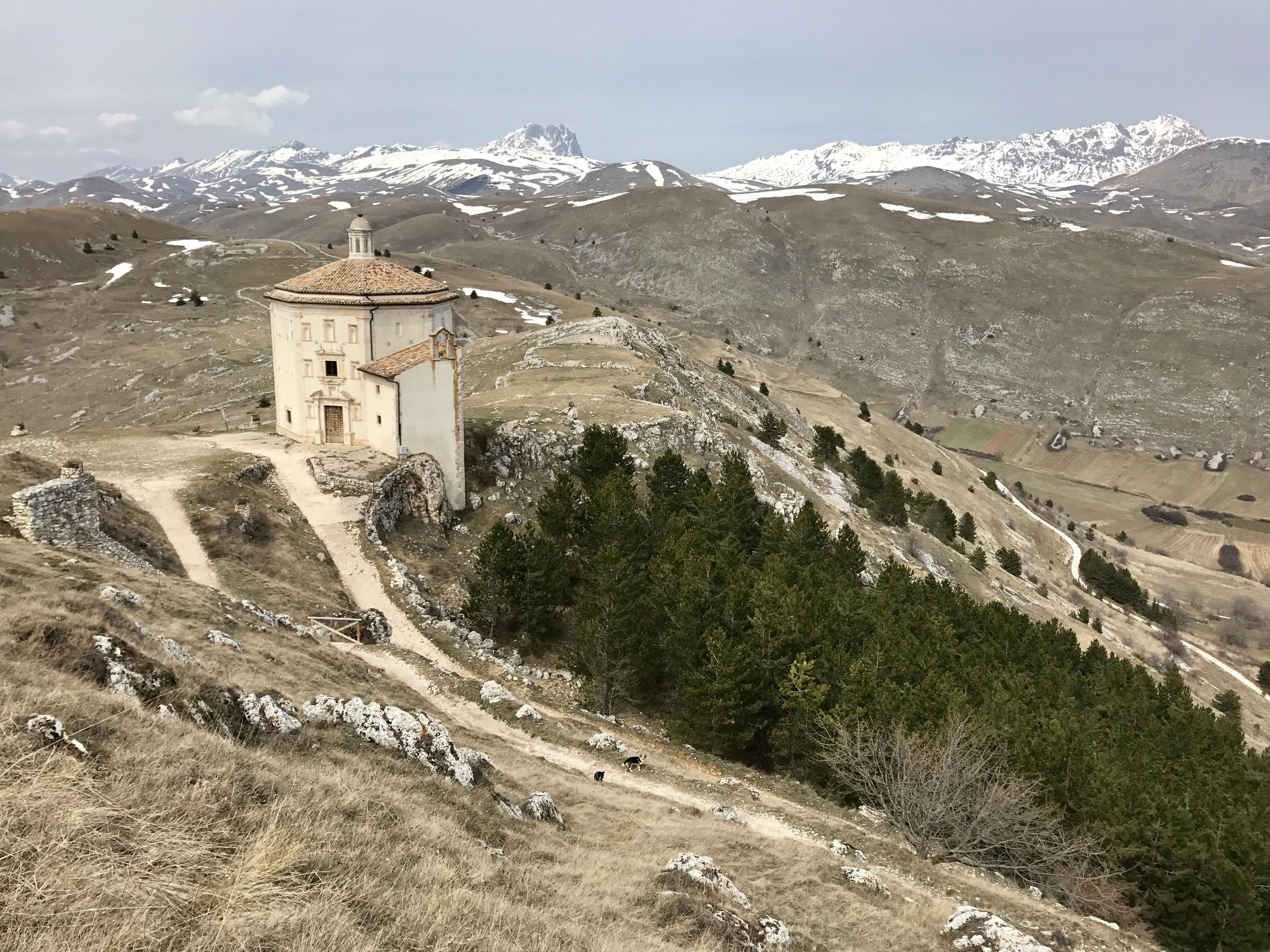
Santa Maria della Pietà and the Castle of Rocca Calascio.
