= Ladyhawke (film) =

1985 medieval dark fantasy film by Richard Donner

- Theatrical release poster
- Directed by: Richard Donner
- Screenplay by: Edward Khmara; Michael Thomas; Tom Mankiewicz; David Peoples (uncredited)
- Story by: Edward Khmara
- Produced by: Richard Donner; Lauren Shuler
- Starring: Matthew Broderick; Rutger Hauer; Michelle Pfeiffer; Leo McKern; John Wood
- Cinematography: Vittorio Storaro
- Edited by: Stuart Baird
- Music by: Andrew Powell
- Production companies: Warner Bros.; 20th Century Fox; Lauren Shuler Production
- Distributed by: Warner Bros. (North America); 20th Century Fox (International)
- Release date: April 12, 1985 (United States)
- Running time: 121 minutes
- Countries: United States; Italy; United Kingdom
- Language: English
- Budget: $20 million
- Box office: $18.4 million

Ladyhawke is a 1985 medieval fantasy film directed and produced by Richard Donner and starring Matthew Broderick, Rutger Hauer, and Michelle Pfeiffer. The story is about a young thief who becomes unwillingly involved with a warrior and his lady who are hunted by the Bishop of Aquila. As he learns about the couple's past and secret, he chooses to help them overcome the Bishop's forces, and to lift an infernal curse.

Ladyhawke was released on April 12, 1985 by Warner Bros. in the United States, with 20th Century Fox releasing in other territories. The film received positive reviews from critics but underperformed at the box office, grossing $18.4 million against a $20 million budget. In the same year, Joan D. Vinge published a novelization of the film, also titled Ladyhawke.

== Plot ==
In medieval Italy, Phillipe Gaston, a thief known as "The Mouse", escapes from the Bishop of Aquila's dungeons through the sewers right before his execution; angering the bishop who fears Phillipe's escape will inspire rebellion. He is soon apprehended at an inn by Captain Marquet and the Bishop's guards. However, the former captain Etienne of Navarre arrives and rescues him. They ride off while Navarre's hawk scatters the guards along the way.

Navarre and Phillipe ask for lodging at a farmer's barn. At dusk, the farmer ambushes Phillipe with an axe, but is killed by an enormous black wolf. Phillipe runs back to the barn to get Navarre's help, but instead finds a beautiful young woman dressed in Navarre's cloak, who calmly approaches the wolf and walks into the woods with it.

Two days later, Navarre reveals he needs Phillipe's help in his quest to kill the Bishop. Phillipe refuses, and gets tied up to a tree. That night he sees the young woman again, and tricks her into cutting his bonds, but is soon recaptured by the guards. They learn Navarre's traveling direction from him and set up an ambush. Navarre once again fights off the guards, and Phillipe breaks free. However, both Navarre and his hawk are wounded by crossbow bolts.

The injured Navarre orders Phillipe to take the hawk to the ruined castle of an old monk named Imperius. Imperius sequesters the hawk in a locked room, but Phillipe picks the lock and is shocked to find the young woman, now with a bolt protruding from her chest. After treating her wound, Imperius explains to Phillipe that she is Isabeau of Anjou, who once refused the Bishop's advances. After learning from a drunken Imperius that Navarre and Isabeau were married, the Bishop called down a satanic curse, dooming Isabeau as a hawk by day and Navarre as a wolf each night.

The Bishop's guards raid the castle shortly before daybreak, but Isabeau turns into a hawk at sunrise and flies away to safety. Navarre catches up to the castle and dispatches the last of the guards. Imperius tells him that the curse can be broken if the couple face the Bishop as man and woman on "a day without a night and a night without a day". Navarre dismisses Imperius as a drunk, and continues his way to Aquila, intent on simply killing the Bishop for revenge. Phillipe volunteers to join Navarre and "Ladyhawke," and bids Imperius to follow them.

After the group survives an encounter with the Bishop's wolf-trapper Cezar, and Phillipe saves the Navarre-wolf from a frozen river, Phillipe finally convinces Navarre to break the curse. Phillipe dives back into Aquila through the sewers while Imperius and Isabeau smuggle the Navarre-wolf inside. On the next day, Navarre, seeing no divine signs, once again decides to kill the Bishop, and asks Imperius to euthanize the Isabeau-hawk if the church bells ring, as this would signal Navarre's failure.

Phillipe infiltrates the cathedral and unlocks its doors. Navarre rides in and duels with Marquet. The sudden occurrence of a solar eclipse makes Navarre realize Imperius was right, but he fails to stop the Bishop's guards from ringing the bells. Believing that Imperius has slain Isabeau, Navarre continues his fight and kills Marquet.

As Navarre is about to strike down the Bishop, a now-human Isabeau enters the cathedral and stops him. Together they face the Bishop and break the curse. The maddened Bishop tries to kill Isabeau, only to die by Navarre's sword. Isabeau and Navarre thank Phillipe and Imperius, and finally embrace in joy.

== Cast ==
- Matthew Broderick as Phillipe Gaston, an escaped thief known as "The Mouse".
- Rutger Hauer as Etienne of Navarre, the former captain of the guard of Aquila, who is hunted by the Bishop and cursed to be a wolf by night.
  - Akeela, Kollchek, Levi, and Sasha—a quartet of melanistic Siberian wolves—as Navarre's lupine form.
- Michelle Pfeiffer as Isabeau of Anjou, the Comte d'Anjou's daughter, who is hunted by the Bishop and cursed to be a hawk by day.
  - Gift (c. 1979 – 2 or 3 December 2014) and Ladyhawke (d. May 2007; named Spike II until 2000)—two female red-tailed hawks—as Isabeau's avian form.
- Leo McKern as Imperius, an old monk living in a ruined castle who used to serve the Bishop.
- John Wood as the Bishop of Aquila, who is obsessed with killing Navarre and capturing Isabeau.
- Ken Hutchison as Captain Marquet, the current captain of the guard.
- Alfred Molina as Cezar, a wolf trapper who serves the Bishop.
- Giancarlo Prete as Fornac, a guard lieutenant.
- Loris Loddi as Jehan, a guard lieutenant.

== Production ==
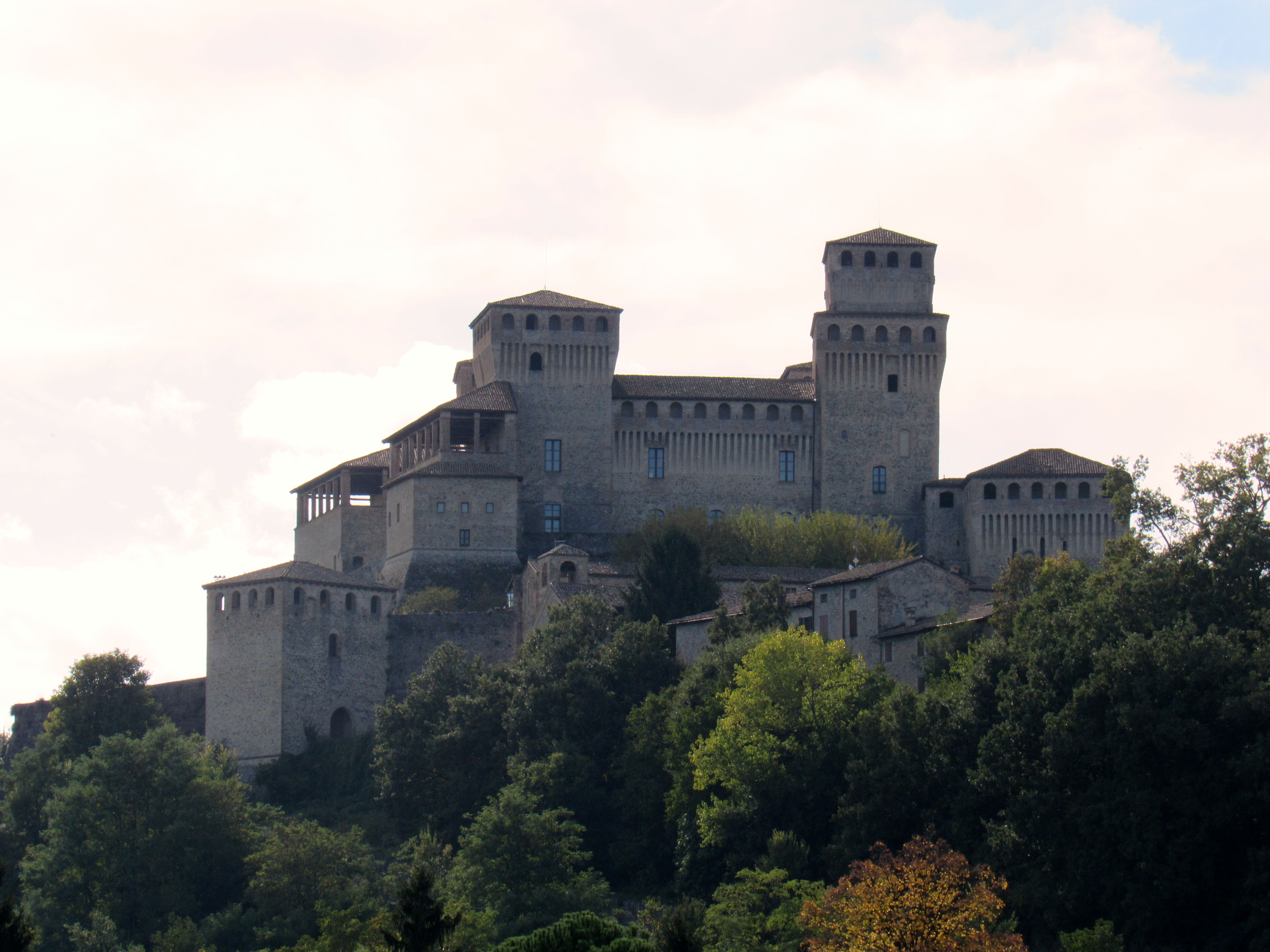
Torrechiara, province of Parma, the movie's castle

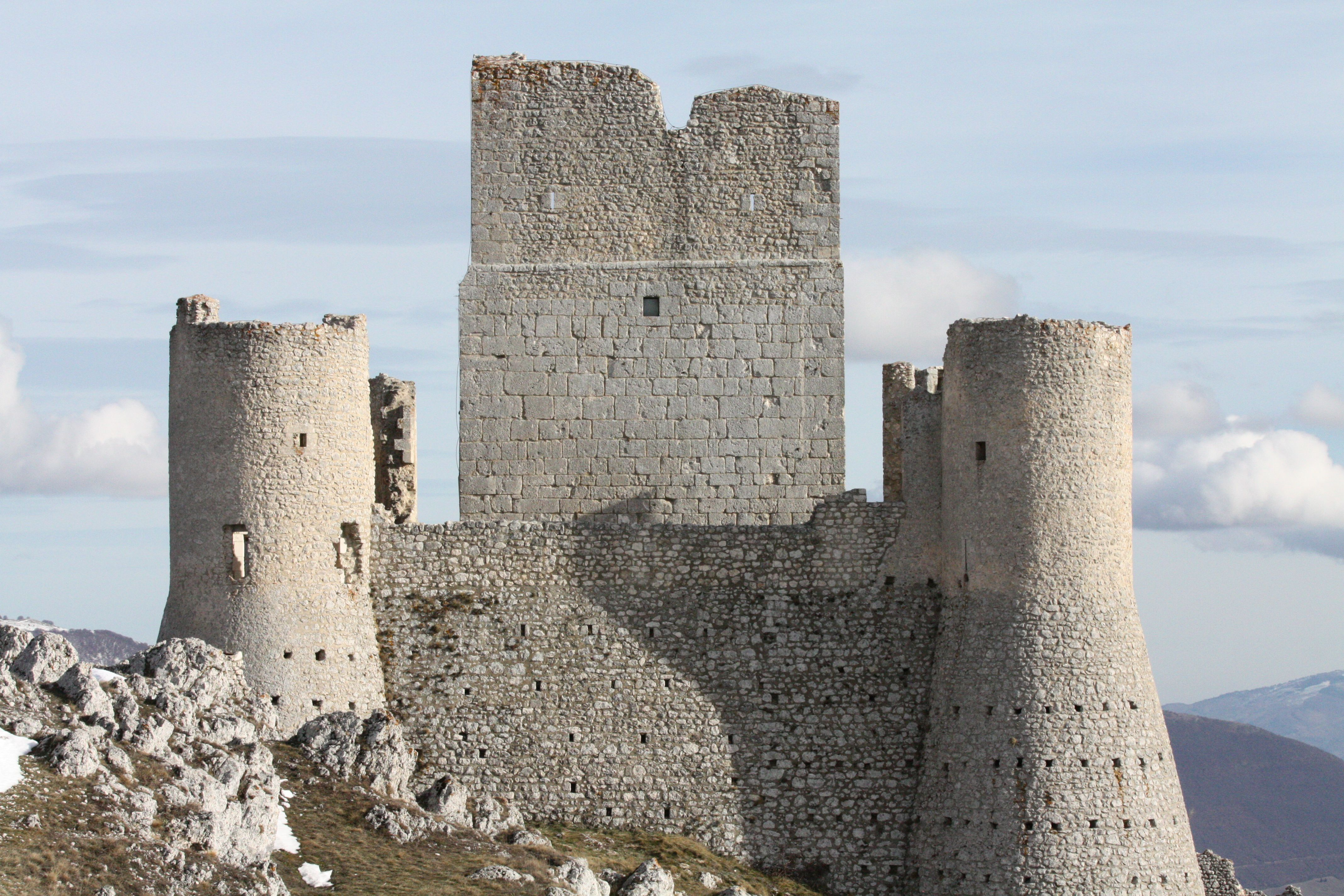
The castle of Rocca Calascio in Abruzzo, where the priest Imperius hosts the protagonists to heal them.

Richard Donner had attempted to get the film financed for a number of years and came close to making it twice, once in England and once in Czechoslovakia. He eventually got the project up at Warner Bros. and 20th Century Fox, where it was green-lit by Alan Ladd Jr. Originally, Kurt Russell was cast as the male lead alongside Michelle Pfeiffer. The role of the pickpocket was offered to Sean Penn and then Dustin Hoffman, before Donner decided to go with Matthew Broderick. Eventually, Russell pulled out during rehearsals, and Rutger Hauer was chosen to replace him.

Writer Edward Khmara stated "The story of two lovers kept apart by taking human form only at opposite times of day was an inspiration that occurred to me while jogging on the roof of the Hollywood YMCA. The studio contention that 'Ladyhawke' is based on an old legend is, in fact, a violation of Writers Guild rules, since it denies me full rights of authorship. The Guild undertook an action against Warner Bros, on this account … and a small amount of money was paid as compensation ... Warner Bros., or its publicity department, continues to circulate material restating the old legend story. The inspiration for the character of Phillipe the Mouse was Francois Villon. His 'Testament' recounts his imprisonment and mistreatment by Bishop Thibault d'Aussigny, in the dungeons of Meung. When the Dauphin, soon to be Louis XI of France, passed through Meung on his way to the coronation, he freed the prisoners, including Villon. This incident was actually used in the original story of 'Ladyhawke.'"

=== Filming locations ===
Ladyhawke was filmed in Italy; the Apennine meadow of Campo Imperatore in Abruzzo served as a prominent exterior location, while the monk scene was filmed at Rocca Calascio, a ruined fortress on top of a mountain, not far from real-world L'Aquila. In the region of Emilia-Romagna, the town of Castell'Arquato in the province of Piacenza and castle of Torrechiara in the province of Parma were also featured. Another Italian location was Soncino in the Lombardy region.

=== Soundtrack ===
Professional ratings
Review scores
Source	Rating
AllMusic	link

Andrew Powell composed the score, and it was produced by Alan Parsons. Richard Donner stated that he was listening to The Alan Parsons Project (on which Powell collaborated) while scouting for locations, and became unable to separate his visual ideas from the music. Powell combined traditional orchestral music and Gregorian chant with contemporary progressive rock–infused material. At the time, it was part of a trend among 1980s fantasy films of abandoning the lush orchestral scores of composers such as John Williams, James Horner, and Jerry Goldsmith in favor of a modern pop/rock sound. The soundtrack album was released in 1985 and re-released with additional tracks in 1995. On February 10, 2015, a two-disc set was released by La-La Land Records; it includes previously unreleased music and bonus tracks and was limited to 3,000 units.

The film soundtrack, composed by Andrew Powell, has met some criticism, with some saying the synthesizer laden track is incongruous for a medieval-themed movie, while others were more critical, with one reviewer calling it the "cream of the crop when it comes to atrocious scores" and another saying it sounded like an "exercise video that got played on top of a low budget '80s sitcom". It has been placed at the top of a list of worst movie soundscores, and appears on three other lists of bad movie music. Another commentator calls it one of the most "widely mocked soundtracks in the history of film".

Powell has commented on the poor reception to the soundtrack, explaining that he did not in fact use a lot of rock music in it, and that the criticism was not warranted because even a "classical" soundtrack would still be anachronistic. He has not worked on many film soundtracks since.

== Reception ==
=== Box office ===
The film was a box-office disappointment, grossing around $18.4 million against a $20 million budget and ranking 48th for the year at the North American box office.

=== Critical response ===
Ladyhawke has a rating of 68% on Rotten Tomatoes, based on 31 critics' reviews. The site's consensus states: "There's pacing problems, but Ladyhawke has an undeniable romantic sweep that's stronger than most fantasy epics of its ilk." Metacritic, which uses a weighted average, assigned the film a score of 64 out of 100, based on 11 critics, indicating "generally favorable" reviews.

Vincent Canby in The New York Times called the film "divided against itself", and went on to say that "scenes of high adventure or of visual splendor... are spliced between other scenes with dialogue of a banality that recalls the famous Tony Curtis line, 'Yondah lies my faddah's castle.'" Time Out called it "all rather facile sword-and-sorcery stuff, of course, but at times very funny... and always beautifully photographed". Variety described the film as a "very likeable, very well-made fairytale... worthwhile for its extremely authentic look alone". Siskel and Ebert both gave the film positive "thumbs up" reviews on their syndicated television show and thought Ladyhawke was beautifully filmed with the potential to achieve lasting success as a classic in its genre. Siskel's only major complaint was that Broderick's role was almost anachronistic in his 1980s-style jokes, while Ebert felt Broderick's comedic elements were fitting.

The New York Times singled out Matthew Broderick's skill in coming "very close to transforming contemporary wisecracks – particularly, his asides to God – into a more ageless kind of comedy", and said of Michelle Pfeiffer that her "presence, both ethereal and erotic, is so vivid that even when she's represented as a hawk, she still seems to be on the screen". Variety praised the casting of the lead actors, considering Pfeiffer "perfect as the enchanting beauty". Time Out called Rutger Hauer "camp" and Pfeiffer "decorative".

Colin Greenland reviewed Ladyhawke for Imagine magazine, and stated that "a singular tale of witchcraft, love and courage, with a fascinating idea that it almost makes the most of".

John Nubbin reviewed Ladyhawke for Different Worlds magazine and stated that "It is extremely well filmed, but not very well thought out. And, although this isn't the first time such a thing has happened, one gets to the point where such productions go beyond a shake of the head and a shrugging, 'Oh, well.'."

Matthew Broderick received criticism for his attempted British accent in his portrayal of Phillipe Gaston, an example of the convention of using British accents in historical or medieval settings. One reviewer described the performance as displaying an "uncertainty with a British accent" that was "periodically cringeworthy and sporadically risible".

=== Accolades ===
Award	Category	Nominee(s)	Result	Ref.
Academy Awards	Best Sound	Les Fresholtz, Dick Alexander, Vern Poore, and Bud Alper	Nominated	
Academy Awards	Best Sound Effects Editing	Bob Henderson and Alan Murray	Nominated	
Saturn Awards	Best Fantasy Film		Won	
Saturn Awards	Best Actress	Michelle Pfeiffer	Nominated	
Saturn Awards	Best Costumes	Nanà Cecchi	Won	
Saturn Awards	Best Music	Andrew Powell	Nominated	

== See also ==
- List of films featuring eclipses
