= Campo Imperatore =

Alpine meadow region of Italy

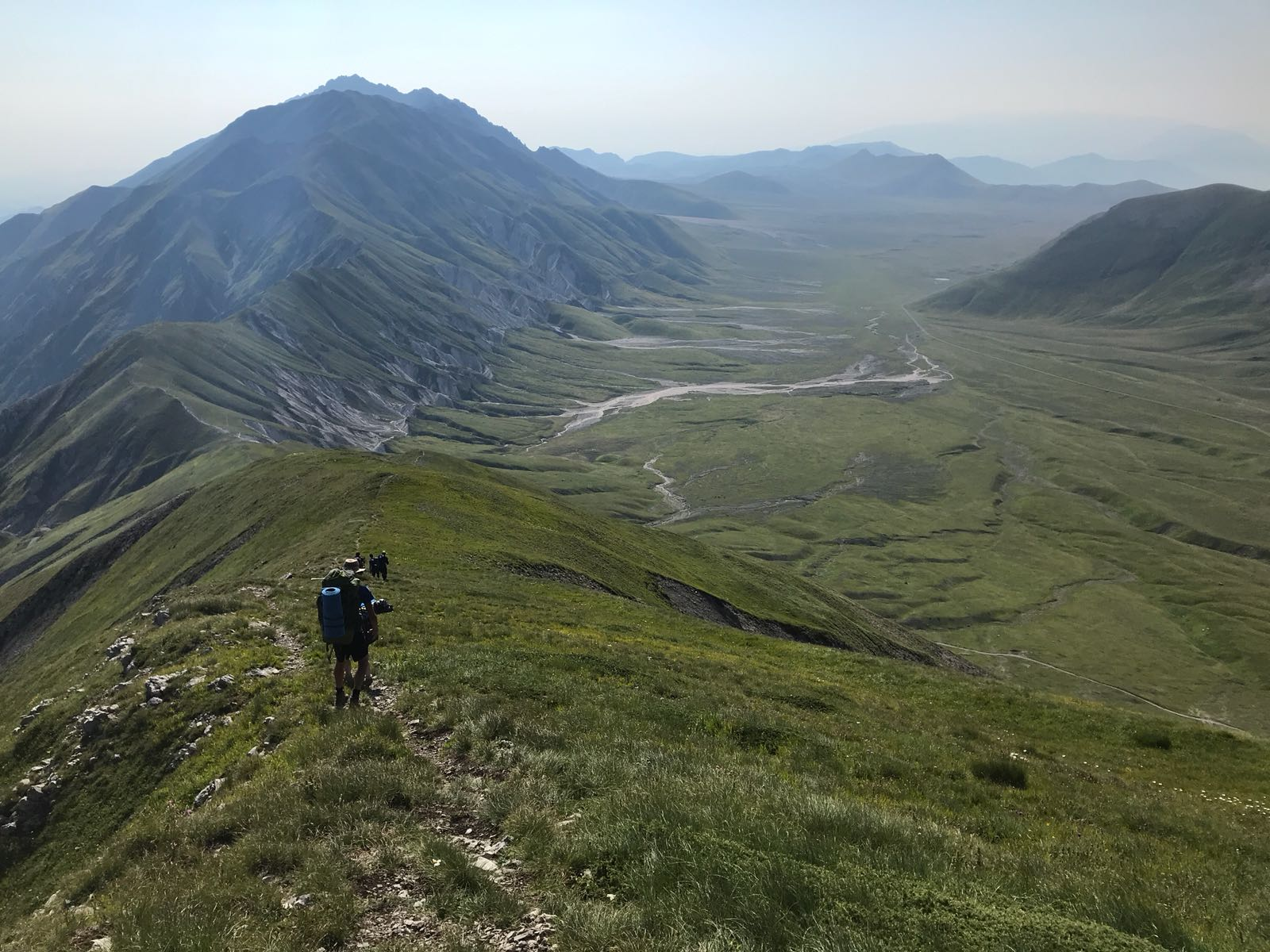

Geography
- Location: Province of L'Aquila, Abruzzo, Italy
- Coordinates: 42°26′31″N 13°35′16″E
- Interactive map of Campo Imperatore

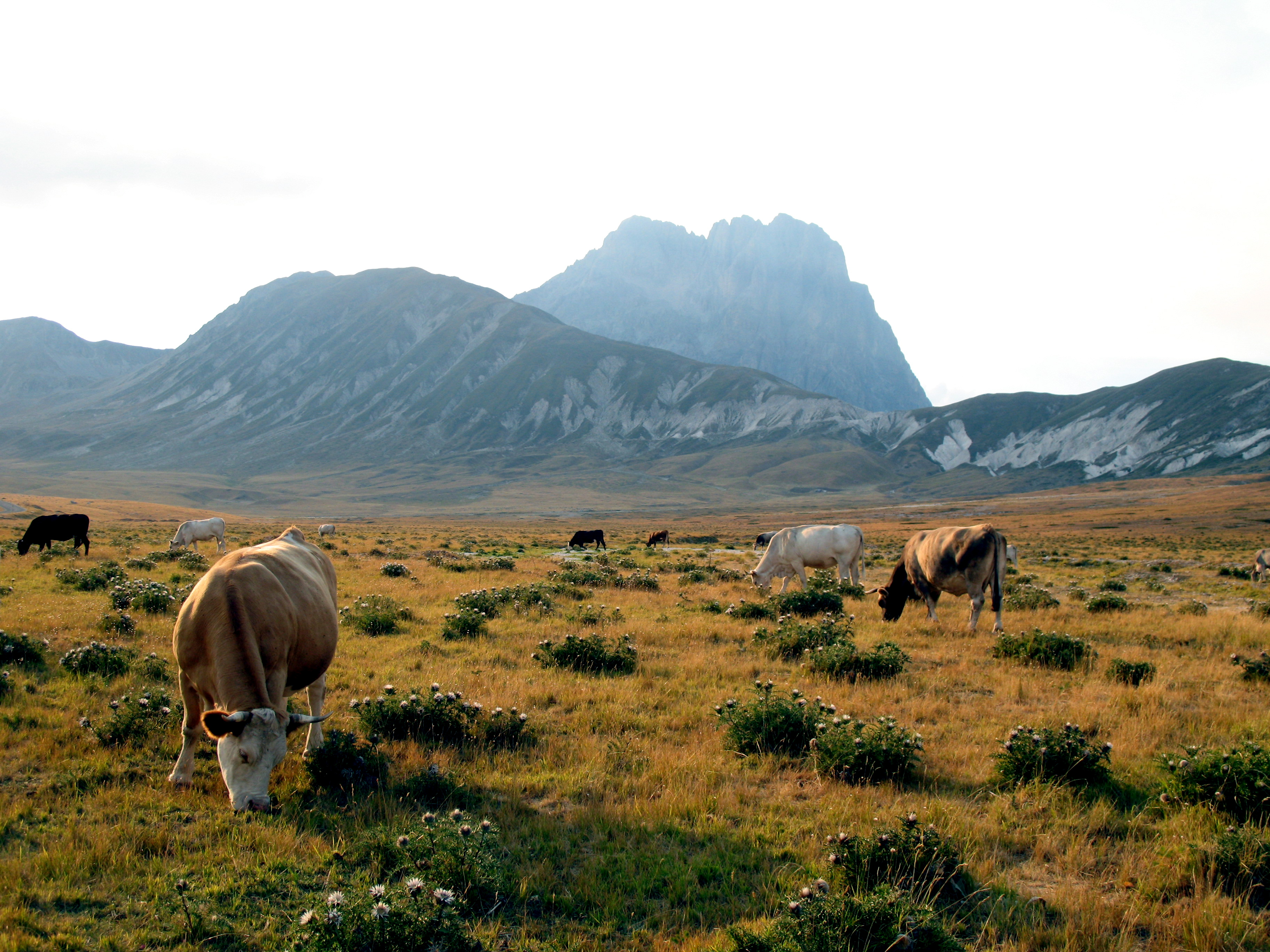
Cows graze at Campo Imperatore beneath the Corno Grande in late summer

Campo Imperatore ("Emperor's Field") is a mountain grassland or alpine meadow formed by a high basin shaped plateau located above Gran Sasso massif, the largest plateau of Apennine ridge. Known as "Little Tibet", it is located in Gran Sasso e Monti della Laga National Park, near L'Aquila, Abruzzo, Italy.

Campo Imperatore is a notable cinematographic natural set; the location has been used in more than twenty films, including The American, The Name of the Rose, Krull, Ladyhawke, Red Sonja, Il sole anche di notte, and L'Armata ritorna.

Campo Imperatore is a tectonic origin shaped by alluviums and glaciers. The plateau, which is 27 km in length and an average of 8 km in width, lies adjacent to the Apennines' highest peak Corno Grande, and Europe's southernmost glacier, the Calderone; also surrounding the plateau are Monte Prena, Monte Aquila, and the Camicia Mountains to the north and Monte Scindarella, Mesola and Monte Bolza to the south.

The plateau's altitude ranges from 1,500 to 1,900 meters. It covers an expanse of approximately 80 km^{2}. Campo Imperatore is home to one of Italy's oldest alpine ski resorts. Located on the plateau's western edge, the resort began commercial operation in the 1920s and continues to thrive as a ski resort to this day due to its proximity to Rome (132 km). The resort's hotel became dictator Benito Mussolini's prison in August 1943 with his fall from power until he was freed by German commandos on 12 September 1943. On the eastern side of the plateau is a 4 km cross country ski trail, which is maintained by the nearby town of Castel del Monte.

On the southeastern side of Campo Imperatore are medieval hill towns once ruled by the Medicis, Castel Del Monte and Santo Stefano di Sessanio as well as the ruin of one of Europe's highest fortresses, Rocca Calascio.

In spring, summer and fall, shepherds from these neighboring hill towns maintain herds of sheep, "semi-wild" horses, and cattle in the plateau. The pastures are covered with field grasses and meadowland wild flowers.

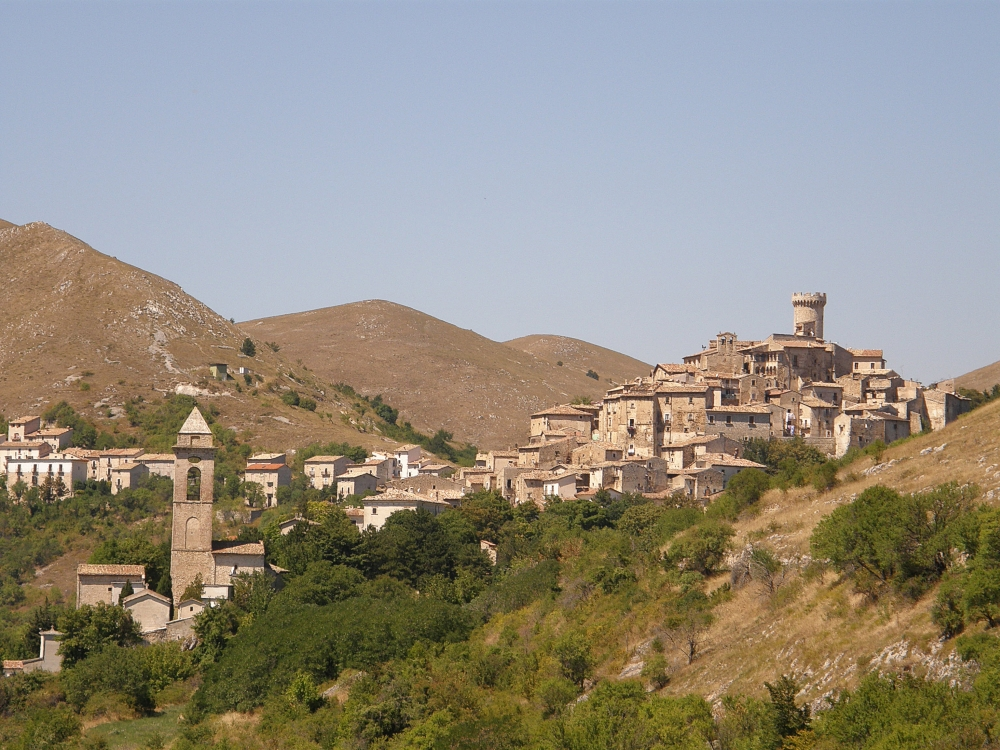
Village of Santo Stefano di Sessanio

Campo Imperatore is also home to the Alpine Botanical Garden of Campo Imperatore. Founded in 1952, the garden is devoted to cultivation and study of some 300 species indigenous mountainous plants, including rare and endangered plant species, among them Vaccinium gaultherioides, Yellow Gentiana (Gentiana lutea), Edelweiss of the Apennines (Leontopodium nivale), and Adonis distorta, all plants that have adapted to Campo Imperatore's environment.

Campo Imperatore is also the habitat for the Apennine wolf, Apennine wildcat and the Abruzzo chamois. Nearly extinct, the latter is making a comeback through a joint effort by WWF Italia and the administration of the Gran Sasso National Park. Other species of wildlife include wild boar, foxes, grass snakes, and a wide variety of bird life including golden eagles and peregrine falcons.

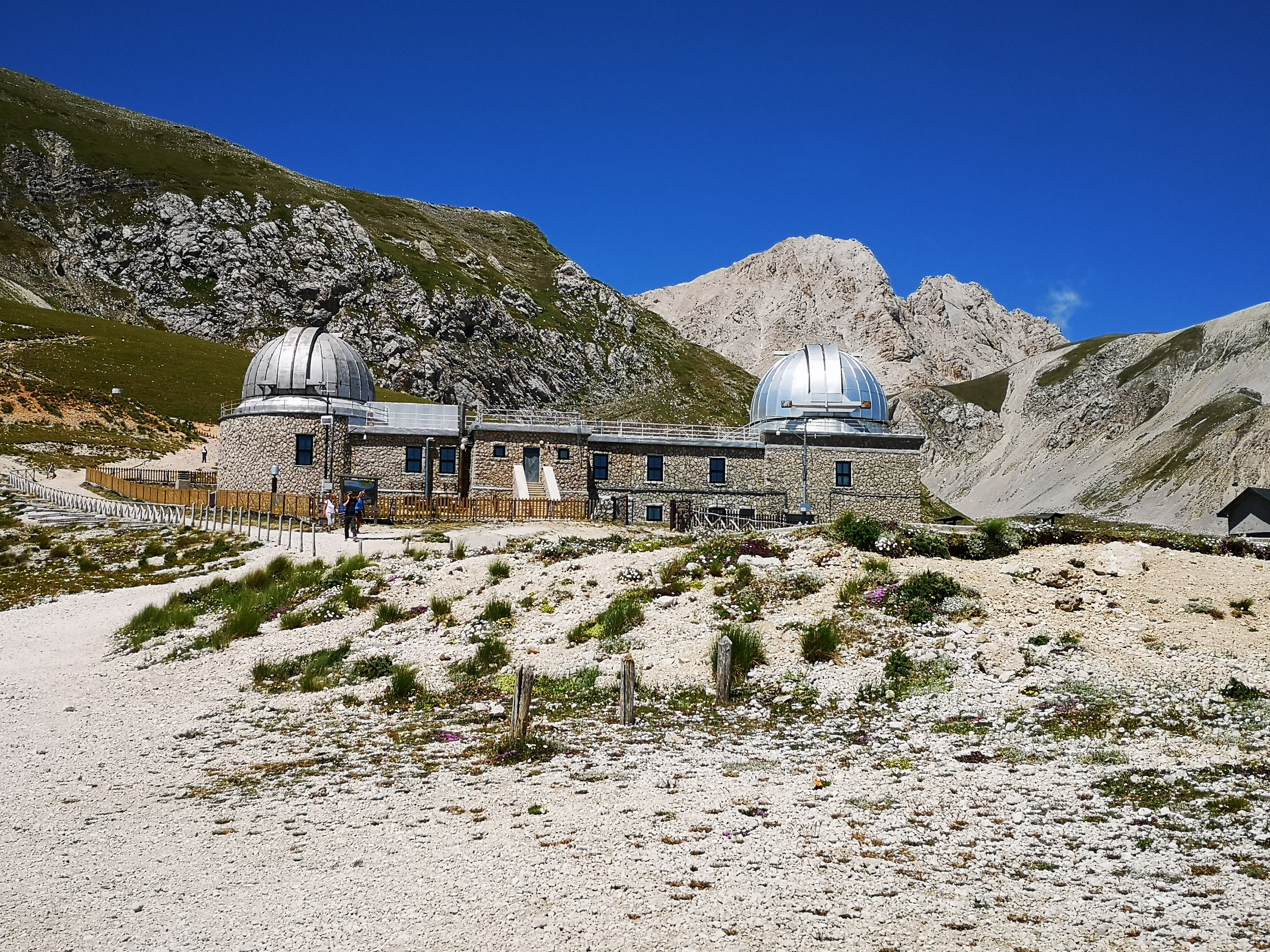
Astronomic observatory Gran Sasso from Campo Imperatore

Also located on the high plateau, taking advantage of the elevation and absence of man-made light, is the Campo Imperatore Near-Earth Object Survey (CINEOS), an observatory branch of Rome Observatory.

== See also ==
- Campo Felice
- Gran Sasso raid
- Lake Pietranzoni
