= Corno Grande =

Highest point in the Apennine Mountains

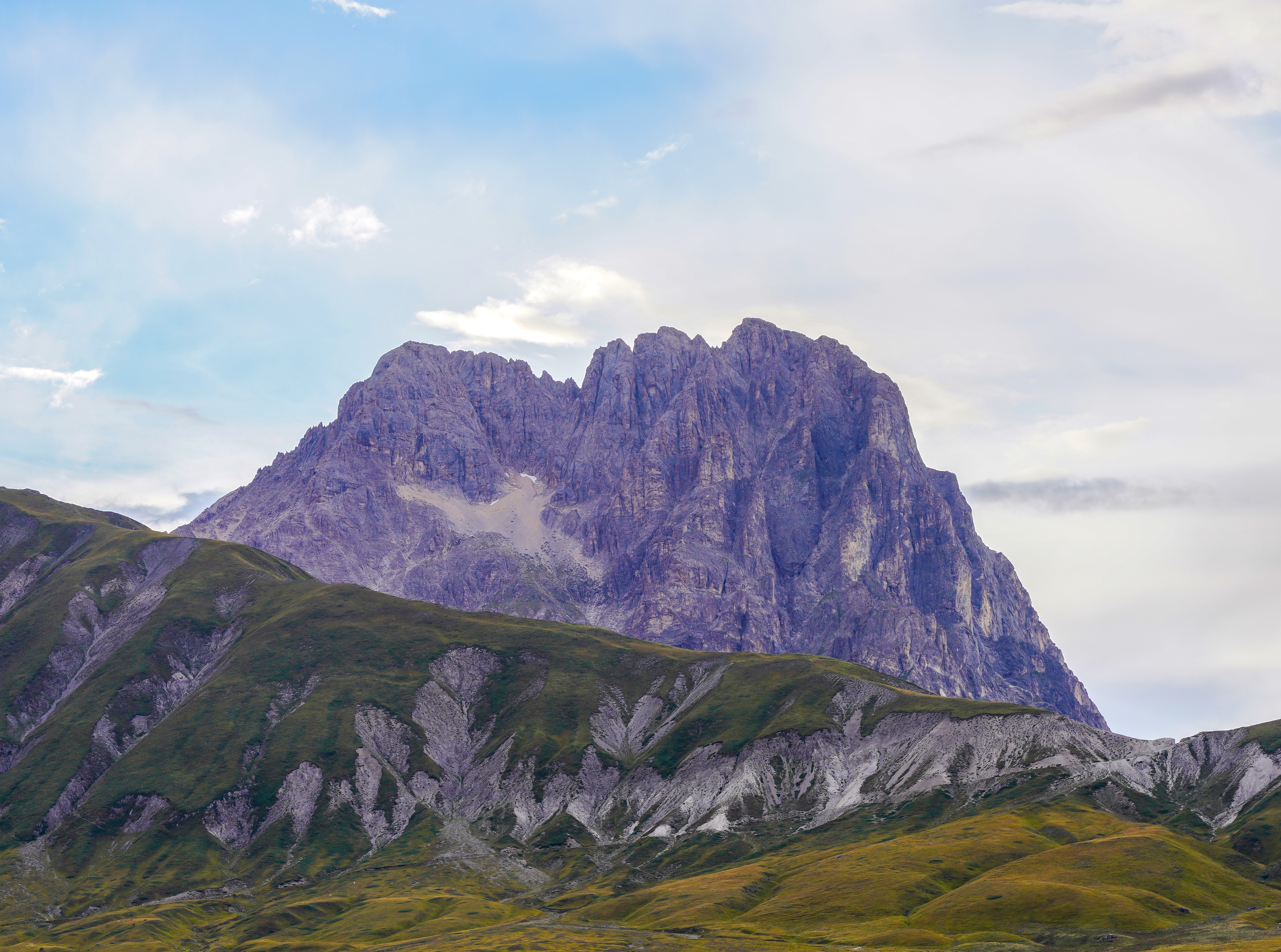
- The east face of Corno Grande

Highest point
- Elevation: 2,912 m (9,554 ft)
- Prominence: 2,477 m (8,127 ft)
- Parent peak: Monte Clapier (line parent)
- Listing: Mountains of Italy; Ultra; Ribu
- Coordinates: 42°28′09″N 13°33′56″E

Naming
- English translation: Great Horn
- Language of name: Italian

Geography
- Location within Italy
- Location: Province of Teramo, Abruzzo, Italy
- Parent range: Apennines

Climbing
- First ascent: August 19, 1573, by Francesco De Marchi
- Easiest route: Hike

Corno Grande (Italian for "great horn") is the highest point in the Apennine Mountains, situated in Abruzzo, central Italy. Part of the Gran Sasso massif, it is the highest peak of the Italian Peninsula at 2,912 metres (9,554 ft). It is the highest peak in mainland Italy outside of the Alps, and the second highest in the entire country outside the Alps, after Mount Etna in Sicily. It has significant vertical relief on the north side, though its south side is less elevated than the adjacent Campo Imperatore plateau.

The northern corrie of Corno Grande holds one of the southernmost glaciers in Europe, the Calderone glacier. The first recorded ascent of Corno Grande was made in 1573 by the Bolognese captain Francesco De Marchi alongside Francesco Di Domenico. The usual route of ascent is via the western ridge, although a number of other routes exist, including one that ascends the southern face.

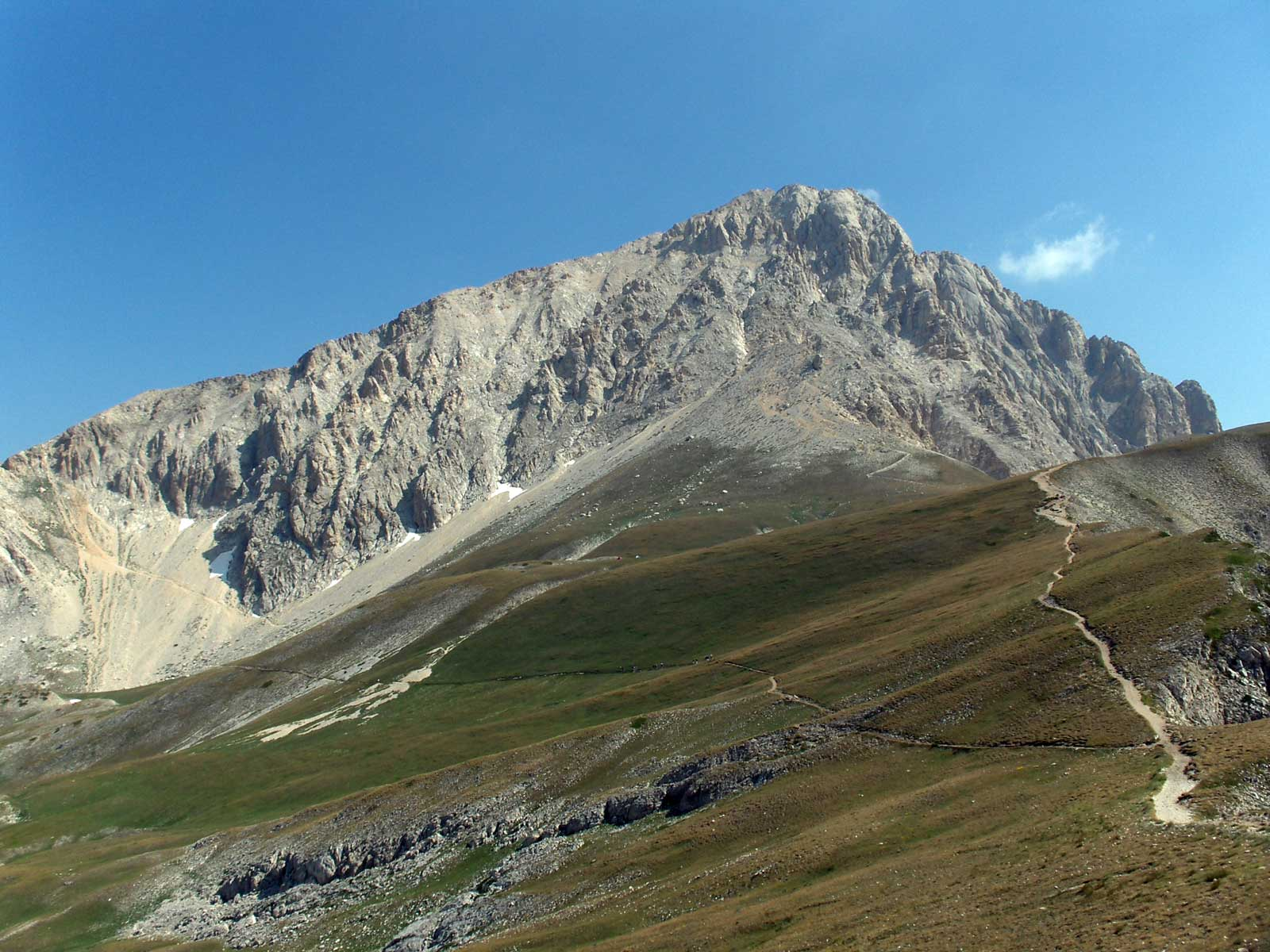
Corno Grande's peak south side

== See also ==
- List of European ultra-prominent peaks
- List of Italian regions by highest point
