= January 2017 Central Italy earthquakes =

Series of earthquakes in Central Italy

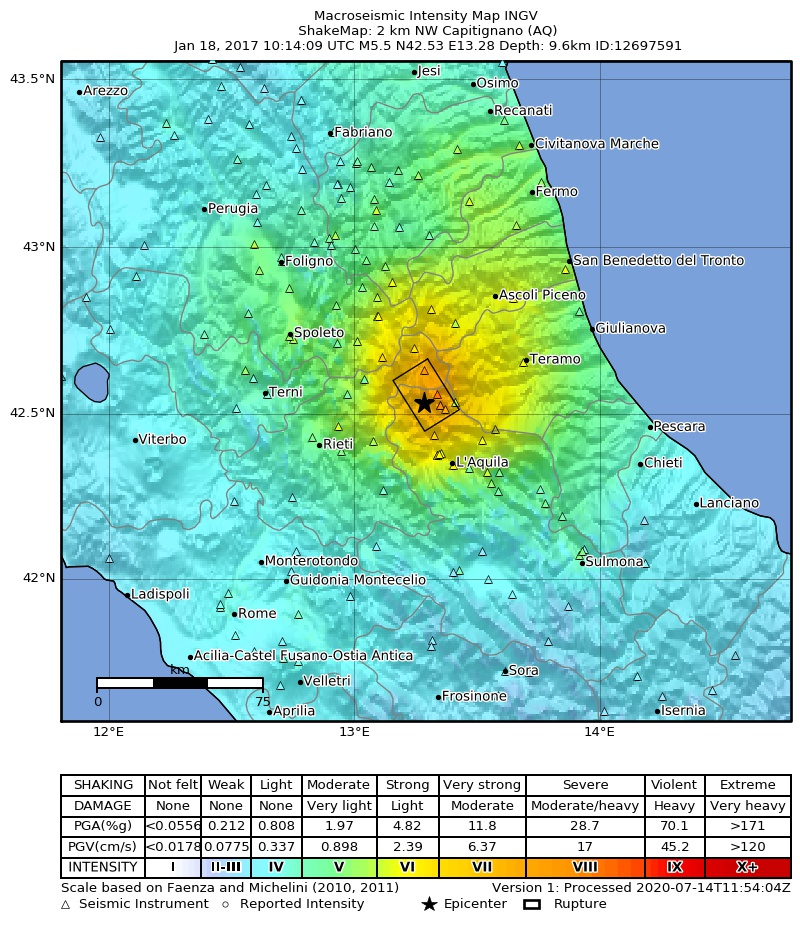
- UTC time: 2017-01-18 10:14:10
- ISC event: 611831611
- USGS-ANSS: ComCat
- Local date: 18 January 2017
- Local time: 11:14:10 (CET)
- Magnitude: 5.7 M_{w}
- Depth: 7.0 km (4.3 mi)
- Areas affected: Central Italy
- Max. intensity: EMS-98 VIII (Heavily damaging); MMI VIII (Severe)
- Casualties: 34 deaths

A series of four major earthquakes struck Central Italy between Abruzzo, Lazio, the Marche and Umbria regions on 18 January 2017.

== Earthquakes ==
A magnitude 5.3 earthquake struck 25 km northwest of L'Aquila on 18 January at 10:25 local time at a depth of 9 km. A stronger, 5.7 tremor hit the same epicentral area at 11:14 local time. A third earthquake of preliminary magnitude of 5.6 struck 11 minutes later. At 14:33 local time, the fourth tremor of magnitude 5.2 was registered. These earthquakes were followed by multiple aftershocks.

The earthquakes were strongly felt in other parts of central Italy, including the city of Rome, where the metro system and many schools were evacuated. The strongest tremor was also felt in coastal parts of Croatia (with an intensity of III). Five deaths were reported in Teramo, Crognaleto and Campotosto. These earthquakes also appeared to have triggered, in combination with a winter storm, the Rigopiano avalanche a few hours later, that struck a hotel.

=== Avalanche ===
During the evening of 18 January, the Rigopiano Hotel in the Gran Sasso mountain near Farindola in the Abruzzo region was struck by an avalanche, thought to have been triggered by the earthquakes, leaving several dead. There were forty people in the hotel when the avalanche struck, including twenty-eight guests and twelve employees Twenty-nine people were confirmed dead from the avalanche. A total of nine people were rescued, and two other people survived because they had been standing outside of the hotel when the avalanche hit. A person died in Castel Castagna.

It was reported that shortly after the earthquake hit the region, hotel guests were gathered on the ground floor of the hotel, awaiting evacuation when the avalanche struck. Upon impact, the avalanche caused part of the roof of the hotel to collapse, and moved it 10 meters (33 feet) down the mountain.

== Shocks ==

Magnitude of January 2017 earthquakes

Date / time (UTC)	Magnitude	Type	Depth Hypocenter	Epicenter		
Date / time (UTC)	Magnitude	Type	Depth Hypocenter	Location	Latitude	Longitude
2017-01-18 09:25:40	5.3	M_{w}	9.0 km	Montereale	42.55	13.26
2017-01-18 10:14:09	5.7	M_{w}	9.0 km	Capitignano	42.53	13.28
2017-01-18 10:15:33	4.7	M_{w}	10.0 km	Capitignano	42.53	13.29
2017-01-18 10:16:39	4.7	M_{w}	11.0 km	Capitignano	42.55	13.28
2017-01-18 10:25:23	5.6	M_{w}	9.0 km	Capitignano	42.49	13.31
2017-01-18 13:33:36	5.2	M_{w}	10.0 km	Cagnano Amiterno	42.48	13.28

Magnitude from August 2016 Central Italy earthquakes

== Geological aspects ==
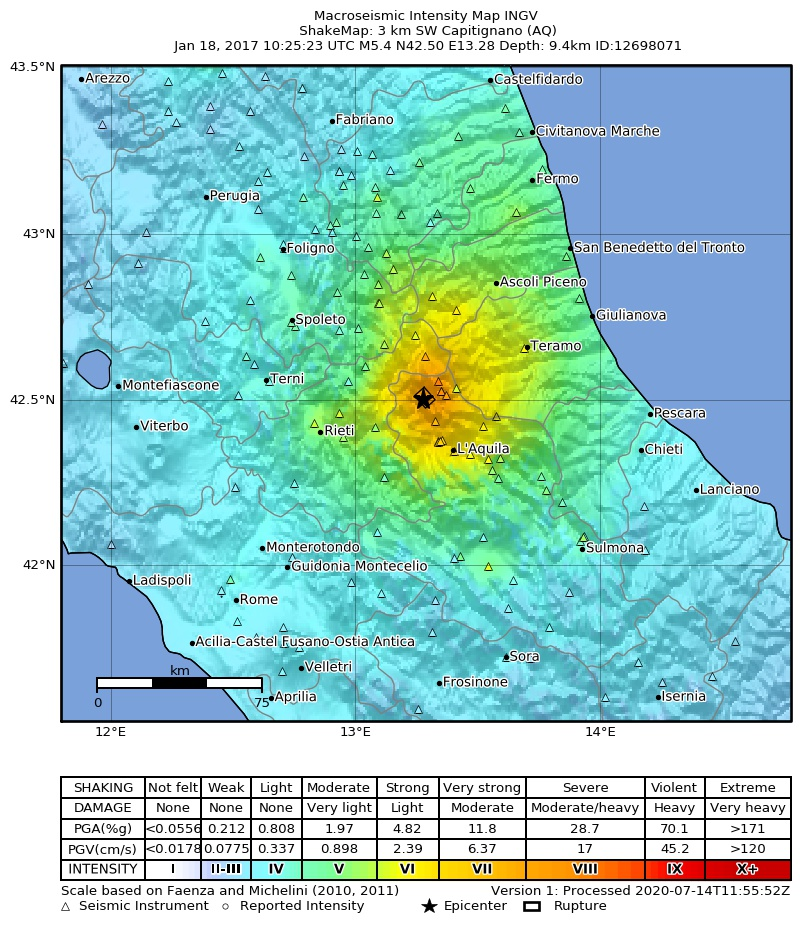
Shakemap of the strongest earthquake on 18 January 2017.

The quakes occurred in a seismic gap which is located between the areas hit by the August 2016 earthquake, the October 2016 earthquakes and the one in Umbria and Marche in 1997. In that gap, no strong earthquake happened for more than 100 years until 2016.

The rapid succession of four bursts of seismic activity in three hours, all of which with a magnitude higher than 5 was described as "a novel phenomenon in recent history" by seismologists from the National Institute of Geophysics and Volcanology of Italy. The same scientists compared it with the 1980 Irpinia earthquake, where three different quakes happened in 80 seconds.

As the process of faulting along the chain of the Apennine Mountains is a relatively recent one in geological terms, starting 500,000 years ago, the faults are more irregular, so more shaking occurs due to foreshocks according to seismologist Ross Stein from Stanford University.

== See also ==
- List of earthquakes in 2017
- List of earthquakes in Italy
- January 2017 European cold wave
- August 2016 Central Italy earthquake
- October 2016 Central Italy earthquakes
