= European cold wave =

European cold wave may refer to:

- 2006 European cold wave
- Early 2012 European cold wave
- January 2017 European cold wave
