= Capannelle Pass =

Mountain pass in Italy

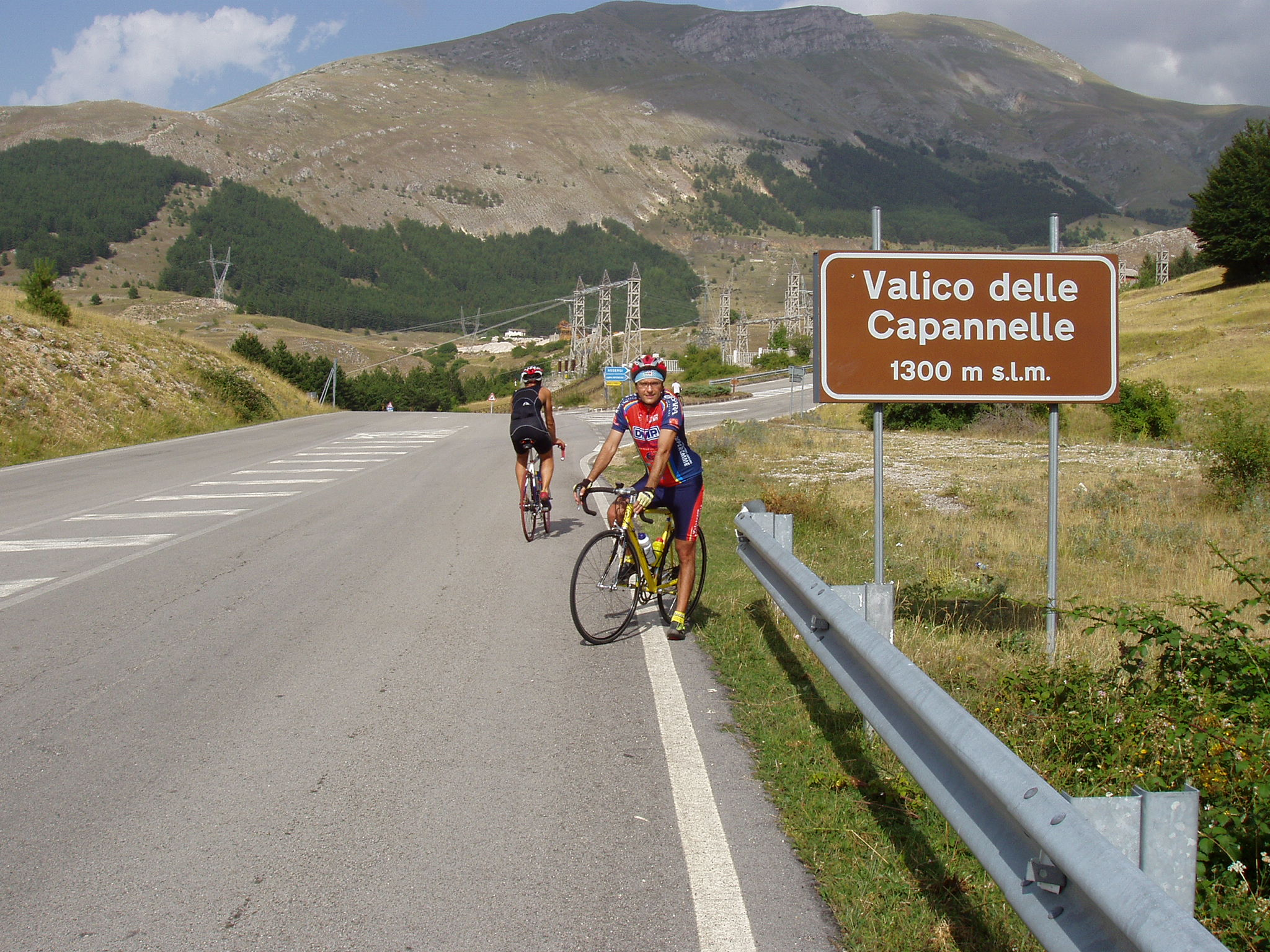
- The Capannelle Pass at an altitude of 1300 meters

- Location within Italy
- Elevation: 1,300 metres (4,300 ft)

Third Approach
- Location: Italy
- Range: Apennines
- Coordinates: 42°27′00″N 13°21′00″E

The Capannelle Pass is a mountain pass in Italy. It sits at an altitude of 1300 meters above sea level in the Province of L'Aquila in Italy's Abruzzo Region. It is located on the Italian State Highway 80 which passes near the Gran Sasso in the Apennines.

This famous pass probably takes its name from the small pastoral huts ("capannelle") which dot the landscape. They were used in times past by the local shepherds during the transumanza for protection from the elements, especially the rain and snow showers which can unexpectedly arise in the area.

The Capannelle Pass is an important transportation point linking the Province of Teramo with the Province of L'Aquila. The area is well known for hosting the Grand Highway of the Gran Sasso and Monti della Laga National Park, a touristic byway running through the heart of the national park between Montorio al Vomano ad Amiternum.

== Brigands ==
Although covered with snow in the winter and barely accessible at other times of the year, the Capanelle Pass in days past served as the only practical way to travel from one side of the Gran Sasso to the other. The pass became a favorite place for local brigands to attack hapless groups of travelers. Notorious for his bloody deeds was the infamous Giuseppe Palombieri. Palombieri was finally captured by Chiaffredo Bergia, a carabiniere (member of the Italian national police force) who had gained bragging rights for having put another brigand, Andrea Andreani, behind bars.

During the struggle to subdue Palombieri which took place near the Italian village of Campotosto shots were fired and Bergia was wounded. Bergia's persistence was rewarded, however, and he was eventually able to prevail over his erstwhile rival. Palombieri was found to be carrying a document which he had written imploring his co-conspirators to carry out a vendetta aimed at the residents and mayor of nearby Fano Adriano. In recognition of his bravery, Bergia was awarded a silver medal and promoted to the rank of brigadier.

== Visit by bicycle ==
The Capannelle Pass features gentle slopes in the direction of Teramo to the east and more difficult climbs in the direction of L'Aquila to the west. The Giro d'Italia has been staged in this area on several occasions. Nearby destinations include Lake Campotosto and Campo Imperatore.

== See also ==
- List of highest paved roads in Europe
- List of mountain passes
- Gran Sasso e Monti della Laga National Park
