= Vomano =

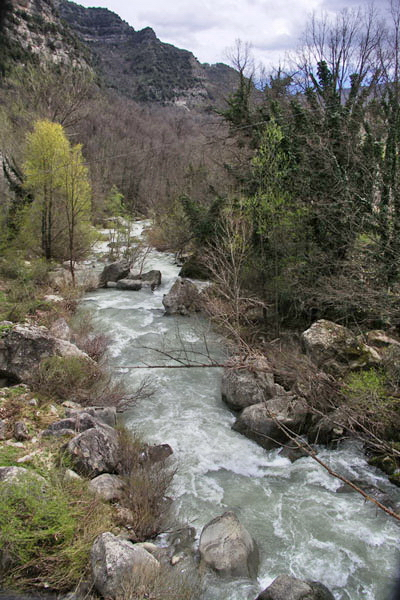

Location
- Country: Italy

Physical characteristics
- Source
  - location: Monte San Franco - Gran Sasso d'Italia
  - elevation: 2,120 m (6,960 ft)
- Mouth: Adriatic Sea
  - location: near Roseto degli Abruzzi
  - coordinates: 42.6550°N 14.0379°E
- Length: 76 km (47 mi)
- Basin size: 764 km^{2} (295 sq mi)

The Vomano (Latin: Vomanus) is a 76-km river that flows through the Abruzzo region of central Italy. Its source is near Monte San Franco in Gran Sasso d'Italia and Lago di Campotosto in the province of L'Aquila. The river crosses the border into the province of Teramo and flows northeast near Montorio al Vomano and Basciano. The Fucino flows into the Vomano south of Crognaleto and the Mavone flows into the Vomano near Basciano. It enters the Adriatic Sea near Roseto degli Abruzzi.
