= Piane di Collevecchio =

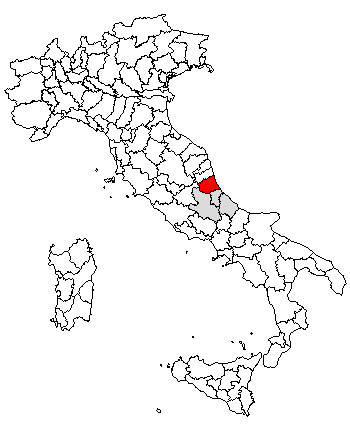
Location of the province of Teramo

Piane di Collevecchio (Plain of Collevecchio) is a frazione of the Italian comune of Montorio al Vomano. It lies in the Province of Teramo in the Abruzzo region. In 2011, 2.7% of the families in Montorio al Vomano lived in Piane di Collevecchio.

== History ==
The village of Collevecchio probably grew up on the piane before moving to its current hilltop location.

Around 1927 a small church was constructed in the name of Saint Emygdius, under the supervision of architect Pio Ferretti. His brother Gregorio later served as priest in the church. In spite of this, in 1945 Gregorio was shot by local partisans for his support of the Fascists.

Located in Piane di Collevecchio is an old water mill constructed in 1867 by Angelo Giuseppe and Francesco Salvi. Various members of the Salvi family kept the mill in operation until the year 1962. Today it is used mostly for school visits and educational purposes.

== Economy ==
In 1989 springs containing salt and sulphurous waters were uncovered in this area. These thermal baths have received recognition from the local Italian Ministry and a large tourist centre devoted to their enjoyment has been planned. Such a development should bring much needed economic development to the surrounding area.

== Monastery ==
At one time the ancient Monastery of Santa Maria was located in a deep hollow known as "Fosso dello Zolfo" (Sulphur Ditch). It must have been constructed on a very steep incline near the Vomano river. A neighborhood in this locality is still known as Santa Maria, referred to by others as San Martino. Over time the forces of erosion have washed away virtually all traces of this small church although some of the elderly residents of Piane di Collevecchio still speak of its presence. From time to time people who happen to be excavating in the area come across traces of the church, these thought to be omens of good luck.

== Festivals and events ==
One prominent tradition in this hamlet is linked to memory of Saint Anthony. Groups of young people dress in the historical costumes and go from house to house singing traditional songs. In return, local food delicacies such as sausage, cheese, and eggs are requested.

Another custom involves a game called rutula (the dialect word for ruzzola, meaning to roll). Spheres of wood or rubber (in the past cheese) are placed in the pouch of a sheppard's sling and hurled far through the air. Tournaments dedicated to this pastime are still held and an Italian rutula champion was recently crowned.
