= Lake Campotosto =

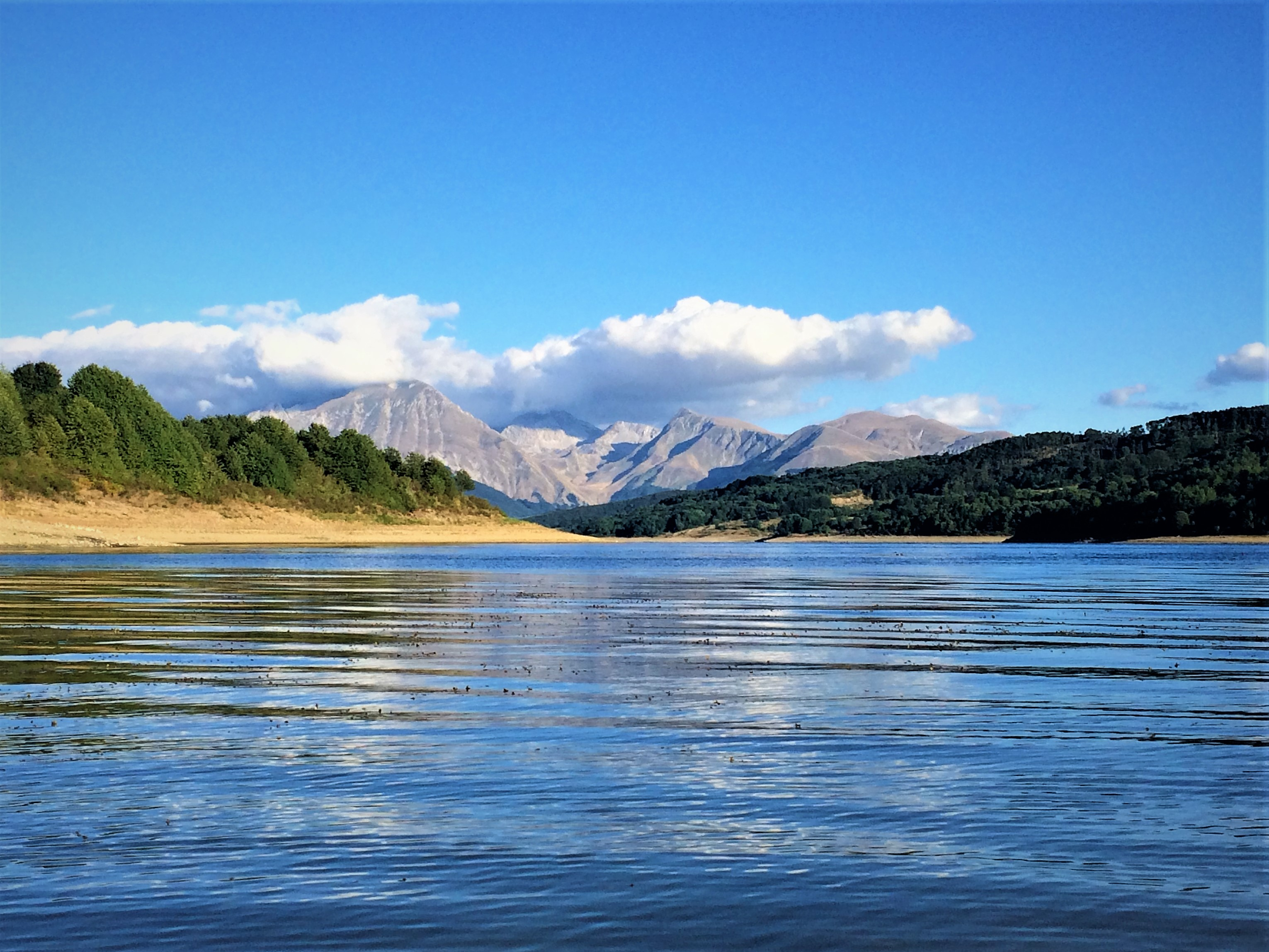

- Location within Abruzzo
- Location: Abruzzo
- Coordinates: 42°31′51″N 13°23′00″E
- Type: reservoir
- Primary inflows: Fucino
- Primary outflows: Fucino
- Catchment area: 47.5 km^{2} (18.3 sq mi)
- Basin countries: Italy
- Surface area: 14 km^{2} (5.4 sq mi)
- Max. depth: 38 m (125 ft)
- Water volume: 230 million cubic metres (190,000 acre⋅ft)
- Surface elevation: 1,313 m (4,308 ft)

Lago di Campotosto ("Toughfield Lake") is an artificial lake in Abruzzo, Italy. The reservoir is located at an elevation of 1,313 m and comprises an area of 14 square kilometres. It is located in the natural park known as the "Gran Sasso e Monti della Laga National Park".

The lake is reachable via the Italian State Highway 80 from either L'Aquila or the Adriatic Coast. Smaller roads lead to Capitignano, Montereale and Amatrice.

== Description ==
During the Quaternary Period of glacier formation, the Campotosto water basin had the form of a double "Y". Towards the end of this period, the Fucino River bed came into being. The upper portion of the artificial lake maintains the previously seen double "Y" formation that on the lower side is shaped more like a single "V".

The area where the lake now sits was once a vast peat bog, this used as an energy source by the local small industries up until the early 20th century. Lake Campotosto was created in the 1930s by means of constructing three dikes. The main reason for creating the lake was to establish a water reservoir that could be used to generate hydroelectric power in the Vomano valley.

During the construction of Lake Campotosto, a cableway leading to the Capitignano railway station was fortified. It was used to transport building materials and to carry earth away from the excavations. From Capitignano the rail line headed to L'Aquila following a course that had earlier been used for the transportation of peat. The rail line was abandoned soon after construction of the lake was completed.

During the winter the lake freezes completely over while in the fall many people come for a visit to admire the colorful foliage in the nearby forests.

== Flora and fauna ==
The Lake Campotosto Reserve, located in the Province of L'Aquila in Abruzzo is a state owned wildlife preservation area. Local species include beech, willow, and snakewood trees. Indigenous to the area are badgers, pheasants, and foxes.

== Lakeside attractions ==
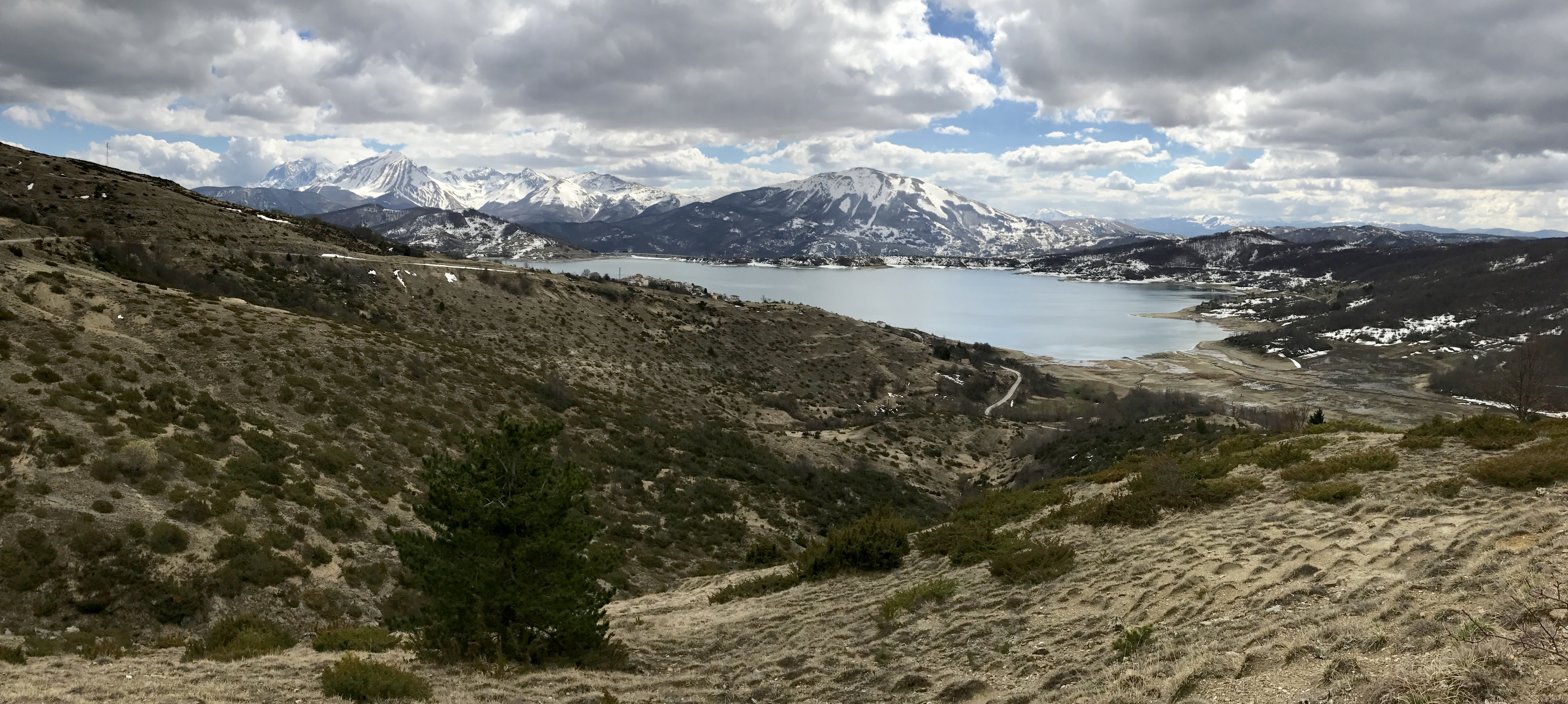
Lake Campotosto is surrounded by mountains.

A circular trail about 50 km in length run along the perimeter of Lake Campotosto. It is rather flat in nature. In the summer it serves as a gathering place for many hiking, jogging, bicycle touring or simple romantic walks during the sunset hours. Shorter excursions can be arranged by cutting off one of the two main branches of the lake. A bridge, Ponte delle Stecche ("The Bridge of Sticks") has been built in one of the narrower sections of the lake. An older unused structure stands nearby. The traveler using this bridge is also able to greatly shorten his lakeside.

The neighboring Capannelle Pass, is located about 15 km away and also attracts many cyclists and motorbikers in the warmer months of the year.

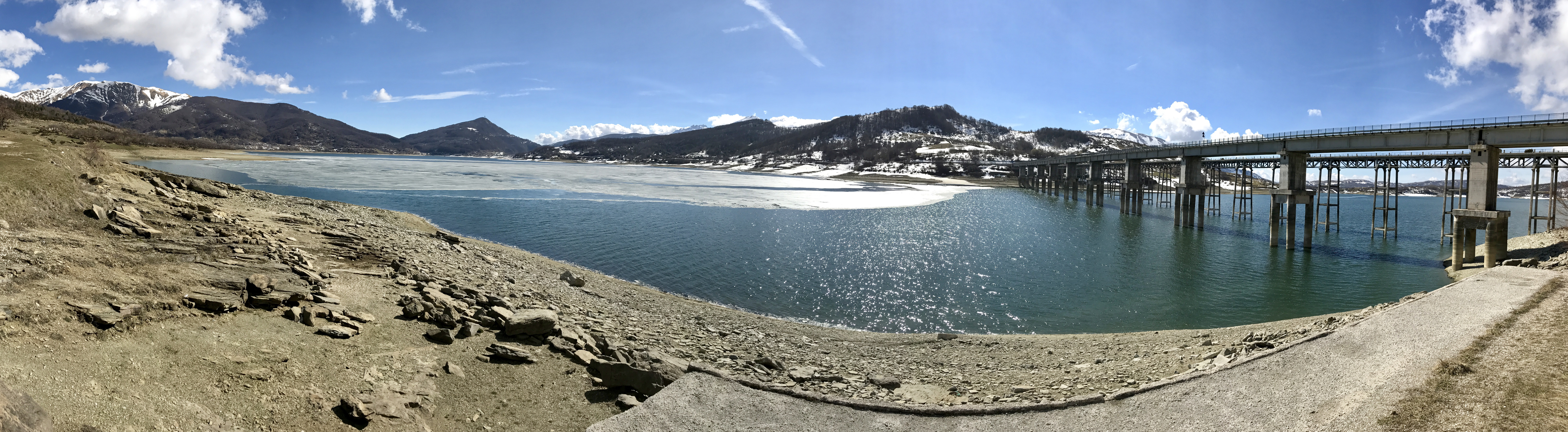
Panoramic view from Lake Campotosto.

== Bordering towns ==
- Campotosto
- Mascioni
- Poggio Cancelli
