= Ponzano di Civitella del Tronto =

Coordinates: 42°46′44″N 13°42′20″E

- Frazione
- Interactive map of Ponzano di Civitella del Tronto
- Country: Italy
- Region: Abruzzo
- Province: Teramo
- Time zone: UTC+1 (CET)
  - Summer (DST): UTC+2 (CEST)

Ponzano di Civitella del Tronto is a frazione in the Province of Teramo in the Abruzzo region of Italy. The January 2017 Central Italy earthquakes aftershocks, resulting in landslides, caused considerable damage to the village.
