= Odorico =

Odorico is a masculine given name borne by:

- Odorico or Odoric of Pordenone (c. 1280–1331), Italian Franciscan friar and missionary explorer
- Odorico D'Andrea (1916–1990), Italo-Nicaraguan Catholic priest, co-founder of the Franciscan Sisters Pilgrims of the Immaculate Heart of Mary and missionary
- Odorico Politi (1785–1846), Italian painter
- Odorico Raynaldi (1594–1671), Italian historian
- Odorico Leovigildo Saiz Pérez (1912–2012), Spanish Catholic bishop
