= Montereale =

Montereale may refer to the following Italian comuni:

- Montereale, Abruzzo, in the Province of L'Aquila
- Montereale Valcellina, in the Province of Pordenone
