= Mavone =

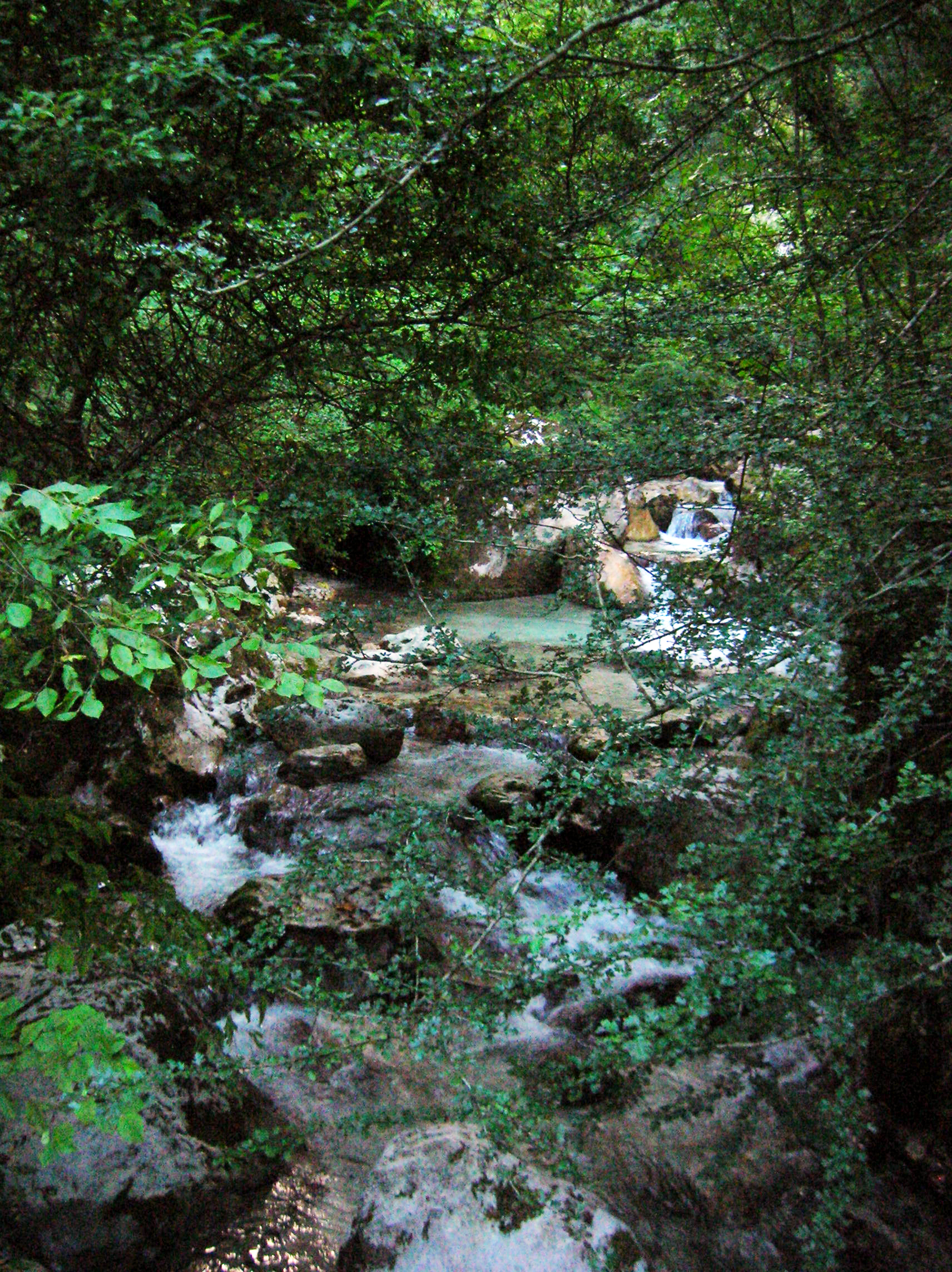
- The Mavone flowing near Isola del Gran Sasso d'Italia

Location
- Country: Italy

Physical characteristics
- Source
  - location: Gran Sasso e Monti della Laga National Park
- Mouth: Vomano
  - coordinates: 42.6084°N 13.7137°E

Basin features
- Progression: Vomano→ Adriatic Sea

The Mavone is a river in Italy. It is located in the province of Teramo in the Abruzzo region of southern Italy. The river is the main tributary of the Vomano. Its source is in the Gran Sasso e Monti della Laga National Park near Corno Grande. The river flows northeast near Isola del Gran Sasso d'Italia and Colledara before joining the Vomano near Basciano.
