= Campotosto =

- Comune
- Comune di Campotosto
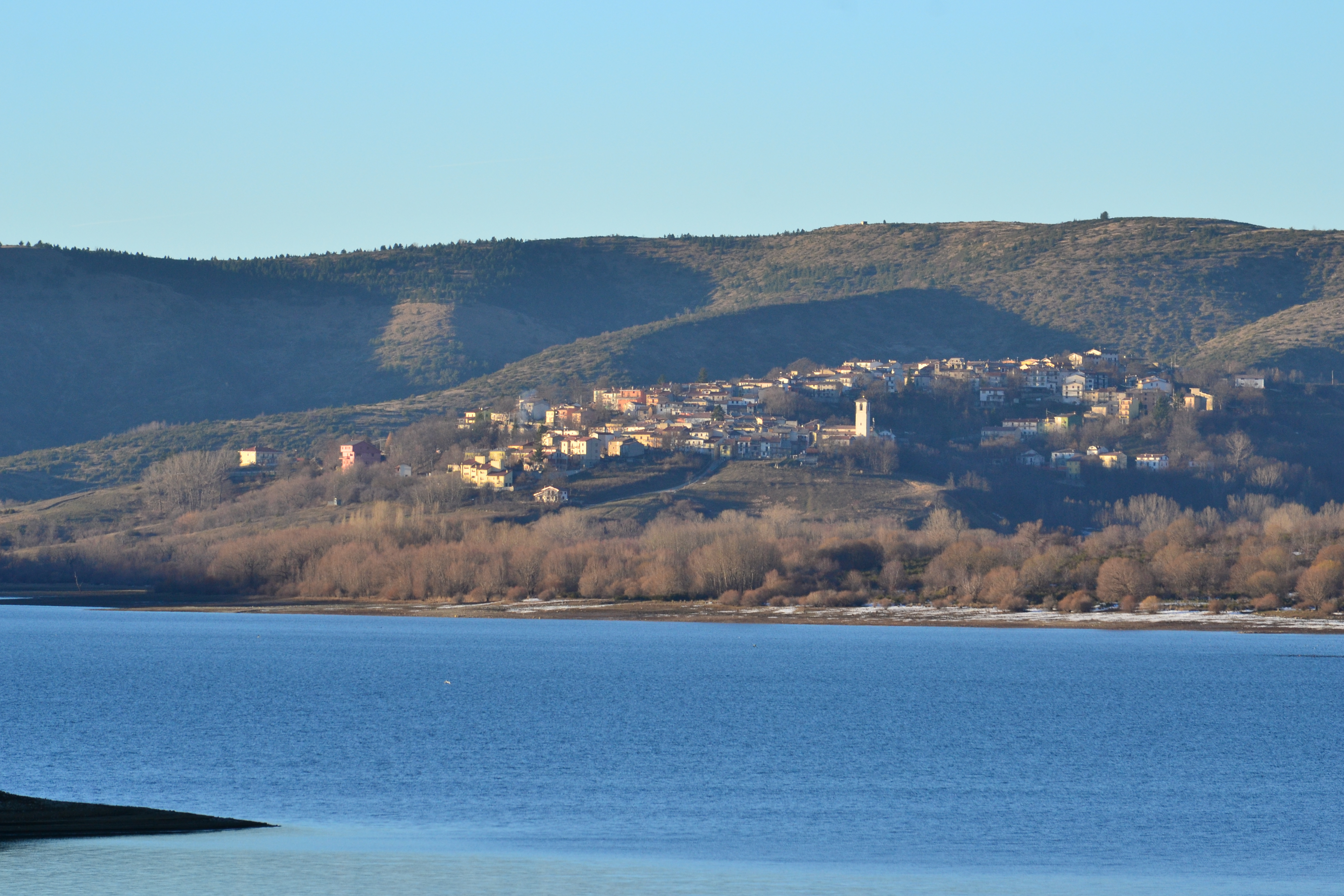

- Location within Italy Location within Abruzzo
- Coordinates: 42°33′35″N 13°22′8″E
- Country: Italy
- Region: Abruzzo
- Province: L'Aquila (AQ)
- Frazioni: Mascioni, Ortolano, Poggio Cancelli, Rio Fucino, San Pelino, San Potito

Government
  - Mayor: Antonio Di Carlantonio

Area
  - Total: 51.74 km^{2} (19.98 sq mi)
- Elevation: 1,420 m (4,660 ft)

Population (2013)
  - Total: 580
  - Density: 11/km^{2} (29/sq mi)
- Demonym: Campotostari
- Time zone: UTC+1 (CET)
  - Summer (DST): UTC+2 (CEST)
- Postal code: 67103
- Dialing code: 0862
- Patron saint: Maria Santissima della Visitazione
- Saint day: July 2
- Website: Official website

Campotosto (Sabino: Camputotsu) is a comune and town in the province of L'Aquila, in the Abruzzo region of central Italy. Olympian Mariano Antonelli was born here.

== Geography ==
Campotosto is located in the northern part of the province of L'Aquila, south of the border with Lazio, and west of the province of Teramo. It is located in Gran Sasso e Monti della Laga National Park. The town has become famous in Italy for its lake, which is the biggest Italian man-made lake.

=== Accessibility ===
The town is served by Italian State Highway 80, a trunk road that connects L'Aquila with Giulianova (TE). There are also secondary roads that connect Campotosto with Amatrice, Montereale, Aringo and Capitignano.

=== Climate ===
The town has a typical Alpine climate, partially mitigated by the nearby lake.

Climate data for Campotosto (1991-2020)
Month	Jan	Feb	Mar	Apr	May	Jun	Jul	Aug	Sep	Oct	Nov	Dec	Year
Mean daily maximum °C (°F)	4.2 (39.6)	4.7 (40.5)	7.7 (45.9)	11.5 (52.7)	15.9 (60.6)	20.7 (69.3)	23.8 (74.8)	24.3 (75.7)	18.8 (65.8)	15.3 (59.5)	9.9 (49.8)	5.5 (41.9)	13.5 (56.3)
Mean daily minimum °C (°F)	−3.1 (26.4)	−3.4 (25.9)	−1.0 (30.2)	2.2 (36.0)	6.0 (42.8)	9.9 (49.8)	12.0 (53.6)	12.4 (54.3)	8.6 (47.5)	5.9 (42.6)	2.3 (36.1)	−1.5 (29.3)	4.2 (39.5)

=== Cuisine ===
The town is famous for the production of Mortadella di Campotosto.
