= Ville di Fano =

Coordinates: 42°31′51″N 13°11′44″E

- Frazione
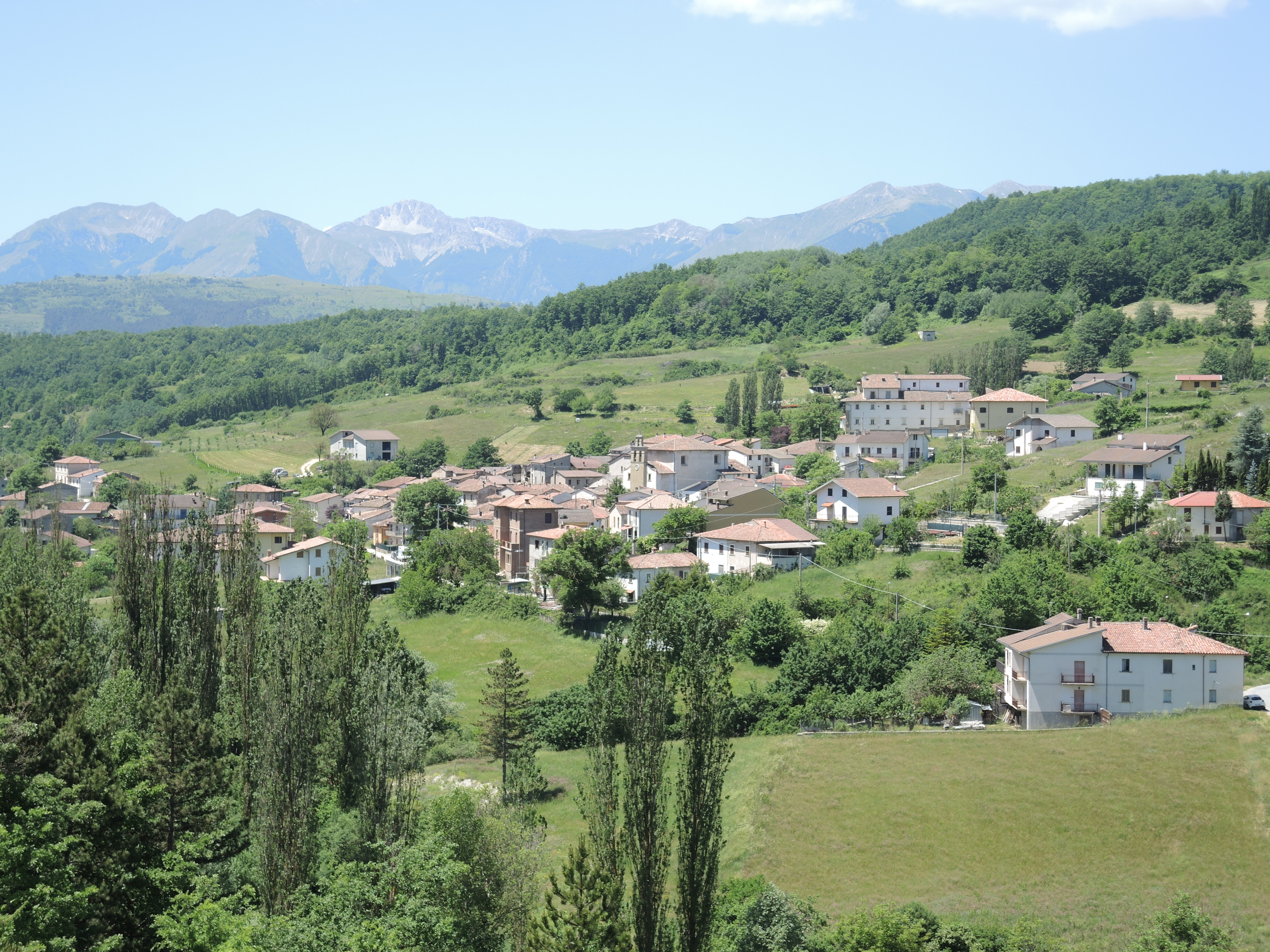
- Interactive map of Ville di Fano
- Country: Italy
- Region: Abruzzo
- Province: L'Aquila
- Commune: Montereale
- Time zone: UTC+1 (CET)
  - Summer (DST): UTC+2 (CEST)

Pellescritta is a frazione of Montereale, in the Province of L'Aquila in the Abruzzo, region of Italy.
