= Castel Paganica =

- Frazione
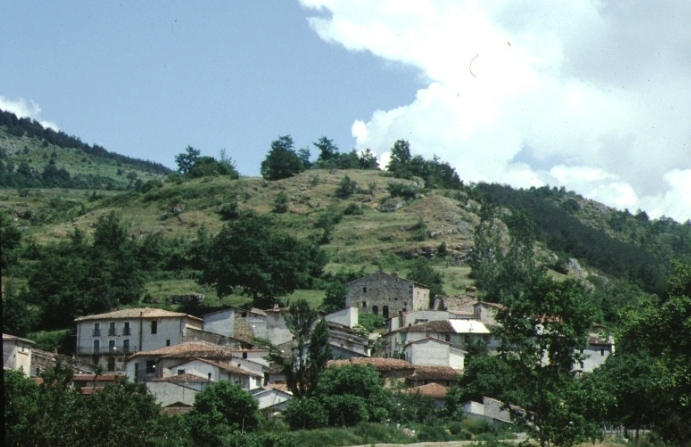
- Interactive map of Castel Paganica
- Country: Italy
- Region: Abruzzo
- Province: L'Aquila
- Commune: Montereale
- Time zone: UTC+1 (CET)
  - Summer (DST): UTC+2 (CEST)

Castel Paganica is a frazione of Montereale, in the Province of L'Aquila in the Abruzzo, region of Italy. It is located inside the Gran Sasso e Monti della Laga National Park.
