= Pellescritta =

Coordinates: 42°30′30″N 13°12′19″E

- Frazione
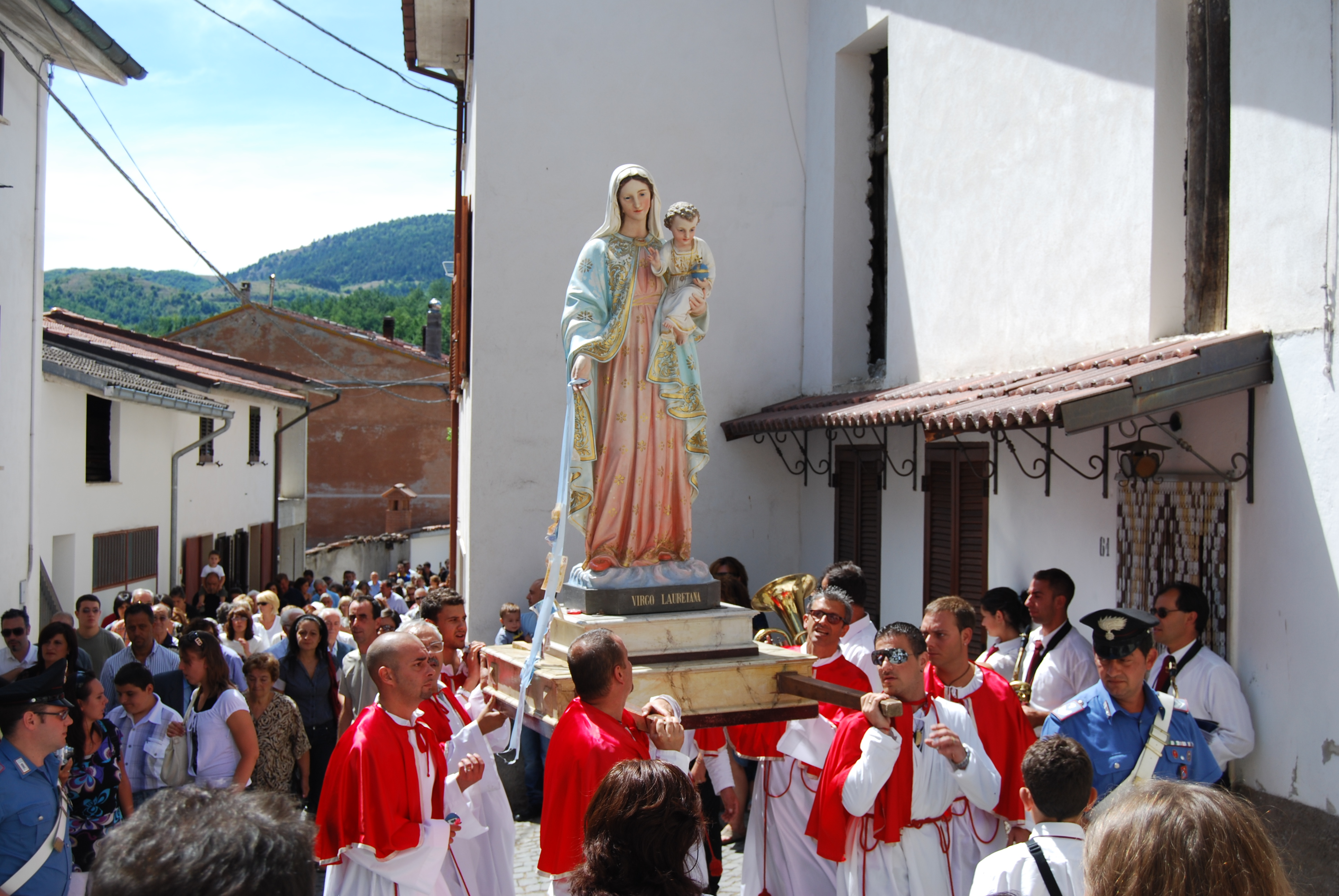
- Procession in Pellescritta
- Interactive map of Pellescritta
- Country: Italy
- Region: Abruzzo
- Province: L'Aquila
- Commune: Montereale
- Time zone: UTC+1 (CET)
  - Summer (DST): UTC+2 (CEST)

Pellescritta is a frazione of Montereale, in the Province of L'Aquila in the Abruzzo region of Italy.

The local church is dedicated to St. Nicholas, whose annual festival includes a procession.

Due to its topography, the village is at risk from damage caused by an earthquake.

The village is remote and is not directly accessible by public transportation; one must take a bus from L'Aquila, through Marana di Montereale, and then drive or hike.
