= Rigopiano avalanche =

2017 disaster in Italy

- Date: 18 January 2017
- Time: 16:48 local time
- Location: Rigopiano, Abruzzo, Italy; 42°25′52″N 13°46′58″E
- Cause: Earthquakes and/or heavy snowfall
- Participants: 40 (28 guests, 12 employees)
- Deaths: 29
- Injuries: 11
- Survivors: 11

On the afternoon of 18 January 2017, an avalanche occurred on Gran Sasso d'Italia massif, one of the mountains above Rigopiano, impacting and destroying the four-star Hotel Rigopiano in Farindola, Abruzzo. The disaster killed 29 people and injured 11 others, making it the deadliest avalanche in Italy since the White Friday avalanches in 1916, and the deadliest in Europe since the Galtür avalanche in 1999.

Two factors which contributed to the disaster were a series of earthquakes that struck the region earlier in the day, and record snowfall which occurred in the region over the preceding days.

== Avalanche ==
It was reported that shortly after a series of earthquakes hit the region, many guests of the four-star Hotel Rigopiano were gathered on the ground floor awaiting evacuation when the avalanche struck at 16:48 local time on 18 January. At the time, there were forty people in the hotel including twenty-eight guests and twelve employees. Upon impact, the avalanche caused part of the roof of the hotel to collapse, and moved it 10 metres (33 ft) down the mountain. Italian authorities estimated that the avalanche contained between 40,000 and 60,000 tonnes of snow when it hit the hotel. Upon impact to the hotel the speed was around 100 km/h (62 mph).

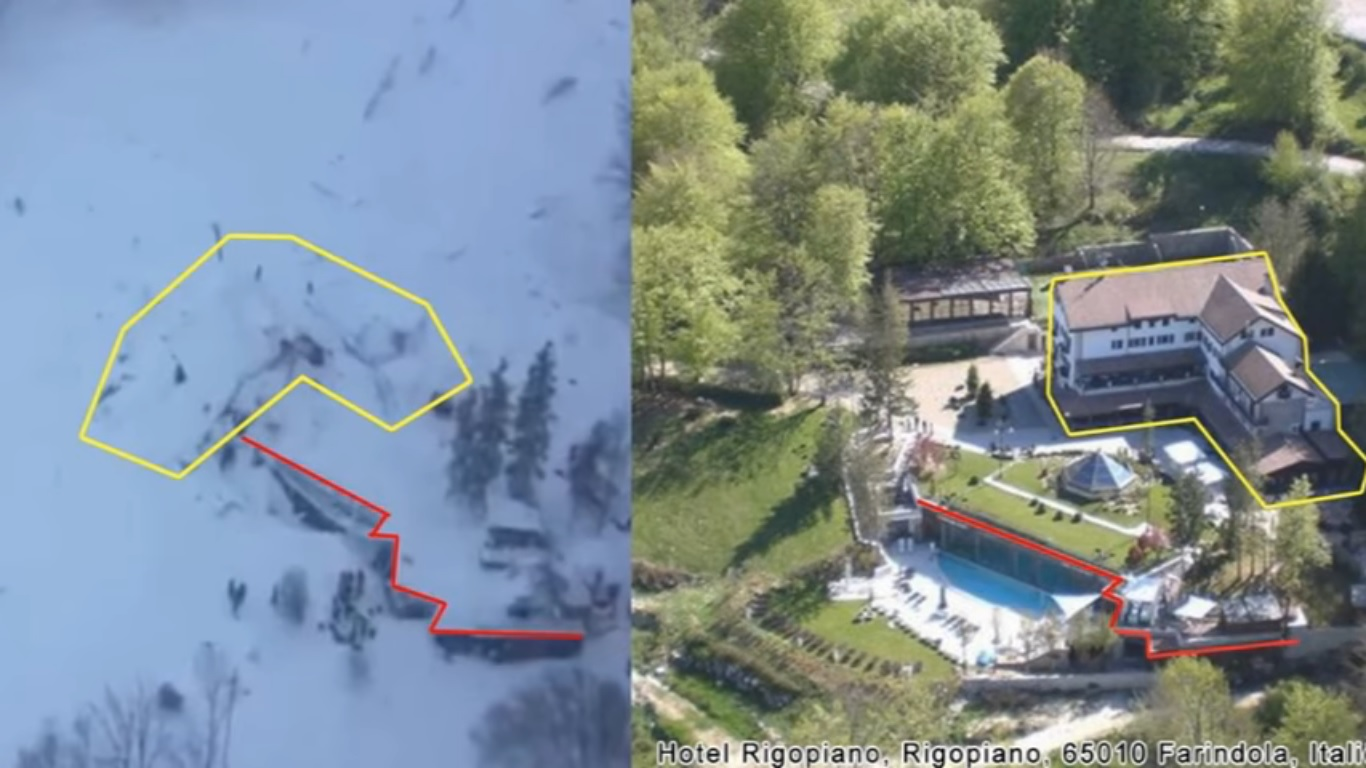
Rigopiano Hotel after and before the avalanche

The avalanche largely destroyed the hotel, killing 29 people. Eleven people were rescued following the avalanche, including two who survived the avalanche because they were standing outside when it hit. The survivors trapped inside the hotel, sheltered by lofts that had not collapsed, were located around 12:00 on 20 January, over 30 hours after the avalanche.

Five adults and four children trapped below the ruins and the snow were rescued, the last ones after 58 hours, having survived on frozen snow. Ten out of the eleven people rescued received minor injuries related to hypothermia. The eleventh person also received a compression injury to his upper arm, which he underwent surgery for. On 23 January, rescuers recovered a twelfth body, but also located three puppies alive under the snow, indicating that the 22 people missing may have still been alive. However, it was later revealed that no one else had survived the avalanche. One of the victims, as reported from a text message in her smartphone, survived for more than 40 hours.

== Response ==
Due to harsh conditions that inhibited helicopters from flying, first responders had difficulty reaching the hotel. Large amounts of snow had fallen for several days prior to the accident, and fallen trees and rubble on the streets delayed the clearing of snow, so that the first rescuers arrived at the scene on skis at 04:30 on 19 January. They reported that the hotel had been buried under at least four metres (13 ft) of snow, and that it could take days before they would know if there were any survivors. The rescue workers' base camp with ambulances was set up approximately 10 km (6 mi) away. Individuals from emergency services, civil protection, alpine rescue and volunteers including asylum seekers worked with technology to track body heat, phone signals and other data, and drones to locate victims.

After two days, emergency personnel made contact with six survivors in an air pocket of the destroyed hotel and managed to rescue them. Five days after the avalanche, three puppies from the hotel's resident dogs were found and rescued by workers, and reunited with their parents, Lupo (Wolf) and Nuvola (Cloud) who had escaped and found shelter in the nearby village of Farindola. The puppies were regarded as a sign of hope, but officials warned that their survival did not mean that more human survivors would be found.

There was criticism over the time it took emergency services to respond to the accident. A survivor who had remained outside the hotel following the avalanche phoned for help, but alleged that the authorities did not at first believe that the accident had happened. Quintino Marcella, the owner of a restaurant in Silvi, received a call from the survivor and attempted to contact authorities on numerous occasions but said that he was not taken seriously. On 23 January, local newspapers reported that prior to the avalanche, the owner of the hotel sent an email to local authorities expressing his concern for the hotel guests because they were panicking after the earthquakes. He had said that many were planning on spending the night outside the hotel in their cars.

== Legal ==
On 22 January, the mayor of Farindola, Ilario Lacchetta, announced that he was planning on filing a lawsuit against the satirical magazine Charlie Hebdo for publishing a cartoon allegedly mocking victims of the disaster. The cartoon depicts Death riding the avalanche down the mountain on skis holding two scythes instead of ski poles. Lacchetta stated that the cartoon "goes beyond bad taste" and was just as offensive as a similar satirical cartoon published by the same company which mocked victims of the Amatrice earthquake in August 2016.

Prosecutors launched a manslaughter investigation of the failure of authorities to respond for many hours to reports of an avalanche. In addition, an investigation was launched to determine whether Hotel Rigopiano was built on the debris of previous avalanches which had taken a similar route down the mountain, therefore putting the hotel in danger.

On 31 January, Italian judges announced that autopsies revealed that almost all of the victims died immediately from the impact of the avalanche itself, rather than succumbing to hypothermia in the days following the disaster.

A trial of officials, emergency responders and hotel management began in 2019 and concluded in February 2023. Five people were found guilty, including the former manager of the hotel and an engineer who had approved the hotel's balconies and canopies. The mayor of Farindola was found guilty of failing to order the evacuation of the hotel and received the longest sentence, two years and eight months in prison. There was insufficient evidence to establish his guilt on 25 other charges. The former prefect of Pescara and the former provincial president were found not guilty. Victims' relatives protested the verdicts in the courtroom.

== Memorials ==
A year after the incident, on 18 January 2018, a day of remembrance was held during which victims' relatives, local residents and representatives of the authorities and emergency services read prayers and poems and laid flowers outside the ruins of the hotel. There was also a display of photos of those killed, with the words "Never Again".

Two survivors wrote a book about their family's experience titled Il Peso della neve ('The Weight of the Snow').

== See also ==
- List of avalanches by death toll
- 2009 Schalfkogel avalanche, the deadliest avalanche in Austria since 2000
- 2016 Geier avalanche, a deadly avalanche which struck Austria one year prior
- January 2017 European cold wave, a cold wave which is associated with record cold temperatures and snowfall which precipitated the avalanche
- Valfréjus avalanche, a deadly avalanche which struck France one year prior
- Winter of Terror, a series of deadly avalanches in Austria during the winter of 1950-51
