= Fucino (river) =

River in Italy

Location
- Country: Italy

Physical characteristics
- Mouth: Vomano
  - coordinates: 42.5536°N 13.4790°E

Basin features
- Progression: Vomano→ Adriatic Sea

The Fucino is a river in Italy. It is located in the province of Teramo in the Abruzzo region of southern Italy. The river is a tributary of the Vomano. Its source is Lake Campotosto near the border with the province of L'Aquila. The river flows northeast before joining the Vomano south of Crognaleto.
