= January 2017 European cold wave =

Period of cold weather in Central and Eastern Europe

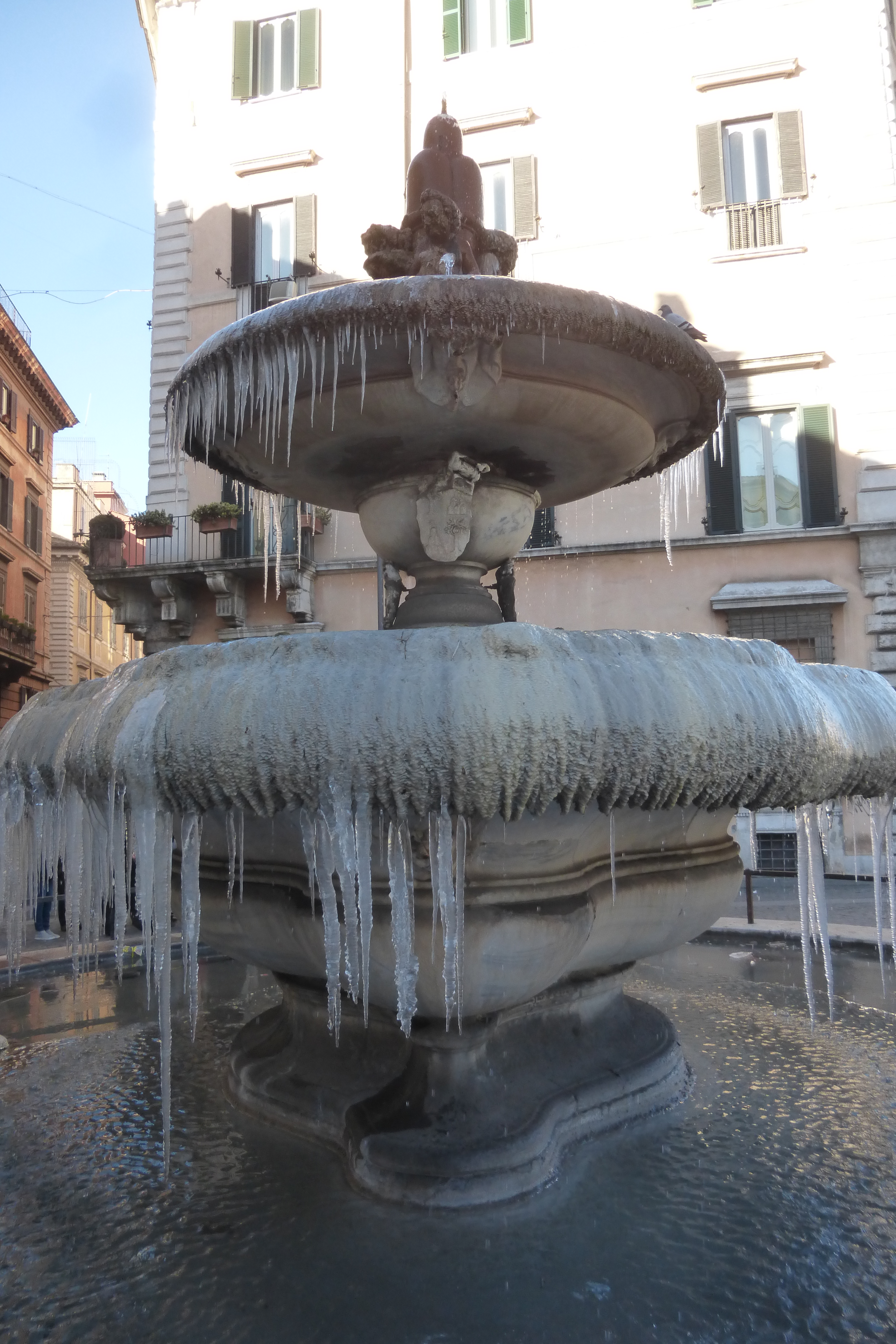
- A frozen fountain in Rome on 7 January 2017

Meteorological history
- Formed: 5 January 2017

Cold wave
- Lowest temp: −45.4 °C (−49.7 °F) in Oparino, Russia

Overall effects
- Fatalities: 73+
- Areas affected: Eastern Europe, Central Europe, Italy, Turkey

A period of exceptionally cold and snowy winter weather in January 2017 occurred in Eastern and Central Europe. In some areas, flights and shipping services were suspended, and there was major disruption to power supplies and other essential infrastructure. The weather was the result of stationary high pressure over western Europe, resulting in strong winds circulating from Russia and Scandinavia towards eastern Europe. On 9 January, the Continental Arctic (cA) air mass extended from Germany across the Balkans, resulting in deep snow in Greece and strong bora winds affecting Croatia in particular. In addition, heavy snow in central and Southern Italy was the result of cold air flowing across the warmer Adriatic Sea. At least 73 deaths were attributed to the cold wave.

== Affected areas ==
During the first week of 2017, 46 (mainly homeless) people died from the cold in Poland, when temperatures fell below −20 °C (−4 °F). Free public transport was provided in Warsaw, Kraków and Kielce because of the smog caused by the cold weather. Wrocław was also affected by smog with air quality in the area dropping to critical levels. Seven cold-related deaths were reported in Italy as of 9 January, mainly of homeless people, and parts of the country experienced exceptional falls of snow, high winds and freezing temperatures. Several airports were closed, including those in Sicily, Bari and Brindisi. Ice formed on the Adriatic Sea, and schools in the south of the country were closed. On 10 January, shipping was halted along a 900 km (560 mi) stretch of the Danube in Romania, Croatia and Serbia, because of the icy conditions.

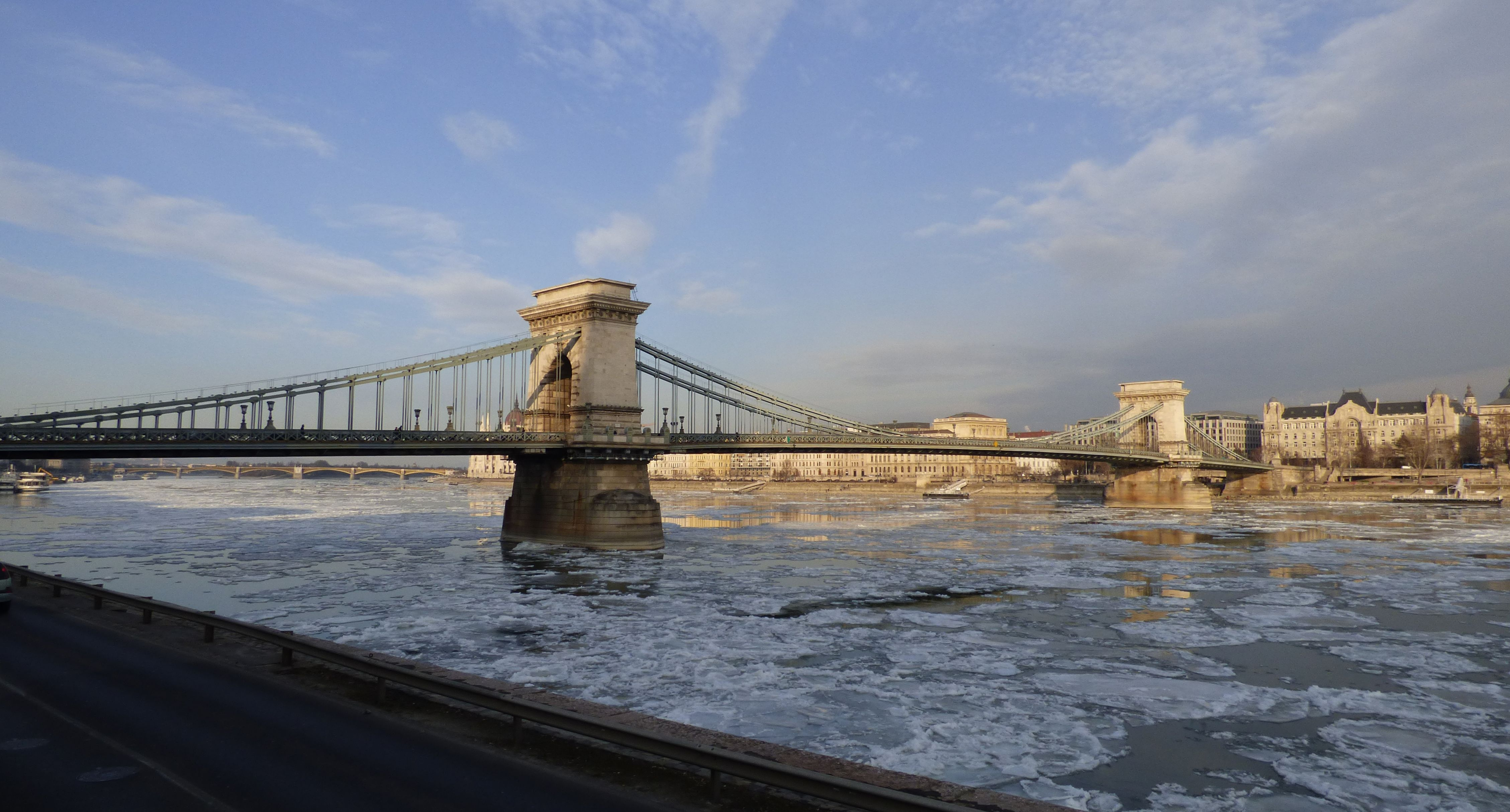
The frozen Danube in Budapest on 9 January

Eight deaths from the cold were reported in the Czech Republic, mainly of homeless people. The bodies of three migrants were found near the border between Bulgaria and Turkey. Médecins Sans Frontières raised concerns about the risk to migrants, especially around 2,000 people living in Belgrade. The Bosphorus was closed to shipping after a snowstorm that also affected services in Istanbul, Turkey, where more than 650 flights were grounded. Blizzards affected Bulgaria and also parts of Romania and Ukraine, and shipping on the Danube was suspended.

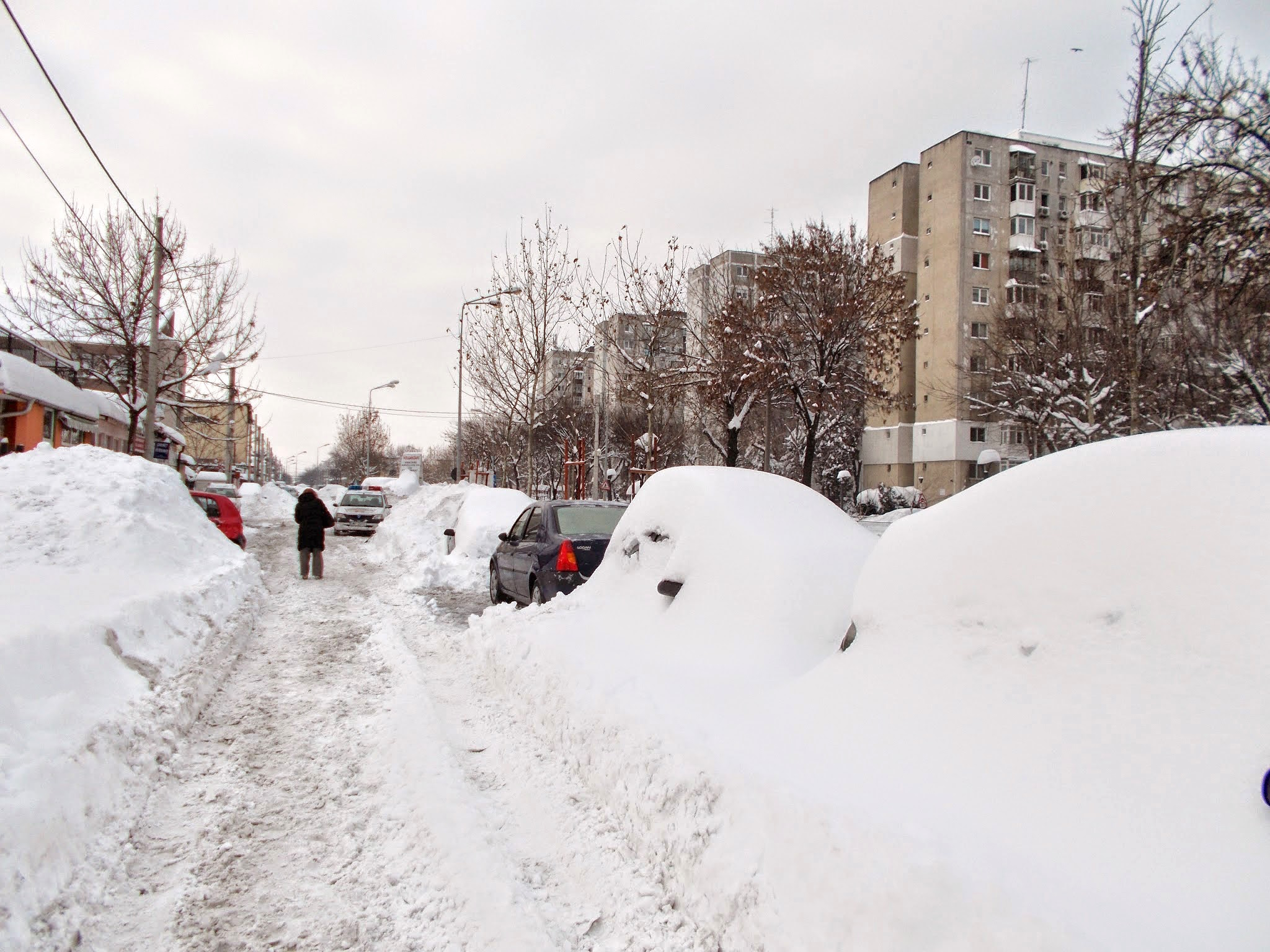
Heavy snow in Bucharest causes major disruption to the traffic (11 January).

Temperatures fell to −20 °C (−4 °F) in Greece, where the National Observatory of Athens referred to the weather phenomenon as Ariadne (after the goddess Ariadne). Greek authorities decided in 2016 in Greece to name extreme weather phenomena starting from January 2017; Ariadne was the first weather phenomenon to receive a name. The whole country was blanketed by unusually heavy snowfall, causing huge problems in transport. Snow even fell in Athens and Santorini. One migrant died of cold, and many migrants on islands in the Aegean Sea were moved into heated tents as the area was covered in snow. The authorities opened three Athens Metro tube stations to homeless people to help protect them from the cold. Road and public transport in the country were also disrupted. On 10 January, it was announced that in Thessaloniki in the province of Macedonia only 130 buses out of 480–500 operated by Thessaloniki Urban Transport Organisation were in operational condition. The islands of Euboea, Skopelos and Alonnisos declared a state of emergency after serious power failures and collapse of traffic due to snowfall. Mytilene on the island of Lesbos recorded a low of −5.7 °C (21.7 °F) on 7 January, a temperature expected to occur on average once in 300 years in current climatic conditions. January 2017 overall mean monthly temperature was 4.7 °C (8.5 °F) below average in Mytilene and Bucharest, and many weather stations reported monthly means more than 3 °C (5.4 °F) below average.

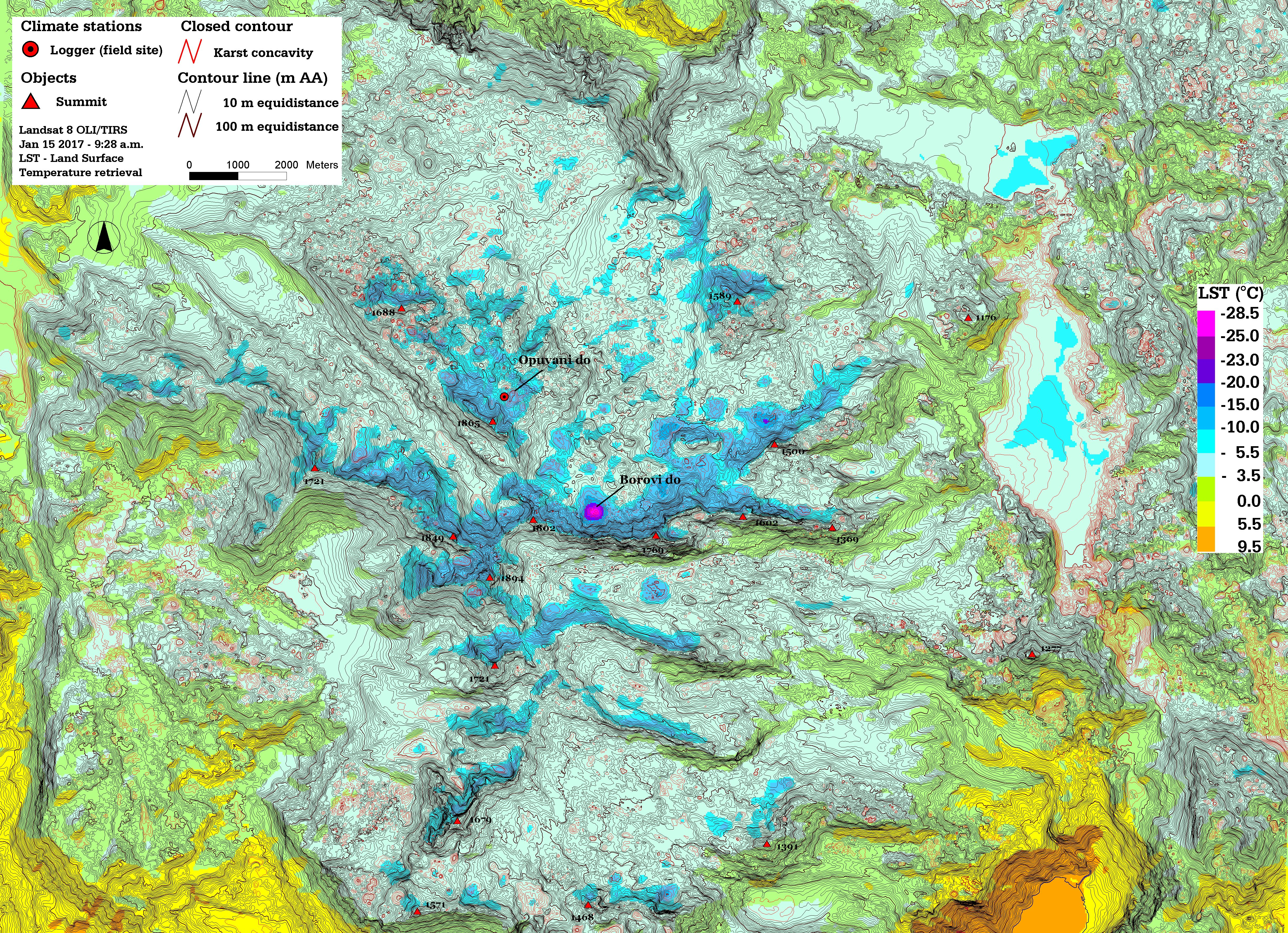
The Mediterranean coast and Mediterranean mountains of Montenegro were affected by the cold wave. On January 15 a Landsat LST surface temperature retrieval map shows very cold situations for higher parts but especially in depressions.

Deaths were also reported in Russia and Ukraine. Temperatures in some parts of European Russia fell to below −40 °C (−40 °F), setting records across the region. About 100,000 residents of settlements in Moscow Oblast such as Lyubertsy, Lytkarino, Dzerzhinsky and Kotelniki lost electricity due to extremely harsh temperatures. On 11 January, the cold wave reached Albania, with temperatures reaching −22 °C (−8 °F) and supplies being flown in by army helicopters, mainly in the city of Gjirokastër and the nation's capital Tirana.

On 16 January, it was reported that the electricity prices in Europe were at their highest since 2008 as a result of power outages and increased demand. Romanian Energy Minister, Toma Petcu, suggested that, if coal consumption remained high, reserves held by the country's two major producers would only last for four days.

== Temperature records ==
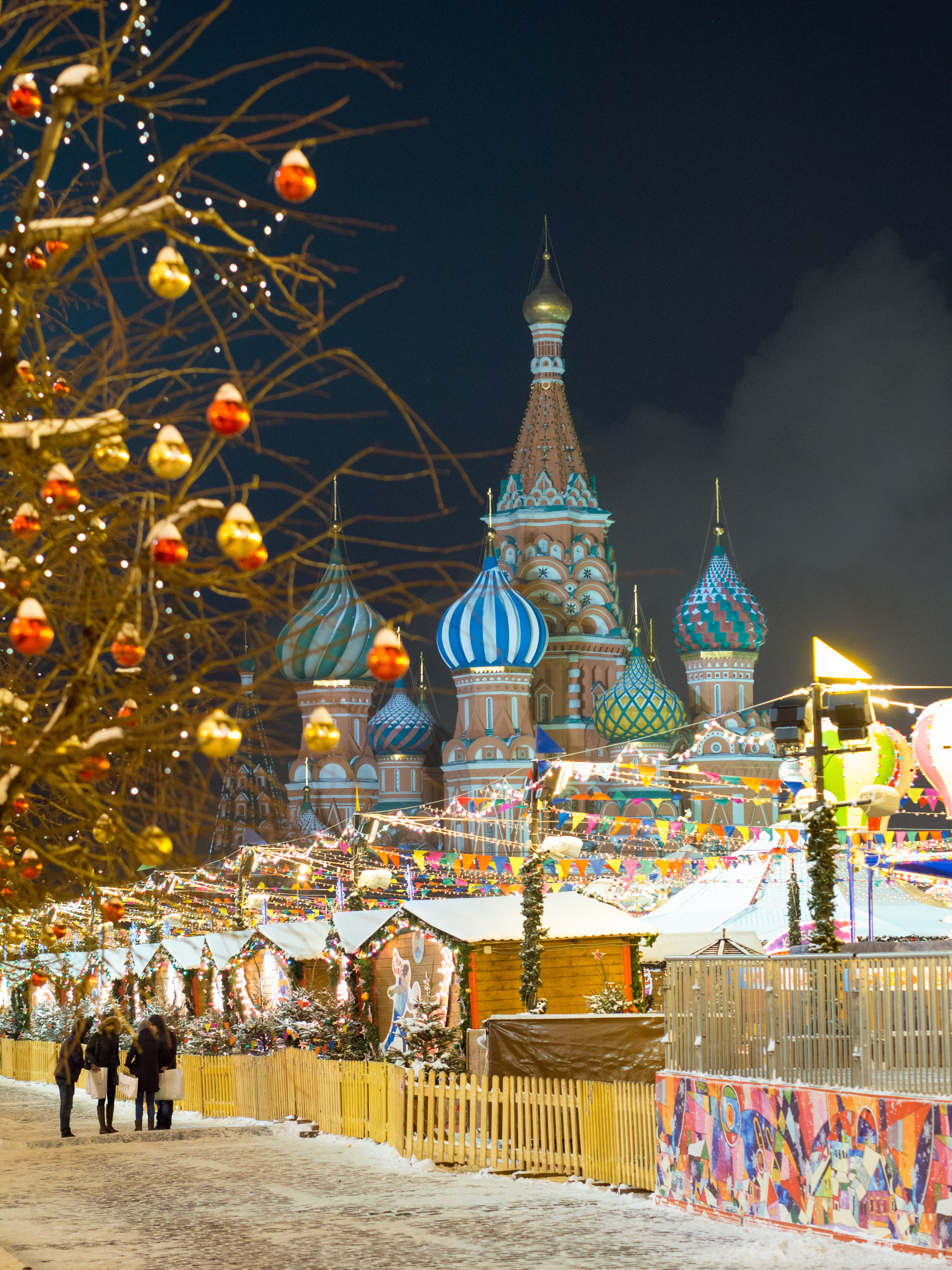
Moscow, 8 January 2017, 00:14, −27 °C (−17 °F)

7 January was reported to be the coldest Orthodox Christmas in Moscow in 120 years, at −29.9 °C (−21.8 °F). The lowest temperature in western Europe was recorded in the Swiss village of La Brévine, also at −29.9 °C (−21.8 °F) on 6 January. On 8 January a low temperature record for this day in Hungary was set in Tésa, at −28.1 °C (−18.6 °F). On the same day a record low temperature was measured in Tver Oblast, Russia, at −35.7 °C (−32.3 °F), which surpassed the previous 1987 record for that day. Kirov plummeted to −38.3 °C (−36.9 °F) on 8 January too.

=== Minimum temperatures measured during the cold wave ===
- Rome: -4.2°C (8 January 2017)
- Florence: -6.9°C (9 January 2017)
- Naples: -5.7°C (8 January 2017)
- Milan: -6.2°C (7 January 2017)
- Athens: -1.5°C (9 January 2017)
- Zurich: -12.7°C (7 January 2017)
- Bern: -15.3°C (7 January 2017)
- Dresden: -12.2°C (6 January 2017)
- Moscow: -29.9°C (7 January 2017)
- Vienna: -13.9°C (7 January 2017)
- Budapest: -16.6°C (8 January 2017)
- Ljubljana: -13.3°C (11 January 2017)
- Prague: -14.1°C (7 January 2017)
- Bratislava: -12.6°C (11 January 2017)
- Belgrade: -14.6°C (8 January 2017)
- Sarajevo: -22.2°C (8 January 2017)
- Riga: -19.2°C (7 January 2017)
- Warsaw: -19.3°C (7 January 2017)
- Minsk: -25.1°C (7 January 2017)
- Kyiv: -18.7°C (7 January 2017)
- Bitola: -24.6°C (8 January 2017)
- Sofia: -17.2°C (12 January 2017)
- Vilnius: -23.5°C (7 January 2017)

== Deaths ==
At least 61 people died in relation to the cold, many of them migrants or homeless. Approximately one-third of the deaths were in Poland; others took place in Albania, Bulgaria, the Czech Republic, Italy, Greece, and North Macedonia.

== See also ==
- Rigopiano avalanche
- Early 2014 North American cold wave
- Early 2012 European cold wave
- 2006 European cold wave
- 2006 European heat wave
- 2003 European heat wave
