= Montorio al Vomano =

Comune in Abruzzo, Italy

- Comune
- Comune di Montorio al Vomano
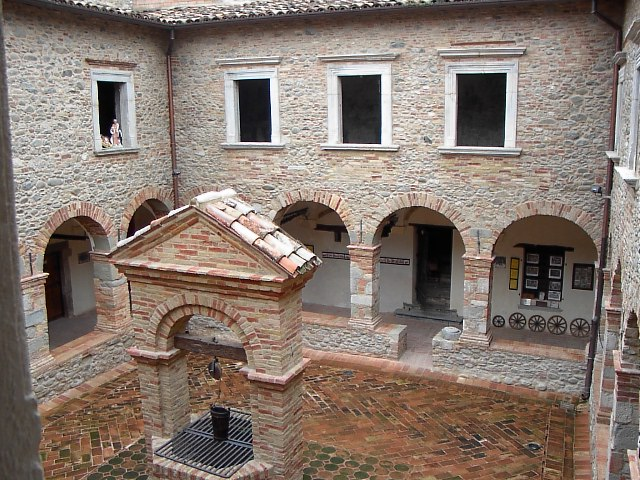
- Cloister of the church of the Zoccolanti.

- Coat of arms

- Location within Italy Location within Abruzzo
- Coordinates: 42°35′N 13°38′E
- Country: Italy
- Region: Abruzzo
- Province: Teramo (TE)
- Frazioni: see list

Government
  - Mayor: Fabio Altitonante (Forza Italia)

Area
  - Total: 53.57 km^{2} (20.68 sq mi)
- Elevation: 262 m (860 ft)

Population (31 August 2017)
  - Total: 8,028
  - Density: 149.9/km^{2} (388.1/sq mi)
- Demonym: Montoriesi
- Time zone: UTC+1 (CET)
  - Summer (DST): UTC+2 (CEST)
- Postal code: 64046
- Dialing code: 0861
- Patron saint: St. Roch
- Saint day: 16 August
- Website: Official website

Montorio al Vomano (Abruzzese: Mundurje) is a town and comune in the province of Teramo, in the Abruzzo region of central-southern Italy. It is located in the natural park known as the Gran Sasso e Monti della Laga National Park.

== Geography ==
The city is located at the upper inland entrance of the Vomano valley, on the banks of the river with the same name. The territory of the Montorio al Vomano commune contains a mountainous area but in larger part is made up of hills and open plains. A hilly incline known as Il Colle (The Hill) leads up from the right bank of this river and provides views of the valley below. Above the town are the ruins of the Fortress San Carlo, initiated in 1686 by the Spanish Marchese del Carpio to fight against the brigand forces.

There are several hypotheses regarding the origination of the name "Montorio". The most likely is that the name derives from the Latin Mons Aureus (Golden Mountain), referring to the plains surrounding the town that were once covered in a luxurious open expanses of golden grains. Supporting this theory are the shape and configuration of the town symbol which shows three hills, each with a sheaf of grain planted atop.

== History ==
The discovery of the ruins of a temple dedicated to Hercules attests to ancient origins of the city. It is believed that present-day Montorio al Vomano sits in the location of the old city of Beregra, mentioned by geographers in the classical age of Rome. Others historians and archaeologists believe that Beregra was located more to the north, near the current town of Civitella del Tronto. During medieval times, Montorio al Vomano experienced an important period of growth and development. Records show the town referred to as Mons Aureus before finally taking on its current name of Montorio al Vomano. In the 15th century, by decree of Alfonso V of Naples, the town was annexed by the feudal state of Pietro Camponeschi from nearby L'Aquila. By way of marriage, Montorio al Vomano passed into the hands of the Carafa and Caracciolo families, both from Napoli. Then in 1596 the Crescenzi family from Rome took control of the town before finally ceding the area once again to Neapolitans, this time the Marchesi di Santo Spirito.

Montorio al Vomano hosts a number of expanding economic enterprises. A multinational Canadian glass bottle and container factory, Consumers Glass, is known throughout the world. The agriculture of the area is centered on grains and olives as well as wood products. In the future, salt and sulfur thermal springs located in nearby Piane di Collevecchio are likely to see increased activity and further serve to diversify the local economy.

== Main sights ==
Situated in the principal city square, Piazza Orsini, is the Church of San Rocco. Commissioned by the Countess Vittoria Camponeschi, construction of this church was initiated in 1527. The irregular and asymmetrical façade of the church is built of stone, brick, and plaster. San Rocco contains four painted wooden altars decorated with gold leaf dating to the late 17th and early 18th centuries. The Sacristy houses a wooden bust of St. Roch dating from the 16th century, a Neapolitan silver statue of the same saint from about 1735, and an ancient bell organ. Several ornate tapestries are also on display. One, depicting the Resurrection, dates back to 1530 and a second, The Last Supper, to 1607.

The Capuchin Convent and Church of Santa Maria della Salute was founded in 1576. Its architectural features are influenced by the vows of poverty of the Franciscan Friars. The face of the church is adorned with a decorative rectilinear crown.

The Church of the Zoccolanti is in the historical center of the town. Restored in 1755, but earlier records indicate that the church has much older origins. On the main altar is a coat of arms of a Franciscan Minor Order and a wooden statue of Mary Immaculate dating back to 1696. On another altar there is an exceptional painting of a penitent Saint Margaret. The enclosed cloisters contain 17th-century burial vaults with traces of fresco paintings.

On the outskirts of town, towards Teramo, is the Church of San Lorenzo which sits atop ancient Roman archaeological findings. The remains of the Temple of Hercules is about 6 kilometres (4 mi) from Montorio al Vomano in the direction of L'Aquila along an ancient Roman road.

== Traditions ==
A somewhat idiosyncratic tradition of the people of Montorio al Vomano occurs during the carnival season. Its theme is death itself and derives from the comedy of arts, a populist style of theater developed in Italy in the 16th century. The origins of this custom probably relate to the removal and collection of the trappings of the just-completed carnival season on Ash Wednesday, the first day of Lent. A coffin accompanied by throngs of people, including costumed mourners in funeral attire, is carried through the streets. Funeral dirges are played and interspersed with irreverent passages of joy and happiness.

The tradition of the 'Lu Stu, whose origination is unknown, takes place around the Christmas Holidays. During the celebration the townspeople gather together and are met by small groups of people carrying decks of 40 playing cards depicting historical figures. These encounters and card games are characterized by gestures, animated discussions, and salty witticisms in the local vernacular dialect. This custom is practiced in very few Italian communities and may well have ancient Irish roots from a pre-Christian era.

Another important tradition recognizes a great battle known as the "Conspiracy of the Barons" that took place on the outskirts of Teramo on 7 May 1486. At this time 500 soldiers from the Teramo area, under the orders of Pope Innocent VIII and led by Captain Roberto Sanseverino, encountered the troops of Alfonso, Duke of Calabria and son of King Ferdinand of Aragon. From the roofs of the houses and the city walls, the townspeople of Montorio al Vomano were able witness this fierce military engagement. Actors in authentic dress play the parts of soldiers during the present day enactment of this historical event.

== Gastronomy ==
One dish appreciated by many of the citizens of the area is grilled trout taken directly from the Vomano river. The gastronomy of Montorio is perhaps best characterized by homemade pastry products assembled in accordance with ancient local customs. A representative dish is the well known Bocconotti, made in the traditional manner of Abruzzo using fresh eggs, almonds, olive oil, lemons and grape preserves. In order to enhance its flavor, the delicacy is typically accompanied by a refreshing glass of the local red wine. Pizza Dolce is a cake with a velvety cream frosting and is commonly garnished with crushed sweet almonds, cinnamon, and bitter chocolate. It can often be found at wedding celebrations.

== Frazioni ==
Altavilla, Colledonico, Collevecchio, Cusciano, Faiano, Leognano, Piane di Collevecchio, San Lorenzo, San Giorgio, San Giovanni, San Mauro, Schiaviano, Villa Brozzi, Villa Maggiore, Villa Vallucci

== Notable people ==
- Odorico D'Andrea (1916–1990), Catholic Italo-Nicaraguan priest

== Sister cities ==
- Amatrice, Italy
- Aprilia, Italy, since 2000

== See also ==
- Abruzzo (wine)
