= Collevecchio, Montorio al Vomano =

Village in Abruzzo, Italy

Coordinates: 42°35′44″N 13°39′50″E

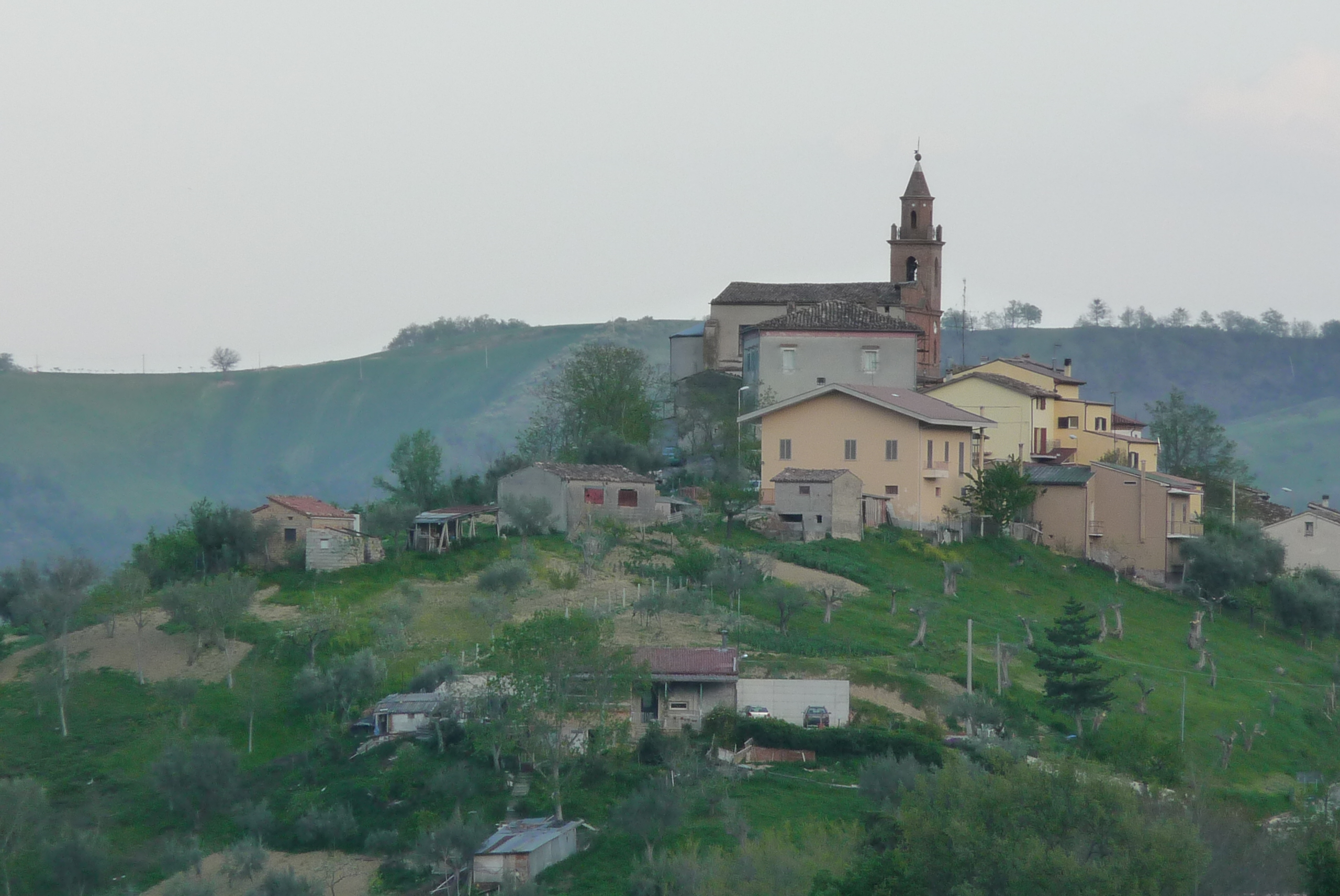
Collevecchio

Saint Sebastian Church

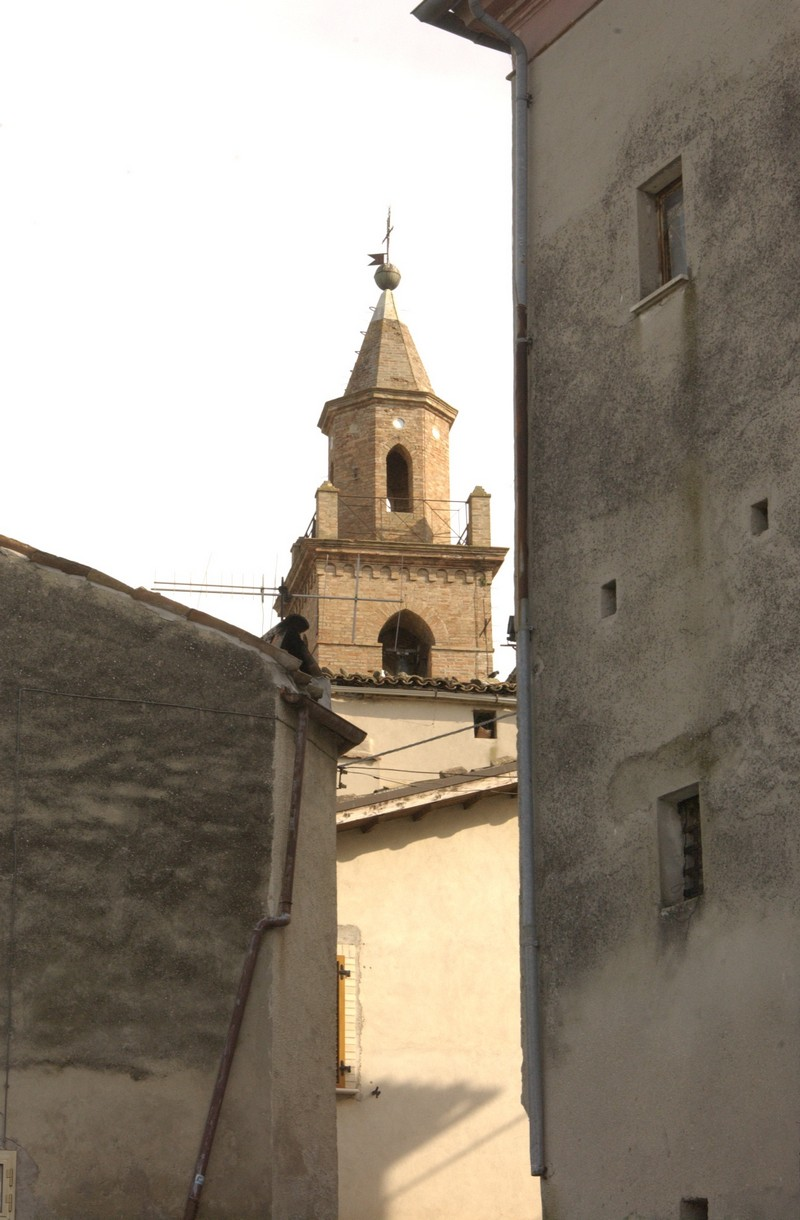
Saint Sebastian Church

Collevecchio is a small village in the Abruzzo region of Italy. It is a frazione of the comune of Montorio al Vomano.

== Geography ==
The provincial capital, Teramo is about 6 miles to the north. Collevecchio rises from the peak of a hill known as "Colla Croce." A short distance below the village is the Strada Statale 80 (State Road 80) which begins in Giulianova on the Adriatic Sea, passes near the Gran Sasso (the highest peak in the Apennine Mountains), and eventually leads to another provincial capital, L'Aquila.

== History ==
Collevecchio is of historical importance in that the Bishop of Teramo traditionally also carried the title, Baron of Collevecchio. The earliest known records relating to Collevecchio date back to 894 when the Bishop of Teramo, Giovanni I, was involved in a land exchange with a count from the Abruzzo region, Adelberto. The Monastery of Santa Maria, which likely fell within the territory surrounding the town, is cited in these documents. In 1813, Collevecchio lost its independence and was annexed by the town of Montorio al Vomano. It was only a small village in the 1800s and an 1881 census lists a population of only 42 inhabitants.

The building where the elementary school is located dates back to the early 1900s. Following the construction of a large aqueduct by the firm of Massimo Del Fante, running water reached the Collevecchio in 1935. Rising through the village is a provincial (formerly classified as a state) lane which connects to the larger road (SS 80) running from Teramo to Montorio al Vomano. It was paved only in the mid 1960s.

In recent years, Collevecchio has lost its population. Some of the citizens have moved closer to the SS 80 or to Teramo. Others have emigrated to other countries and regions of Italy. Some two miles from Collevecchio, in the direction of Teramo, is a manufacturer of spirits owned and operated by the Paesani family. One of their most popular liqueurs is called "Amaro Gran Sasso" (Gran Sasso Bitters) and is famous throughout Italy and in many other nations of the world.

== Churches ==
The patron saint of Collevecchio is Saint Sebastian and a church bearing his name is found in the village center. It can be assumed that this church was closely linked with the Monastery of Santa Maria located in the valley below. In years past, the practice of building a fortified structure at a higher elevation was rather common as it provided a place of refuge in the event of military threats or attacks. Many such structures were erected following the first invasions of the Saracens in the 9th century. Hence, the hilltop location of today's Collevecchio.

With the presence of a monastery and a castle, came the need for a church. By Papal Decree, the Church of Saint Sebastian was constructed. In one document, Pope Anastasio refers the area where the church was built as “Monasterium S. Sebastiani in Gomano”. A chapel dedicated to this saint may well have stood in this location. The old church bells of Saint Sebastian were moved to a nearby church called "San Michele di Colledonico". The current church bells are relatively new with the oldest dating back only to 1870. These were cast by the Della Noce Company of nearby Penna Sant'Andrea. On the interior of one bell is the inscription: “Fideles voco-Festas honoro-Mortuos ploro-Tempestates fugo-1870 Della Noce T”. Two smaller bells are believed to have been manufactured in 1914. The Church of Saint Sebastian has undergone several restorations. In 1857 Father Don Paolo Cesi of Teramo, with support of the local people, completed one church modification. A 1900 project reduced the dimensions of the church. Records indicate that one stone used in this reconstruction dates back to the beginning of the second millennium. In the years 1931-1932 the church was adorned with a new balustrade and altars made of marble. Finally, in 1942, the instructor Angiolina Di Salvatore in Sabatini helped to gather the necessary funds and arrange for another church altar dedicated to Saint Gabriel of the Sorrows. The church of Saint Sebastian has but one nave.
