= Odorico D'Andrea =

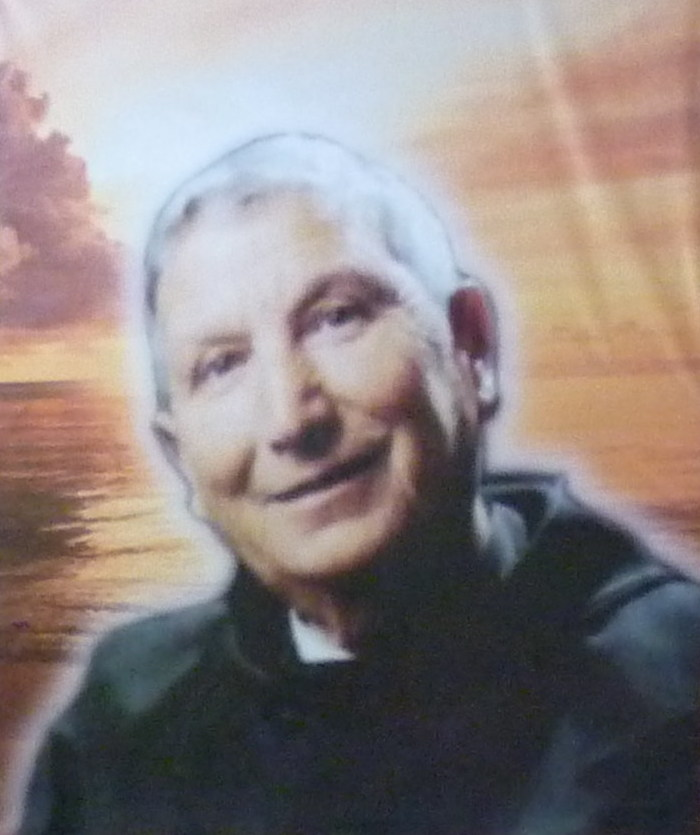
Portrait of Father Odorico D'Andrea, above the Sarcophagus with his mortal remains, in North Saint Rafael, Jinotega.

José D'Andrea Valeri (5 March 1916, in Montorio al Vomano, Italy – 22 March 1990, in Matagalpa, Nicaragua) known as "Padre Odorico D'Andrea", was an Italo-Nicaraguan Catholic priest. He founded the Franciscan Sisters Pilgrims of the Immaculate Heart of Mary (Hermanas Franciscanas Pelegrinas del Corazon Inmaculado de Maria), along with Father Francisco Javier Munguía Alvarado, also a Franciscan. He was a missionary of the Order of Friars Minor (Ordo Fratrum Minorum) or Franciscans, devoted to the mission in the communities of the City of San Rafael del Norte in the department of Jinotega, Nicaragua.

He is known as Servant of God (Siervo de Dios) Fr. Odorico D'Andrea.

== Early life ==
He was born on 5 March 1916 in Montorio, Italy as the son of Catholic parents Antonio D'Andrea and Ana Rosa Valeri.

On 26 September 1930, he entered the Franciscan Lower Seminary of Città di Castello in Umbria. On 10 September 1933, in the novitiate of the la Santa Annunziata in Amelia he adopted the name Odorico.

On 25 April 1942, he received priestly ordination in Santa María degli Angeli near Assisi. After a brief period in the seminary of Farneto in 1945, he moved to the Convents of Amelia, Lugnano and Pantanelli in Umbria, from where he exerted the itinerant apostolate in Toscolano, Melezzole Morre and Attigliano.

== Career ==
In 1952 he requested his superiors to be sent to their Mission in Nicaragua. He arrived in Nicaragua on 26 August 1953, and was allocated to the House of San José in Matagalpa.

=== Social work in Jinotega Department, Nicaragua ===
He is considered a prophet and conciliator of peace in Nicaragua by the Catholic Church in time of war, for getting together the Contras with the Popular Sandinista Army.

He reconstructed the hermitage of San Rafael del Norte and the Community of La Concordia (1962).

He initiated construction of the Hospital of San Rafael (1964). He managed the installation of drinkable water for San Rafael del Norte and the community of Savannah Grande (1965). He built the hermitage of Tepeyac, and the house of Retreat Tepeyac (1966), where the Via Crucis is the most famous in Nicaragua. He built the school of the Community of San Marcos and a medical dispensary (1967). He built the house for doctors and the sick (1947).

== Death ==
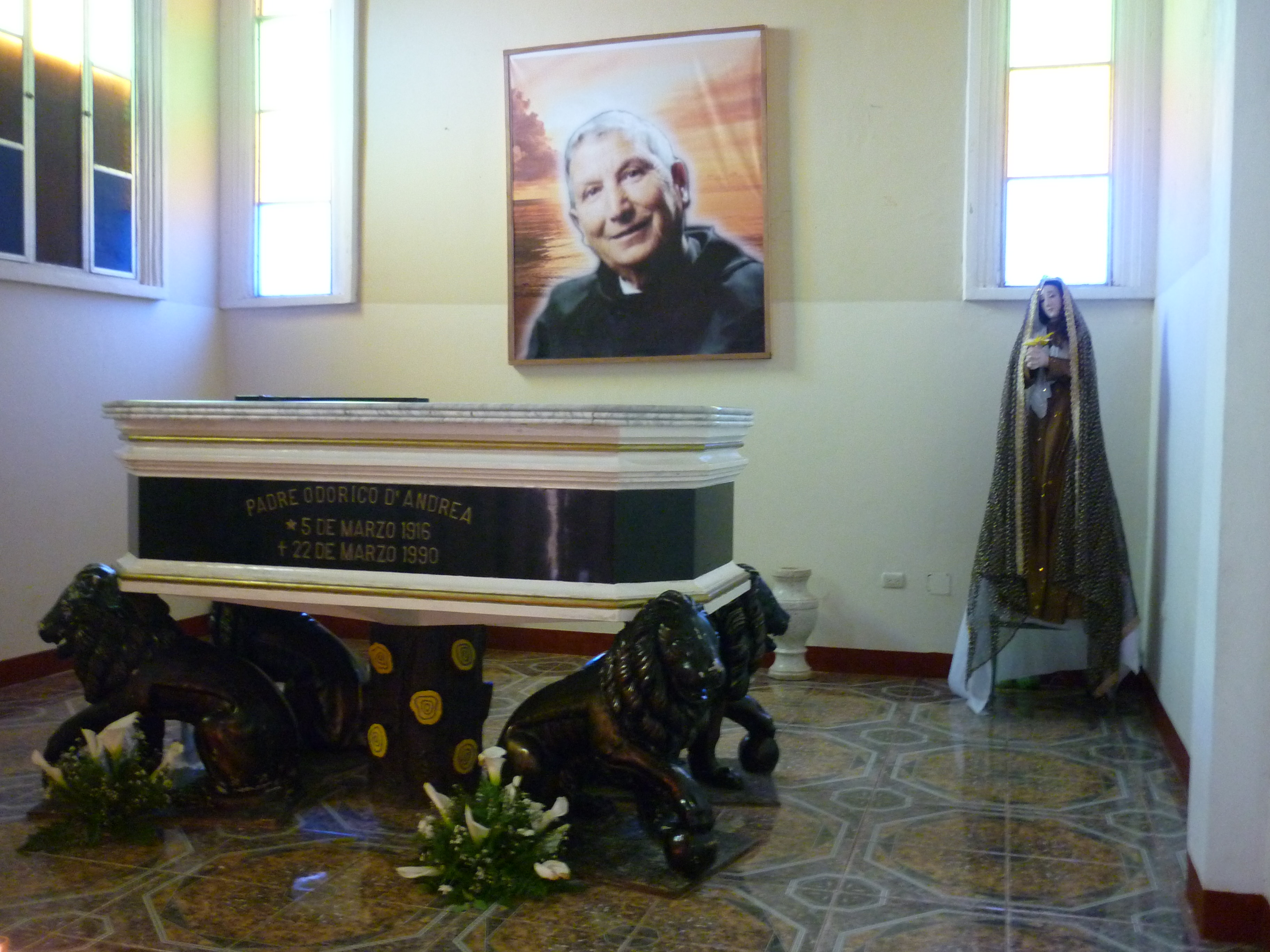
Sarcophagus with the mortal remains of Father Odorico D` Andrea in North Saint Rafael, Jinotega.

He died due to a complete blockage of the left artery in his heart (22 March 1990). His burial was attended by more than ten thousand people.

His body was interred and exhumed to be placed in a sarcophagus inside the Tepeyac chapel. Steps for the canonization process of the now called "Servant of God" were then started in 2002 by Bishop Sergio Goretti.
