= Farindola =

- Comune
- Comune di Farindola
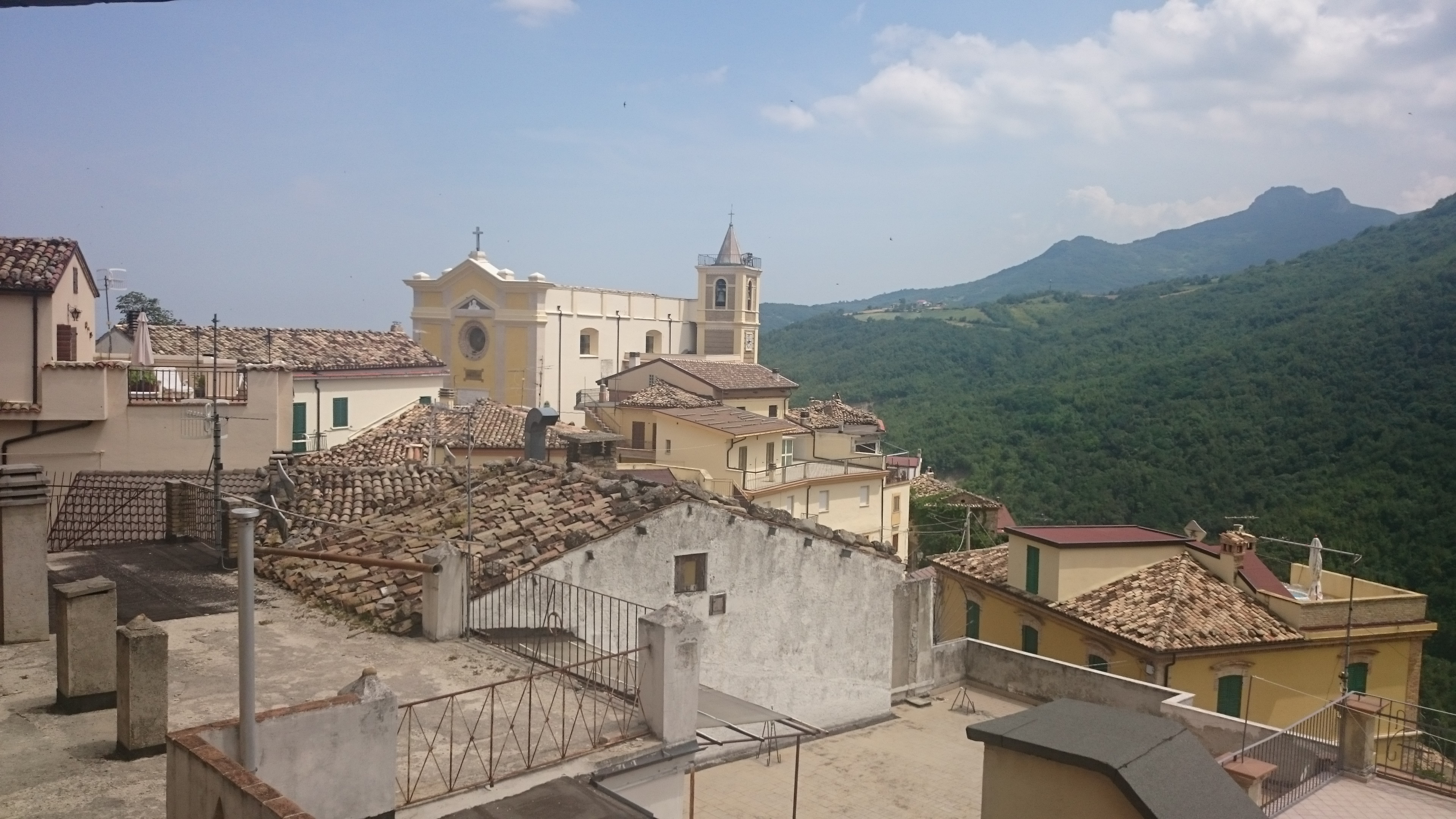
- View of Farindola

- Coat of arms

- Location within Italy Location within Abruzzo
- Coordinates: 42°26′34″N 13°49′16″E
- Country: Italy
- Region: Abruzzo
- Province: Pescara (PE)
- Frazioni: Casebruciate, Cupoli, Fiano, Macchie, Pagliaroli, Rigopiano, Ripe, Ronchetti, San Quirico, Santa Maria, Trosciano Inferiore, Trosciano Superiore, Vicenne

Government
  - Mayor: Ilario Lacchetta

Area
  - Total: 45 km^{2} (17 sq mi)
- Elevation: 530 m (1,740 ft)

Population (2007)
  - Total: 1,694
  - Density: 38/km^{2} (97/sq mi)
- Demonym: Farindolesi
- Time zone: UTC+1 (CET)
  - Summer (DST): UTC+2 (CEST)
- Postal code: 65010
- Dialing code: 085
- Patron saint: St. Nicholas of Bari
- Website: Official website

Farindola (Abruzzese: Farìnnele) is a comune and town in the province of Pescara in the Abruzzo region of Italy. It is located in the Gran Sasso e Monti della Laga National Park.

Outside the town, located near the Gran Sasso massif and thus characterized by a continental humid climate, are the Vitello d'Oro falls, with a height of 28 metres (92 ft).

== History ==
As for Fara San Martino, the name of the village comes from the Lombard word for "borough", but various Palaeolithic findings point to an earlier origin. In the 11th century two important Benedictine monasteries occupied the area. Later on the village came under the control of the city of Penne and the Farnese family.

On 18 January 2017 the municipality was the scene of the Rigopiano avalanche, striking the luxury resort Hotel Rigopiano, which left twenty-nine people dead and eleven injured.
