= 2006 European cold wave =

Weather event in Europe

The 2006 European cold wave was an unusual and deadly cold wave which resulted in abnormal winter conditions over much of Europe. Southern Europe saw cold and snow, while places in northern Norway saw abnormally mild conditions. The phenomenon started in early January 2006, in the region of the Polar Urals, with temperatures nosediving below −50 °C, and extended to west Russia, then Central Europe where parts of Poland, Slovakia, and Austria saw temperatures drop below −30 °C. The cold wave resulted in the deaths of up to 50 people in Russia, and a significant death toll in Eastern Europe, including Ukraine, Moldova, and Romania. The abnormal conditions gradually abated towards the end of the month. According to Munich Re reinsurance company, it was the deadliest cold snap between 1980 and 2011, causing 790 fatalities throughout Europe. According to the International Federation of Red Cross and Red Crescent Societies, there were 884 deaths in Ukraine, 135 in Moscow, 13 in Moldova and 5 in Belarus, and over 20,000 cases of frostbite were treated in the region's hospitals. The damage to Russian crops due to severe frost was estimated at $929 million (equivalent to $1.48 billion in 2025).

== Temperatures recorded during the cold snap ==
- Novyy Urengoy: −53 °C (−63 °F)
- Yakutsk: −52 °C (−62 °F)
- Salehard: −50 °C (−58 °F)
- Vorkuta: −47 °C (−53 °F)
- Kittilä: −43 °C (−45 °F)
- Novosibirsk: −43 °C (−45 °F)
- Omsk: −42 °C (−44 °F)
- Ufa: −41.5 °C (−42.7 °F)
- Krasnoyarsk: −41 °C (−42 °F)
- Nur-Sultan: −40 °C (−40 °F)
- Uhta: −40 °C (−40 °F)
- Arkhangelsk: −38 °C (−36 °F)
- Utsjoki: −35 °C (−31 °F)
- Erzurum: −34 °C (−29 °F)
- Kazan: −33 °C (−27 °F)
- Volgograd: −33 °C (−27 °F)
- Helsinki: −33 °C (−27 °F)
- Voronezh: −31 °C (−24 °F)
- Moscow: −31 °C (−24 °F)
- Tallinn: −30 °C (−22 °F)
- Rostov-on-Don: −29 °C (−20 °F)
- Murmansk: −28 °C (−18 °F)
- Minsk: −28 °C (−18 °F)
- Vilnius: −28 °C (−18 °F)
- Stockholm: −27 °C (−17 °F)
- Riga: −27 °C (−17 °F)
- Warsaw: −26 °C (−15 °F)
- Dnipro: −26 °C (−15 °F)
- Hoher Sonnblick: −26 °C (−15 °F)
- Prague: −25 °C (−13 °F)
- Kyiv: −24 °C (−11 °F)
- Chişinău: −24 °C (−11 °F)
- Yerevan: −24 °C (−11 °F)
- Saalbach-Hinterglemm: −23 °C (−9 °F)
- Odesa: −22 °C (−8 °F)
- Longyearbyen: −22 °C (−8 °F)
- Säntis: −22 °C (−8 °F)
- Oslo: −21 °C (−6 °F)
- Dresden: −21 °C (−6 °F)
- Berlin: −20 °C (−4 °F)
- Gothenburg: −20 °C (−4 °F)
- Copenhagen: −20 °C (−4 °F)
- Oberwald: −20 °C (−4 °F)
- Glen Coe: −20 °C (−4 °F)
- Ankara: −19 °C (−2 °F)
- Bucharest: −19 °C (−2 °F)
- Braemar: −18 °C (0 °F)
- Niederönz: −18 °C (0 °F)
- Kremsmünster: −17 °C (1 °F)
- Elsenborn: −17 °C (1 °F)
- Crupet: −17 °C (1 °F)
- Salzburg: −17 °C (1 °F)
- Monschau: −16 °C (3 °F)
- Brescia: −16 °C (3 °F)
- Graz: −16 °C (3 °F)
- Vienna: −16 °C (3 °F)
- Herning: −16 °C (3 °F)
- Paris: −16 °C (3 °F)
- Burgas: −15 °C (5 °F)
- Vaduz: −15 °C (5 °F)
- Pepinster: −14 °C (7 °F)
- Innsbruck: −13 °C (9 °F)
- Enschede: −12 °C (10 °F)
- Wincrange: −12 °C (10 °F)
- Tromsø: −12 °C (10 °F)
- Goesdorf: −11 °C (12 °F)
- Manchester −10 °C (14 °F)
- Untereisenbach: −10 °C (14 °F)
- Luxembourg: −9 °C (16 °F)
- Basel: −9 °C (16 °F)
- Geneva: −9 °C (16 °F)
- Zurich: −9 °C (16 °F)
- Granada: −9 °C (16 °F)
- Leeuwarden: −9 °C (16 °F)
- Belfast: −8 °C (18 °F)
- Madrid: −8 °C (18 °F)
- Birmingham: −7 °C (19 °F)
- Sochi: −6 °C (21 °F)
- Dublin: −6 °C (21 °F)
- London: −5 °C (23 °F)
- Cagliari: −4 °C (25 °F)
- Corfu: −1 °C (30 °F)
- Barcelona: −1 °C (30 °F)
- Casablanca: −1 °C (30 °F)
- Palermo: 0 °C (32 °F)

Near freezing temperatures were also noted in the Balearic Islands, Western North Africa, and in extreme southern Spain.

Tambov took on a record low temperature of −38 °C (−36 °F) on 19 January.

Village Karajukića Bunari measured −39.8 °C (−39.6 °F) on 26 January, setting the minimum temperature record for Serbia.

== Snow in southern Europe ==
The anticyclone responsible for the cold temperatures brought snow to much of southern Europe. Algiers saw their first snow in over forty years and the snow brought icy and slippery conditions on the roads. A large portion of Greece also saw snow and Athens had a significant snowfall which cut off remote outlying areas, and the island of Limnos also received measurable snow.

The Balearic Islands had snow and freezing temperatures which resulted in the closure of the Palma de Mallorca Airport.

On 29 January, snow fell in Lisbon for the first time in 54 years. Snow began falling in the early morning in seaside towns like Figueira da Foz in central Portugal, and the storm reached down to the south to Algarve. Other towns with a record snowfall were Leiria, Santarém, Évora, Setúbal, Portalegre, Sesimbra, Palmela, Fátima, Pombal, Abrantes, Torres Novas and Ourém. Highways and roads were closed, and hundreds of people were evacuated from their vehicles in Montejunto. The storm caused a power-outage in Elvas and other parts of the Alentejo region. In Lisbon, the city government demanded that subway stations remain open overnight, so that homeless people could find shelter. Much of the south remained at 0 °C (32 °F), though by midday the north of the country had temperatures of 5–10 °C (41–50 °F).
