= Capitignano =

- Comune
- Comune di Capitignano
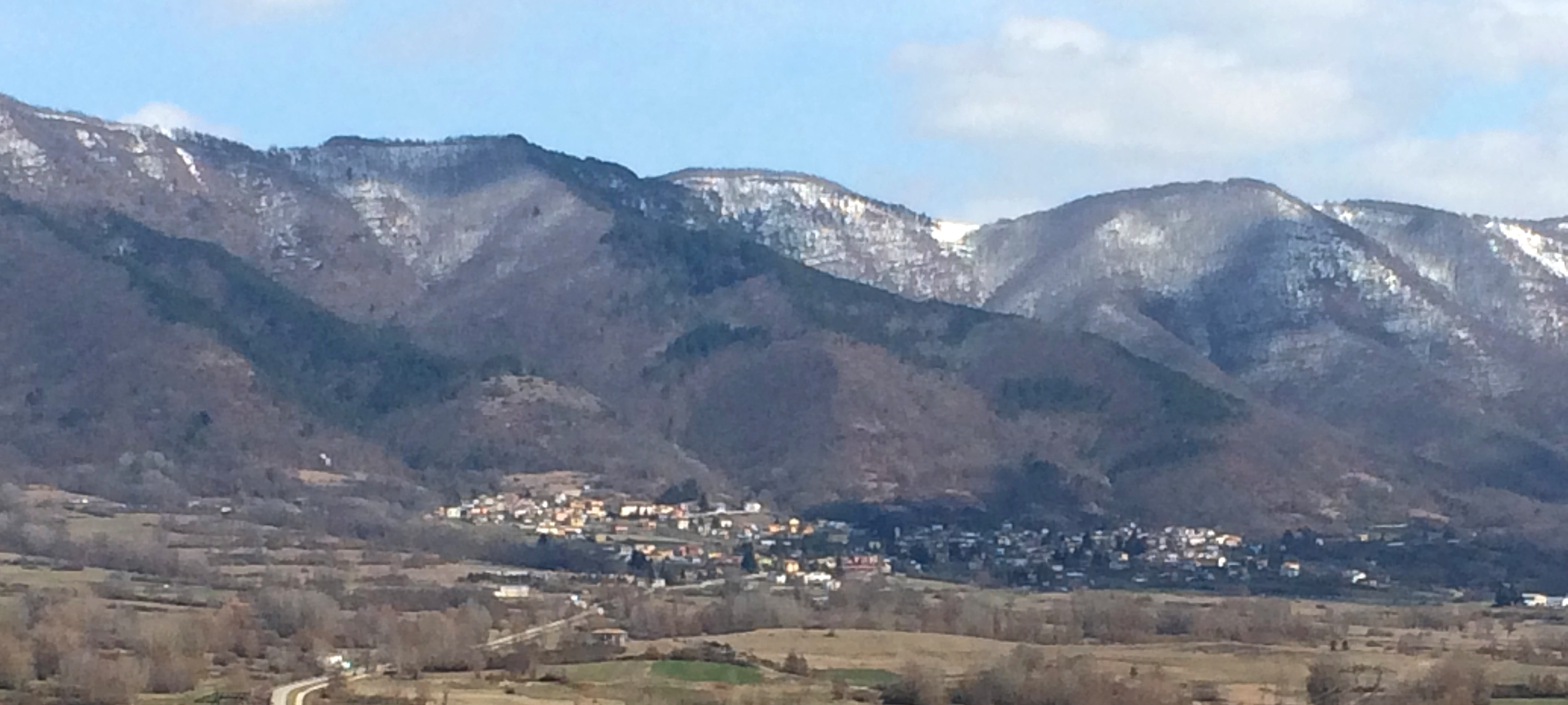

- Location within Italy Location within Abruzzo
- Coordinates: 42°31′22″N 13°17′54″E
- Country: Italy
- Region: Abruzzo
- Province: L'Aquila (AQ)
- Frazioni: Mapolino, Sivignano

Government
  - Mayor: Maurizio Pelosi

Area
  - Total: 30.62 km^{2} (11.82 sq mi)
- Elevation: 916 m (3,005 ft)

Population (31 May 2017)
  - Total: 668
  - Density: 21.8/km^{2} (56.5/sq mi)
- Demonym: Capitignanesi
- Time zone: UTC+1 (CET)
  - Summer (DST): UTC+2 (CEST)
- Postal code: 67014
- Dialing code: 0862
- Saint day: 24 November
- Website: Official website

Capitignano (Sabino dialect: Capignànu) is a comune and town in the province of L'Aquila in the Abruzzo region of Italy. It is located in the Gran Sasso e Monti della Laga National Park. Part of the territory of the municipality falls within the territory of the natural reserve of Lake Campotosto and of the Valle del Tronto.
