= Montereale, Abruzzo =

Montereale
- Comune
- Comune di Montereale
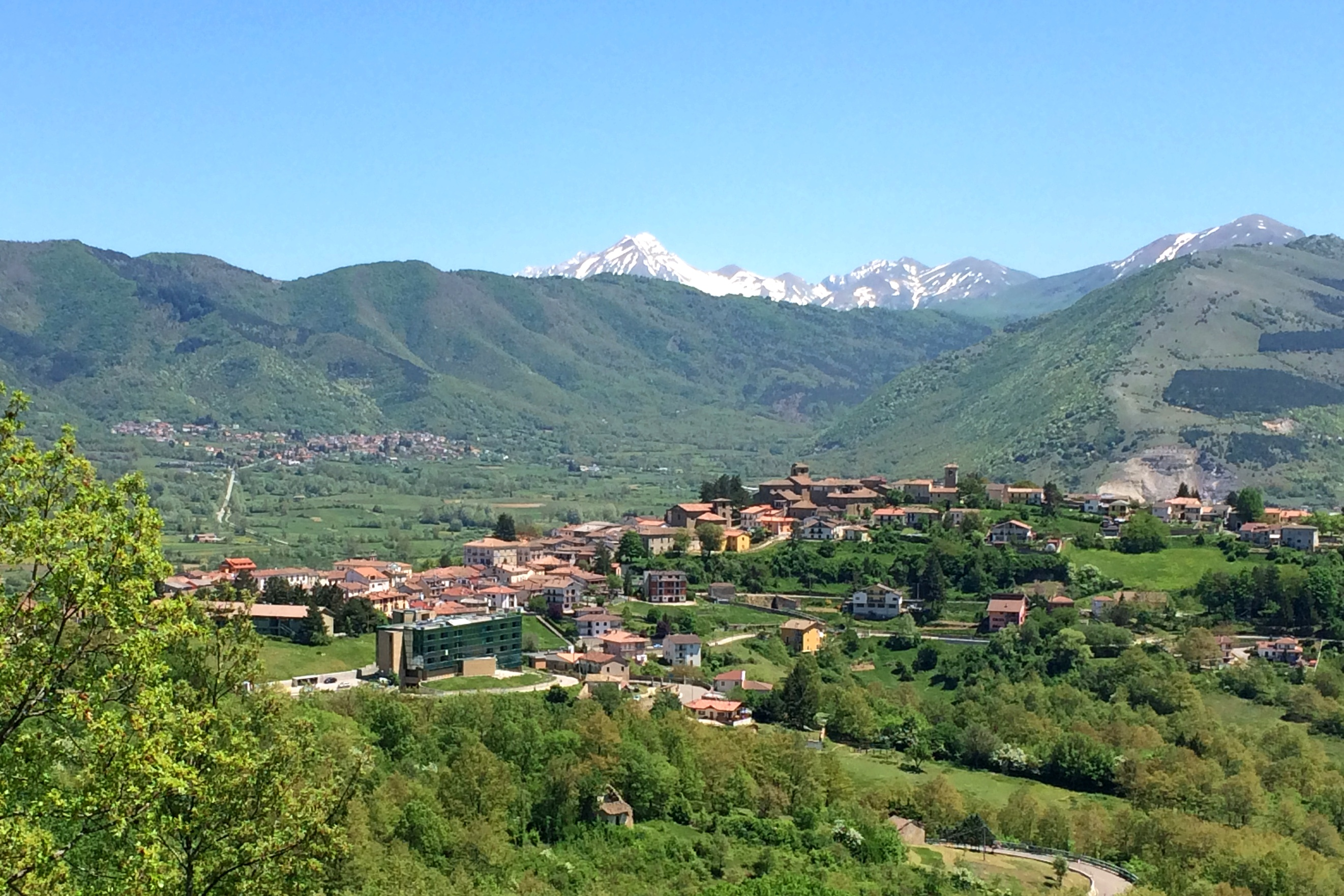

- Location within Italy Location within Abruzzo
- Coordinates: 42°31′30.882″N 13°14′38.1804″E
- Country: Italy
- Region: Abruzzo
- Province: L'Aquila (AQ)
- Frazioni: Aringo, Busci, Cabbia, Castello, Castel Paganica, Castiglione, Cesaproba, Colle, Ville di Fano - Lonaro, Marana, San Giovanni, Santa Vittoria, Verrico, Casale Bottone, Cavagnano, Colle Cavallari, Cavallari, Colle Calvo, Piedicolle, Colle Verrico, Marignano, Pellescritta, Santa Lucia, San Vito, Cesariano, San Giovanni Paganica, Colle Paganica, Paganica Castello

Government
  - Mayor: Massimiliano Giorgi

Area
  - Total: 104.42 km^{2} (40.32 sq mi)
- Elevation: 945 m (3,100 ft)

Population (30 November 2017)
  - Total: 2,486
  - Density: 23.81/km^{2} (61.66/sq mi)
- Demonym: Monterealesi
- Time zone: UTC+1 (CET)
  - Summer (DST): UTC+2 (CEST)
- Postal code: 67015
- Dialing code: 0862
- Patron saint: St. Andrew
- Saint day: September 13
- Website: Official website

Montereale is a comune and town in the province of L'Aquila, in the Abruzzo, region of Italy. It is located in the Gran Sasso e Monti della Laga National Park.

== Climate ==
Climate data for Montereale, elevation 938 m (3,077 ft), (1951–2000)
Month	Jan	Feb	Mar	Apr	May	Jun	Jul	Aug	Sep	Oct	Nov	Dec	Year
Record high °C (°F)	18.0 (64.4)	21.0 (69.8)	22.9 (73.2)	26.0 (78.8)	30.1 (86.2)	32.0 (89.6)	38.0 (100.4)	38.0 (100.4)	33.0 (91.4)	28.9 (84.0)	23.0 (73.4)	19.2 (66.6)	38.0 (100.4)
Mean daily maximum °C (°F)	6.1 (43.0)	7.3 (45.1)	10.2 (50.4)	12.7 (54.9)	18.4 (65.1)	22.6 (72.7)	26.5 (79.7)	26.8 (80.2)	22.1 (71.8)	16.5 (61.7)	10.7 (51.3)	7.0 (44.6)	15.6 (60.0)
Daily mean °C (°F)	1.7 (35.1)	2.5 (36.5)	4.9 (40.8)	7.5 (45.5)	12.4 (54.3)	16.1 (61.0)	19.1 (66.4)	19.3 (66.7)	15.6 (60.1)	10.9 (51.6)	6.0 (42.8)	2.7 (36.9)	9.9 (49.8)
Mean daily minimum °C (°F)	−2.8 (27.0)	−2.4 (27.7)	−0.4 (31.3)	2.3 (36.1)	6.5 (43.7)	9.7 (49.5)	11.8 (53.2)	11.9 (53.4)	9.0 (48.2)	5.2 (41.4)	1.3 (34.3)	−1.5 (29.3)	4.2 (39.6)
Record low °C (°F)	−17.4 (0.7)	−14.0 (6.8)	−13.0 (8.6)	−9.0 (15.8)	−3.6 (25.5)	0.0 (32.0)	3.8 (38.8)	1.0 (33.8)	−1.8 (28.8)	−5.0 (23.0)	−14.0 (6.8)	−15.0 (5.0)	−17.4 (0.7)
Average precipitation mm (inches)	71.4 (2.81)	72.8 (2.87)	67.7 (2.67)	77.6 (3.06)	68.8 (2.71)	56.6 (2.23)	36.8 (1.45)	50.3 (1.98)	69.0 (2.72)	84.8 (3.34)	107.8 (4.24)	101.9 (4.01)	865.5 (34.09)
Average precipitation days	9	9	9	11	9	7	5	6	7	9	10	10	101
Source: Regione Abruzzo

== See also ==
- 1703 Apennine earthquakes
