= Di Benedetto =

Di Benedetto (sometimes spelled DiBenedetto) is an Italian surname. Notable people with this name include:

- Alessandro Di Benedetto (born 1971), French offshore sailor and navigator
- Alonzo di Benedetto (1664–1729), Italian architect
- Antonio di Benedetto (1922–1986), Argentine novelist, short-story writer and journalist
- Francesco Dibenedetto (1941–2021), Italian football manager
- Giacomo Di Benedetto (born 1966), Italian jazz singer
- Giuseppe Di Benedetto (born 1946), Italian cardiac surgeon
- Ida Di Benedetto (born 1945), Italian actress and film producer
- Joseph DiBenedetto, associated with the New York-based Lucchese crime family
- Justin DiBenedetto (born 1988), Canadian ice hockey player
- Lexi DiBenedetto (born 1999), American actress
- Marco Di Benedetto (born 1995), Italian footballer
- Maria Domenica Di Benedetto (born 1953), Italian electrical engineer and control theorist
- Maria-Gabriella Di Benedetto (born 1958), Italian electrical, audio, and communications engineer
- Matías Di Benedetto (born 1992), Argentine footballer
- Matt DiBenedetto (born 1991), American racing driver
- Noemí Di Benedetto (1930–2010), Argentine artist
- Paola Di Benedetto (born 1995), Italian model and presenter
- Pietro di Benedetto dei Franceschi (c. 1415 – 1492), Italian Renaissance painter and mathematician
- Samuele Di Benedetto (born 2005), German footballer
- Thomas R. DiBenedetto (born 1949), American entrepreneur and chairman
- Vincenzo Di Benedetto (1934–2013), Italian classical philologist
- Zanobi di Benedetto Strozzi (1412–1468), Italian Renaissance painter

== See also ==
- Benedetto
