= Benedetto =

Benedetto is a common Italian name, the equivalent of the English name Benedict. Notable people named Benedetto include:

== People with the given name ==
- Benedetto Accolti (disambiguation), several people
- Benedetto Aloi (1935–2011), American mobster
- Benedetto Antelami (c. 1150–c. 1230), Italian architect and sculptor
- Benedetto Bonfigli (c. 1420–c. 1490), Italian painter
- Benedetto Bordone (1460–1531), Italian manuscript editor, miniaturist and cartographer
- Benedetto Brin (1833–1898), Italian naval administrator and politician
- Benedetto Cairoli (1825–1889), Italian statesman
- Benedetto Castelli (1578–1643), Italian mathematician
- Benedetto Cotrugli (1416–1469), Ragusan merchant, economist, scientist, diplomat and humanist
- Benedetto Croce (1866–1952), Italian philosopher and politician
- Benedetto Dei (1417–1492), Italian poet and historian
- Benedetto Della Vedova (born 1962), Italian politician
- Benedetto Ferrari (c. 1600–1681), Italian composer
- Benedetto Justiniani (1550–1622), Italian theologian
- Benedetto Luti (1666–1724), Italian painter
- Benedetto da Maiano (1442–1497), Italian sculptor
- Benedetto Marcello (1686–1739), Italian composer, writer, advocate, magistrate, and teacher
- Benedetto Pistrucci (1783–1855), Italian engraver
- Benedetto Santapaola (1938–2026), Italian mafioso
- Benedetto Spera (born 1934), Italian mafioso
- Benedetto Stay (1714–1801), Croatian Roman Catholic churchman
- Benedetto Varchi (c. 1500–1565), Italian humanist, historian, and poet
- Benedetto I Zaccaria (c. 1230–1307), Italian admiral

== People with the middle name ==
- Antonio Benedetto Carpano (1764–1815), Italian distiller
- Giovanni Benedetto Castiglione (1609–1664), Italian artist, painter, printmaker, and draftsman
- Giuseppe Benedetto Cottolengo (1786–1842), Italian saint
- Stefano Benedetto Pallavicino (1672–1742), Italian poet

== People with the surname ==
- Anthony Dominick Benedetto (1926–2023), Italian-American singer
- Darío Benedetto, (born 1990) Argentine professional footballer
- Enzo Benedetto (1905–1993), Italian painter
- Giacomo Benedetto (born 1972), British-Italian political scientist
- John Benedetto (born 1939), American mathematician
- Robert Benedetto (born 1946), American luthier
- Silvio Benedetto (1938–2026), Argentine-Italian painter and sculptor

== See also ==
- Di Benedetto
- San Benedetto (disambiguation)
