= Maria Di Benedetto =

Maria Di Benedetto may refer to:

- Maria Domenica Di Benedetto (born 1953), Italian electrical engineer specializing in control theory
- Maria-Gabriella Di Benedetto (born 1958), Italian electrical engineer specializing in speech processing and wireless communications

== See also ==
- Père Marie-Benoît, known in Italian as Maria Benedetto (1895–1990), Catholic monk who smuggled thousands of Jews from Nazi-occupied France
- Di Benedetto, other people with the same surname
