= Collepietro =

- Comune
- Comune di Collepietro
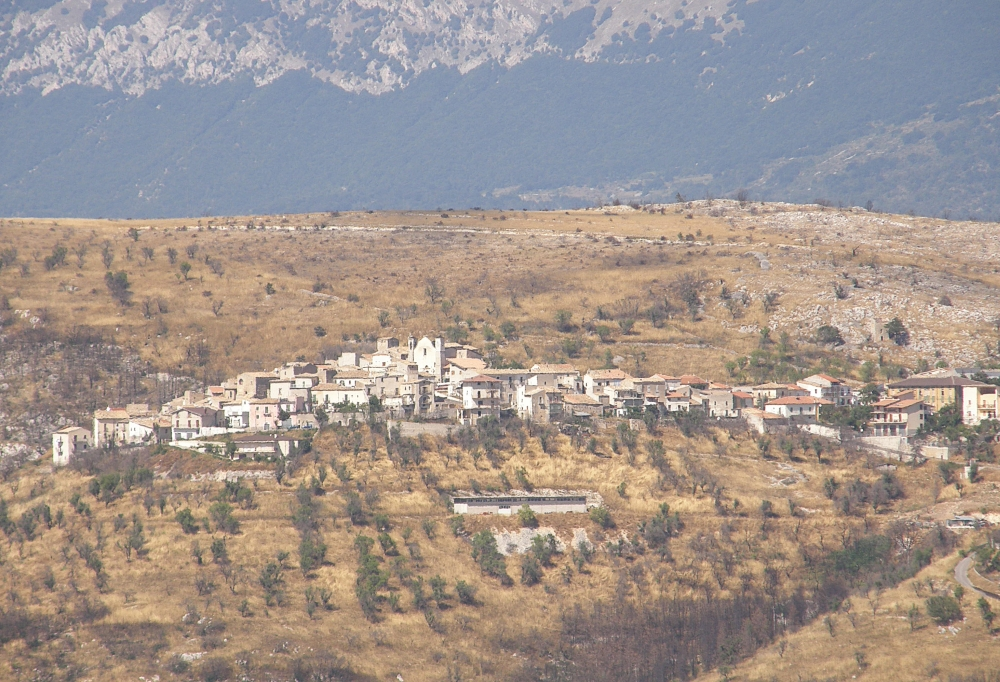

- Location within Italy Location within Abruzzo
- Coordinates: 42°13′22″N 13°46′49″E
- Country: Italy
- Region: Abruzzo
- Province: L'Aquila (AQ)
- Frazioni: Bussi sul Tirino (PE), Capestrano, Navelli, Popoli (PE), San Benedetto in Perillis

Area
  - Total: 15.24 km^{2} (5.88 sq mi)
- Elevation: 849 m (2,785 ft)

Population (31 December 2013)
  - Total: 243
  - Density: 15.9/km^{2} (41.3/sq mi)
- Demonym: Collepietrani
- Time zone: UTC+1 (CET)
  - Summer (DST): UTC+2 (CEST)
- Postal code: 67020
- Dialing code: 0862
- ISTAT code: 066040
- Patron saint: San Giovanni Battista
- Saint day: 24 June

Collepietro is a comune and town in the Province of L'Aquila in the Abruzzo region of Italy.
