= Castello Mediceo =

Coordinates: 42.2115°N 13.8294°E

Mediceo Castle
- Castello Mediceo
- Bussi sul Tirino
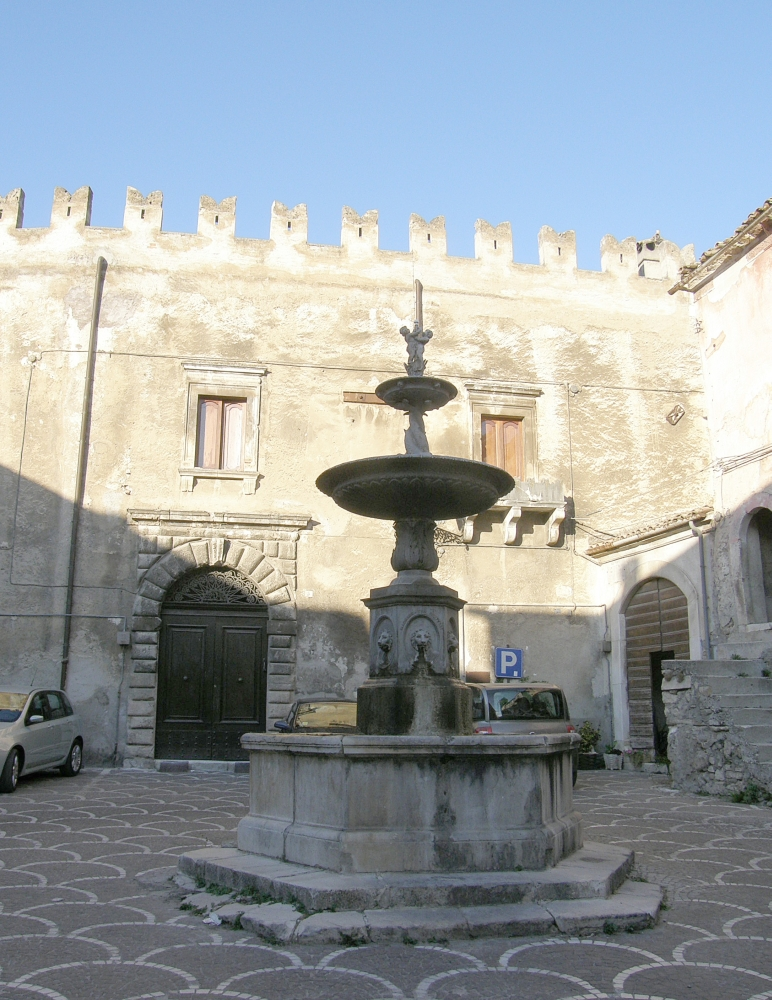
- Castle in Bussi sul Tirino

Site information
- Type: Castle

Location

Site history
- Built: 12th century

Castello Mediceo (Italian for Mediceo Castle) is a Middle Ages castle in Bussi sul Tirino, Province of Pescara (Abruzzo).

== History ==
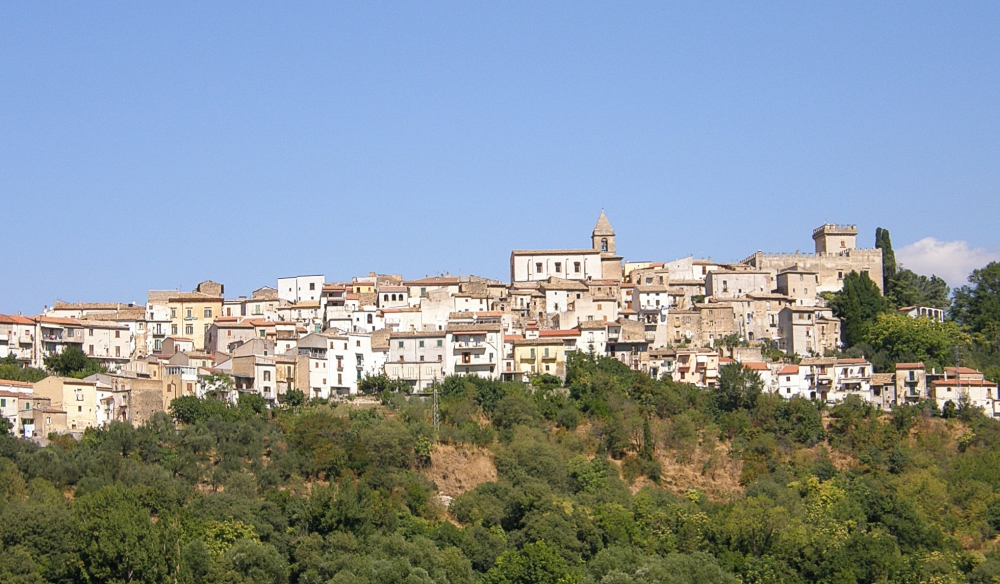
Panoramic view of Bussi, with the castle tower visible on the right

The origins of the castle are uncertain, though it was likely built by the d’Angiò family in the 12th century and associated with the monks of San Benedetto in Perillis, who held the small church of Santa Maria di Cartignano. However, a castle must have existed earlier, as it is mentioned in a 1092 donation by a dying Ugo, son of Giliberto, of Frankish origin, who bequeathed the monastery of San Benedetto in Perillis to the Diocese of Valva along with all his possessions, including some assets in the castle of Bussi. Its structure originally had the appearance of a Norman castle, with subsequent modifications by various owners over the centuries. The castle was owned by the Cantelmo dukes of Popoli when they gained full control of the Bussi fief. In the 16th century, the castle became the property of the Pietropaoli counts of Navelli and later of the de’ Medici family. The subsequent history is uncertain until the second half of the 18th century when, after the fall of the feudal system, the current noble family owners, originating from the de Sanctis barons of Rocca Casale, acquired the main structure, except for the outer walls incorporated into the town.

In the 20th century, the castle was renowned in the region for being one of the richest and best-preserved, thanks to restoration and complete renovation by Orazio de Sanctis in the early part of the century, including the reconstruction of the partially ruined tower after previous structural tampering and destructive events culminating in the German military occupation during World War II.

== Architecture ==
The building has a rectangular layout with an elegant internal courtyard. The prominent feature is the large rectangular tower with a battlemented roof (with partially artificial battlements) adorned with machicolations. The facade resembles that of a noble palace, as do the rest of the castle’s sides.

The interior maintains its original rooms and chambers, furnished with period pieces, most of which were replenished in the early 20th century following the aforementioned destructive events.
