= San Benedetto =

San Benedetto may refer to:

- Saint Benedict (c. 480-543/547), Italian saint
- Saint Benedict (disambiguation), a number of other Italian saints called San Benedetto (Saint Benedict)

== Places of Italy ==
- San Benedetto Belbo, a municipality in the Province of Cuneo, Piedmont
- San Benedetto dei Marsi, a municipality in the Province of L'Aquila, Abruzzo
- San Benedetto del Tronto, a municipality in the Province of Ascoli Piceno, Marche
- San Benedetto in Perillis, a municipality in the Province of L'Aquila, Abruzzo
- San Benedetto Po, a municipality in the Province of Mantua, Lombardy
- San Benedetto Ullano, a municipality in the Province of Cosenza, Calabria
- San Benedetto Val di Sambro, a municipality in the Province of Bologna, Emilia-Romagna
- San Benedetto in Alpe, a village in the municipality of Portico e San Benedetto, Province of Forlì-Cesena, Emilia-Romagna
- San Benedetto, a village in the municipality of Cascina, Province of Pisa, Tuscany

== Structures ==
- San Benedetto, Bologna, a church in central Bologna, Italy
- San Benedetto, Catania, a church in Catania, Italy
- San Benedetto, Florence, a church in Florence, Italy
- San Benedetto in Gottella, Lucca, a church in Lucca, Italy
- San Benedetto, Venice, also called San Beneto, a church in Venice, Italy
- San Benedetto monastery (Salerno), a former monastery, now part of the San Benedetto church in Salerno, Italy
- Teatro San Benedetto, a theatre in Venice, Italy

== Other uses ==
- Acqua Minerale San Benedetto, Italian beverage manufacturer
- San Benedetto Tennis Cup, a red clay court professional tennis tournament in San Benedetto del Tronto, Italy
