= Giuseppe Di Benedetto =

Italian cardiac surgeon (born 1946)

- Born: 8 January 1946 (age 80); Eboli, Italy
- Education: University of Perugia; University of Bergamo; University Hospital in Washington
- Known for: development of Minimally invasive cardiac surgery, first operation of ever of correction of Tetralogy of Fallot complications
- Medical career
- Profession: Surgeon
- Institutions: Ospedali Riuniti San Giovanni di Dio e Ruggi D'Aragona; Providence Hospital; Kinderklinik of Bonn; Great Ormond Street Hospital
- Sub-specialties: Cardiovascular surgery
- Research: Cardiac surgery techniques

Giuseppe Di Benedetto is an Italian cardiac surgeon born in Eboli on 8 January 1946, He holds the Italian national record for the use of carbon dioxide laser to perform revascularization trans-myocardial otherwise inoperable; specialized in congenital diseases of cardiovascular system, is one of the few surgeons in the world that practice successfully the surgery of aortic arch.

In particular, on 30 October 2014, for the first time in the world he has successfully performed a complex operation on a patient with tetralogy of Fallot who had had complications. Accomplishes still research of international interest such as the coronary surgery minimally invasive developed by him and on which he has held two major international conferences.

== Biography ==
Born 8 January 1946, in Eboli by Pasquale Di Benedetto and Carmela Botta, the youngest of seven children, Giuseppe Di Benedetto obtained a degree in Medicine to Perugia University with a thesis on "chemical carcinogenesis" with 110 and praise in 1972. He obtained a degree at the center of pediatric cardiac surgery of Bergamo directed by Lucio Parenzan which at the time was the largest center for pediatric cardiac surgery in the world.

In 1974 left for a Master in United States that lasted three years, during which up to 1975 was responsible for the research laboratory cardiovascular at the University Hospital in Washington and from 1976 to 1977 held the role of director of cardiovascular physiology at Providence Hospital in Seattle. After that Di Benedetto, will work from 1978 to 1981 as assistant of the professor Lucio Parenzan in Bergamo.

Returned from 'America married Liliana Verdoni, a journalist who come from Bergamo, and they had two daughters. In 1981 moved to London for six months at the "Great Ormond Street Hospital for sick children" which at that time was one of the most important centers of pediatric cardiac surgery of the world.

In 1981 returned Italy as the first aid of Professor Ugo Tesler to Hospital San Carlo of Potenza where he created the department of cardiac pediatric to prevent children from southern Italy were forced to travel to Bergamo to be operated. In 1984 left for Bonn in Germany where he became the director of the department of pediatric cardiac surgery hospital "Kinderklinik"; after a year he decided to come back to Italy at the San Carlo Hospital of Potenza with the same assignment. In 1990 won the chief contest held in Padua and in the 1991 began to serve in Salerno, where he established the department of cardiac surgery. On 19 December 1991, Di Benedetto had to operate in emergency, he made a substitution of thoracic aorta in a patient of 60 years with an fissured aneurysm without the aid of the machine for extracorporeal circulation which was necessary for the intervention; he performed a shunt subclavian-femoral that made possible the perfusion marrow. The operation was successful at the point that the patient was discharged after only ten days, and began the development of the new technique of the beating heart.

From 1993 began at full time the business of cardiac surgery at the Ospedale S. Giovanni di Dio e Ruggi d’Aragona Salerno. In 2000 he was invited by Professor Alan Carpentier of Paris European inauguration of the hospital "Georges Pompidou" where they had gathered the greatest exponents of cardiac surgery worldwide, including Christiaan Barnard and Denton Cooley.

=== The creation of a center of excellence ===
With the intensification of the activity and with increasing fame of the cardiac surgery of Salerno the waiting time for an intervention began really long; they need a new larger hospital with new technologies. Work began to build the "Tower of the Heart", but after repeated promises relating to the opening of the Tower were often disregarded, Giuseppe Di Benedetto clashed with the administrative commission to the point of threatening to abandon Salerno.

Everything turned out for the better when finally, on 24 September 2007 was inaugurated the Tower of cardiology of Ospedale S. Giovanni di Dio e Ruggi d’Aragona of Salerno. Professor Giuseppe Di Benedetto refused offers from a clinic in Switzerland and from a hospital of Roman to take over the "Tower of The Heart" one of the centers of excellence of Italian cardiac surgery. Prof. Giuseppe Di Benedetto was elected Chairperson of the National Association of Medical and Surgeon Cardiology ANMCO and under his direction the department of cardiac surgery won the bronze medal in the S.T.I.C.H. "Surgical Treatment of Ischemic Failure" which was attended by 96 centers around the world.

=== The important goals ===
During years a lot of new innovative surgical techniques were developed by Di Benedetto and his associates. The most important are: myocardial revascularization which involves only the use of arterial ducts; the surgical technique of beating heart (I.e. without the use of machines for extracorporeal circulation) that allows a percentage of revascularization over 90%; the development of minimally invasive surgery related to both coronary and valves (on which he organized two international conferences in 1997 and 1998) and development of conservation valves techniques in collaboration with the American professor Tirone David.

In 1995 performed a rare surgery correction known as isolated congenital inversion atrial in situs inversus on a girl of only five days. As one of the few surgeon in the world to have successfully performed this surgery, he collaborated to an article annuals of surgery chest of 1995.

In 1996 the use for the first time in Italy of carbon dioxide laser for trans-myocardial revascularization, otherwise impossible, Di Benedetto be the focus of all the national television networks.

On 31 July 2009, worked together with Luciano Brigante a patient with giant aneurysm of the internal left carotid artery. This type of intervention had been carried out only in three other centers in the world that Phoenix, Helsinki and Milan.

In 2011 was one of the few in Europe to have performed two successful interventions of replacement of aortic valves with prosthesis of the last generation that do not require sutures. On 6 December 2010, put at the disposal of 'Italian Association against leukemia-lymphoma and myeloma on the third floor of the Tower of Cardiology allowing the establishment of the Salerno AIL .

On 30 October 2014 Giuseppe Di Benedetto has performed for the first time in the world a complicated surgery correction of complications due to the tetralogy of Fallot. Domenico Bisaccia student Medicine of the fourth year at the 'University of Salerno had a aneurysm of the aortic arch ascending and a' valvular insufficiency of both aortic valve and pulmonary valve. During only an intervention Di Benedetto was able to remove the aneurysm, implant the aortic valve using the patient's own tissues and replace the pulmonary valve with a trans ventricular valve of last generation, which does not require sutures, never been used for this purpose.

== International co-operations ==
Di Benedetto cooperates with leading international cardiac surgeons. In 1995 there was the twinning Salerno - Tokyo for Research and Professor Hisayoshi Suma was a guest in Salerno at the Tower Cardiological to teach the new heart surgery technique he had developed.

Few years later with Professor Alan Carpentier of the Parisian school there was an agreement for the constant exchange of professional experiences; Professor Kim A. Eagle, famous researcher American, Di Benedetto asked to write a chapter on his book "Aortic dissection and related syndromes" dedicated to aortic dissection.

== Main publications ==
- P. Masiello, G. Mastrogiovanni, S. Jesu, A. Panza, F. Triumbari, G. Di Benedetto: Massive Pulmonary embolism 3 hours after cardiopulmonary bypass. Texas Heart Institute Journal, vo. 21: 314–6, 1994.
- A.Panza, P. Masiello, S. Jesu, F. Triumbari, A. Gigantino, L. Di Leo, G. Di Benedetto: Idiopathic isolated coronary ostial stenosis: a rare lesion with Particular clinical and surgical implications. Thoracic Cardiovascular Surgeon, vol. 43, no. 1, pages 40–43, 1995.
- P. Masiello, A. Panza, E. Morena, A. Marotta, G. Bellieni, G. Di Benedetto: Total anomalous pulmonary venous connection with left intact atrial septum: surgical treatment of a rare case. European Journal of Cardio-Thoracic Surgery, Vol. 9, pages 102–103, 1995.
- P. Masiello, A. Panza, G. Di Benedetto: The myocardial revascularization with CO_{2} laser. Archives of Thoracic and Cardiovascular Surgery, vol. XVIII, 4: 182, 1996
- P. Masiello, E. Coscioni, A Panza, G. Mastrogiovanni, G. Di Benedetto: Transmyocardial laser revascularization. Gastroenterology International, vol. 10, supplement 3: 77–8, 1997
- G. Benedict, P. Masiello, A. Panza: The minimally invasive valve surgery. Cardiac Systems, year V, no. 2: 22–5, 1998
- P. Masiello, E. Coscioni, A. Panza, F.Triumbari, G. Preziosi, G. Di Benedetto: Surgical results of aortic valve replacement via partial upper sternotomy: comparison with median sternotomy. Journal of Cardiovascular Surgery 10 (4): 333-8 2002
- S. Trimarchi, T. Myrmel, A. Panza, G. Di Benedetto, V. Scions: Vascular surgical options (Chapter Book) Aortic Dissection and Related Syndromes, Springer, USA, 2007
- A. Panza, G. Di Benedetto (co-investigators). Diagnosis of Acute Aortic Dissection by D-Dimer: The International Registry of Acute Aortic Dissection substudy on Biomarkers (IRAD-Bio) Experience. Circulation 119, 2702–2707, 2009
- A. Panza, R. Leone, A. Longobardi, P. Masiello, A. Alfano, G. Mastrogiovanni, F. Cafarelli, S. Jesu, G. Di Benedetto. Eight-year experience in aortic valve sparing aortic root reimplantation for aneurysms. European Heart Journal 30 (Suppl.); 977, 2009
- R. Citro, A. Panza, G. Bottiglieri, R. Leone, G. Provence, G. Gregory, G. Di Benedetto, E. Bossone. Surgical treatment of impending paradoxical embolization associated with pulmonary embolism in a patient with factor V Leiden of heterozygosis. Journal of Cardiovascular Medicine. 2011.

== See also ==
- Pediatrics
- Cardiology
- Salerno
- Cardiac surgeon
