= Palazzo Bernardini =

Coordinates: 43.842579°N 10.505628°E

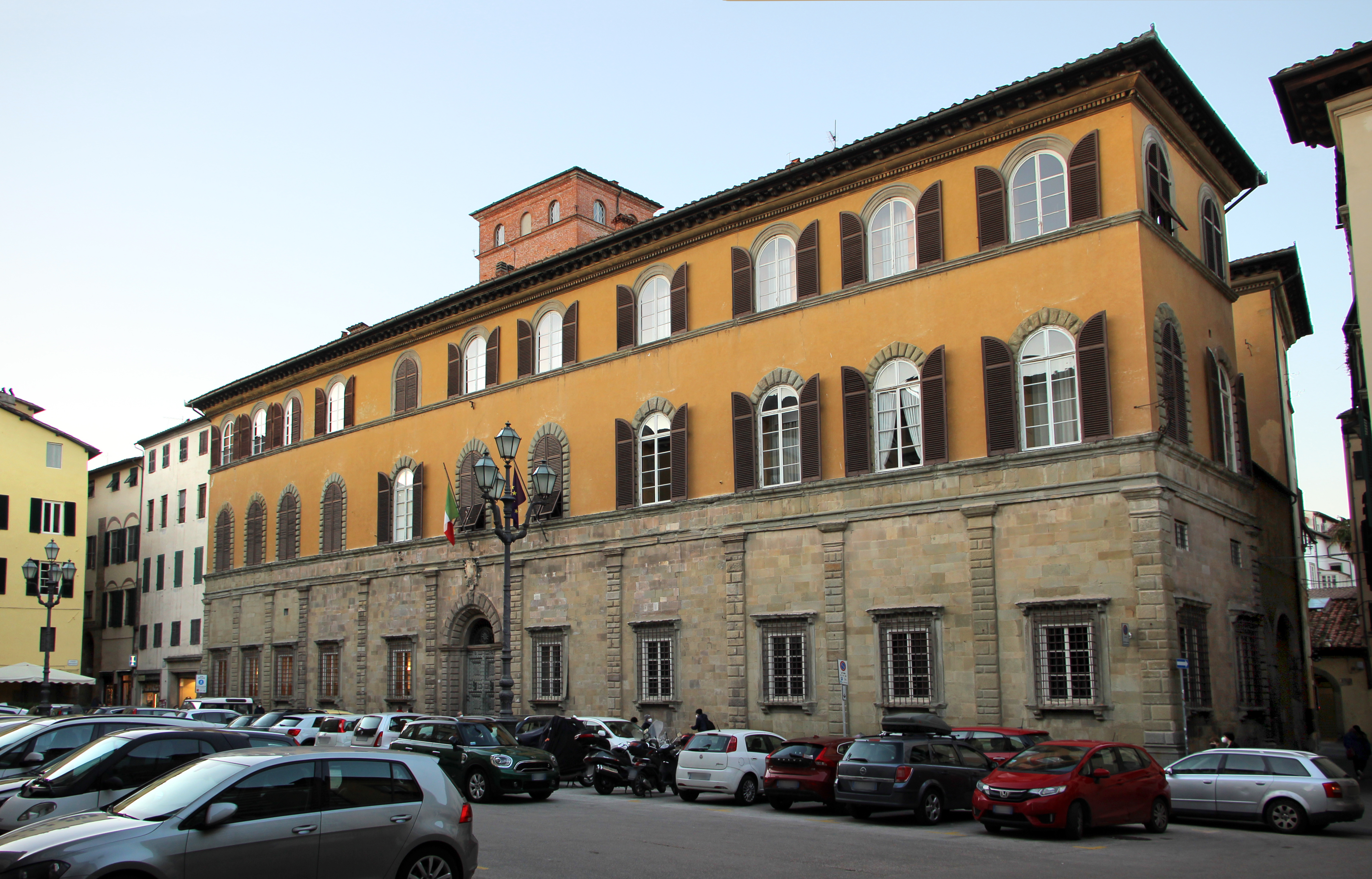
Palazzo Bernardini

The Palazzo Bernardini is a Renaissance palace located on the Piazza Bernardini, diagonal from the church of San Benedetto in Gotella in central Lucca, region of Tuscany, Italy.

== History ==
Erected starting 1512 for the Marchese Bernardini by the 16th-century architect Nicolao Civitali. The ground floor has rusticated stone face interrupted by doric stone pilasters. The piano nobile windows have wooden shutters.

Among the curiosity of the palace is the missing stone on the ground floor facade above the third window from the left. A legend spun about the missing stone is that it is the pietra del diavolo (Devil's stone). Legends hold that this spot once held a wall with a painted icon of the Virgin Mary, and that a rock at this point, kept falling out. This was interpreted as a divine sign, and the block was omitted.
