= San Benedetto in Gottella, Lucca =

Church building in Lucca, Italy

Coordinates: 43.842395°N 10.506045°E

San Benedetto in Gottella is a Romanesque-style, Roman Catholic church located on piazza Bernardin in Lucca, region of Tuscany, Italy. The church is located on Piazza Bernardini, near the Palazzo Bernardini, on the route of the ancient decumanus maximus of Lucca.

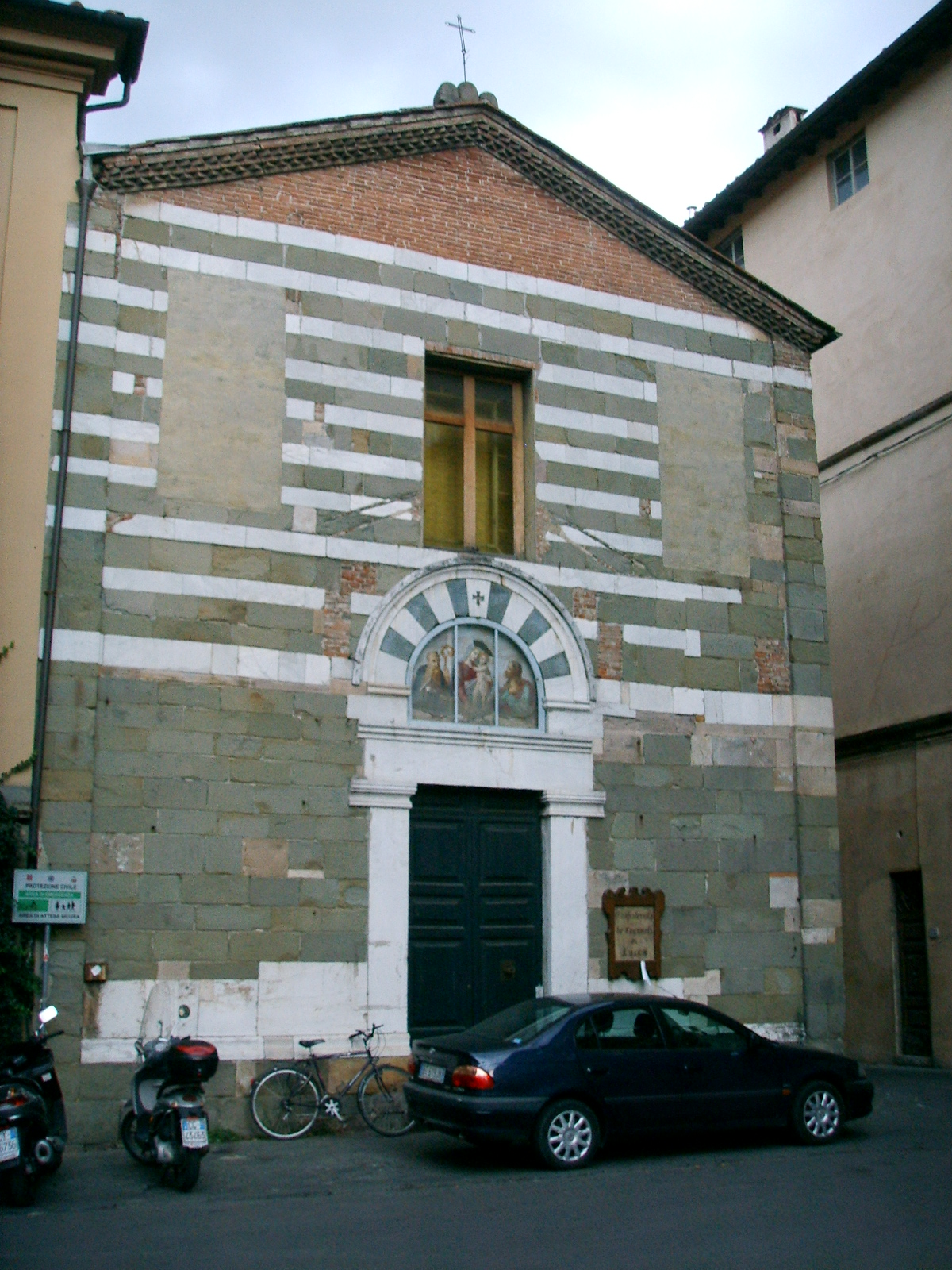
Facade of church

== History ==
A church at the site was present by tenth century, but reconstructed in the 13th-century. The walls contain a mosaic of fragments from the earlier church. The façade is a mixture of white limestone and darker tan sandstones, formed by blocks of different size, with a round portal entrance. Above the entrance is a painted lunette. In 1817, the church became the home for the confraternity of carpenters.

Among the works of art are an altarpiece depicting the Madonna and Child with Saints Benedetto e Margherita by Benedetto Brandimarte.
