= Bussi sul Tirino =

- Comune
- Comune di Bussi sul Tirino
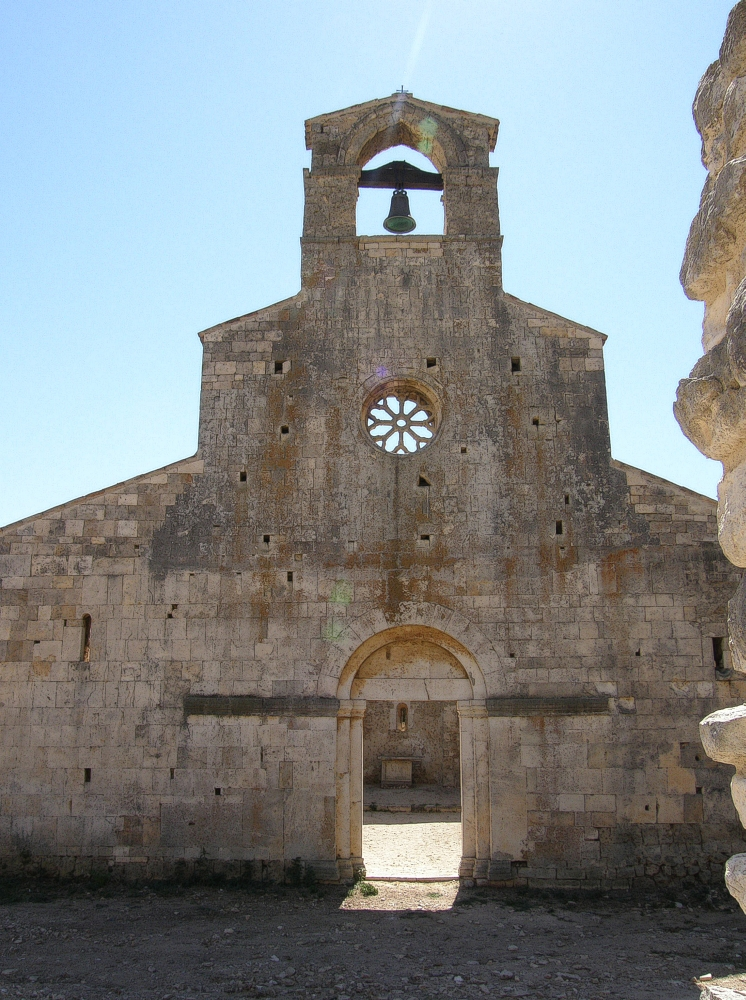
- Santa Maria in Cartiganano

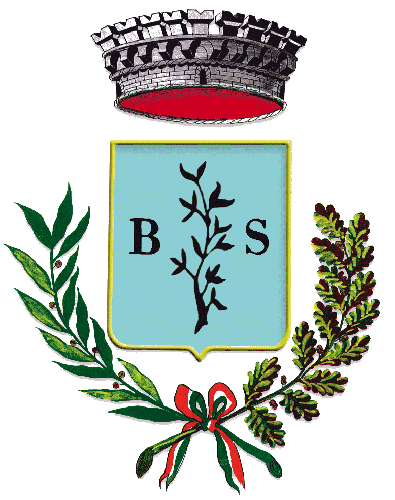
- Coat of arms

- Location within Italy Location within Abruzzo
- Coordinates: 42°12′N 13°49′E
- Country: Italy
- Region: Abruzzo
- Province: Pescara (PE)
- Frazioni: Bussi Officine

Government
  - Mayor: Salvatore Lagatta (since 2023) (FdI)

Area
  - Total: 25.19 km^{2} (9.73 sq mi)
- Elevation: 344 m (1,129 ft)

Population (11 May 2024)
  - Total: 2,263
  - Density: 89.84/km^{2} (232.7/sq mi)
- Demonym: Bussesi
- Time zone: UTC+1 (CET)
  - Summer (DST): UTC+2 (CEST)
- Postal code: 65022
- Dialing code: 085
- Patron saint: San Biagio
- Website: Official website

Bussi sul Tirino (Abruzzese: B'Bùsce) is a comune and town in the province of Pescara in the Abruzzo region of Italy. It is located in the Gran Sasso e Monti della Laga National Park.

== See also ==
- Castello Mediceo
