= Enzo Benedetto =

Italian painter

Enzo Benedetto (10 November 1905 - 27 May 1993) was an Italian painter, associated with Futurism.
