= Alessandro Di Benedetto =

French offshore sailor and navigator (born 1981)

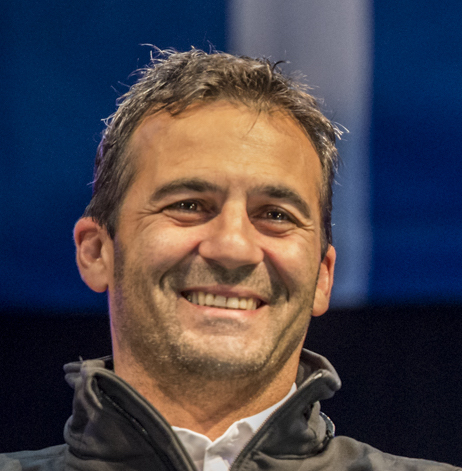

Personal information
- Nationality: French
- Born: 5 January 1981 (age 45) Rome

Sailing career
- Sport: Sailing

Alessandro Di Benedetto is an Italian-French sailor born on 5 January 1981 in Rome, Italy.

He is known for his solo sailings of the Atlantic (2002) and Pacific (2006) on sports catamarans (5.96 m), and for his solo, non-stop and unassisted round-the-world trip on a 6.50-metre Mini sailboat (2009-2010) and his participation in the 2012-2013 Vendee Globe finishing 11th.

== Personal life ==
He is a geologist by training and a graduate from the University of Palermo in Italy.

== Gallery ==
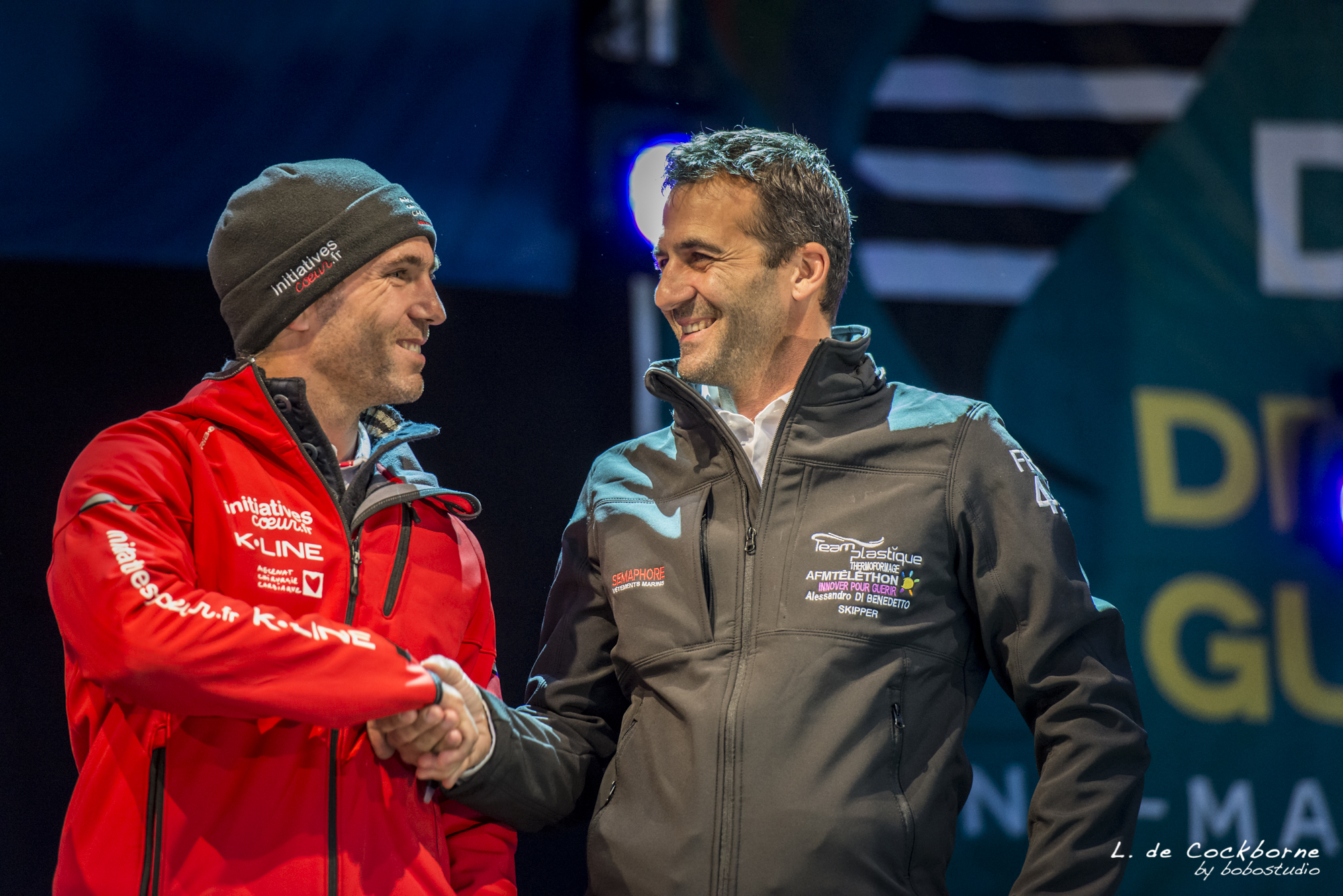

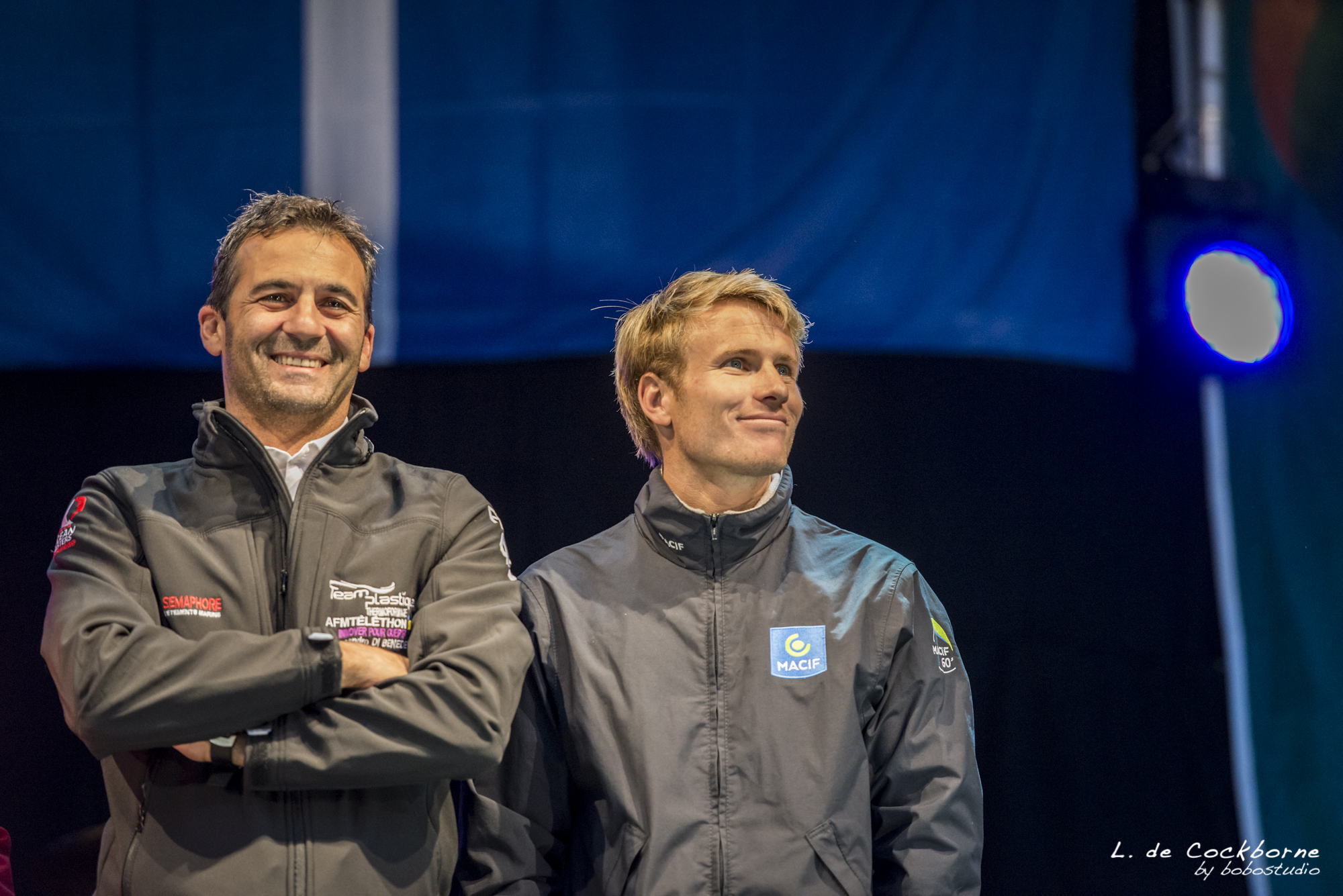

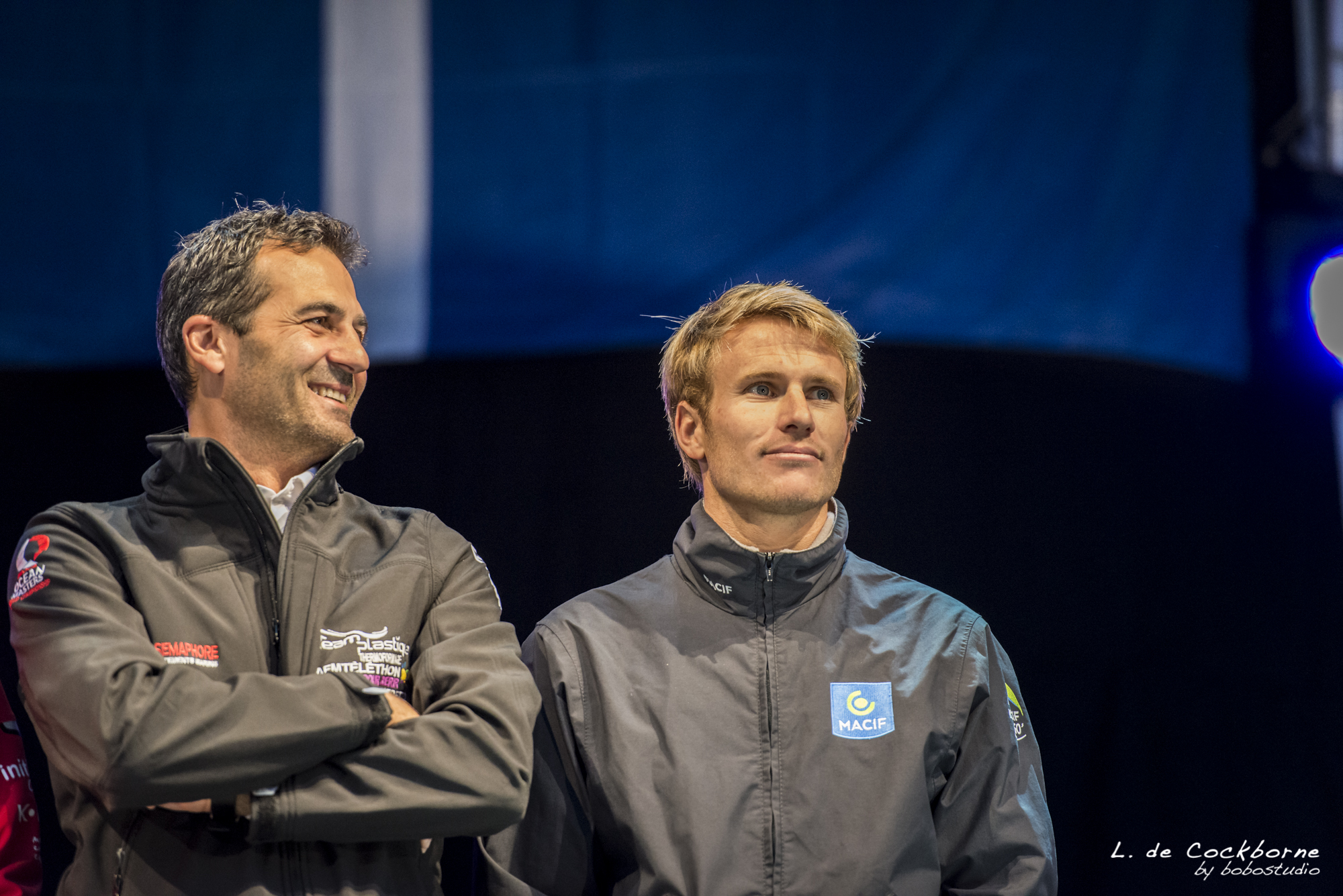

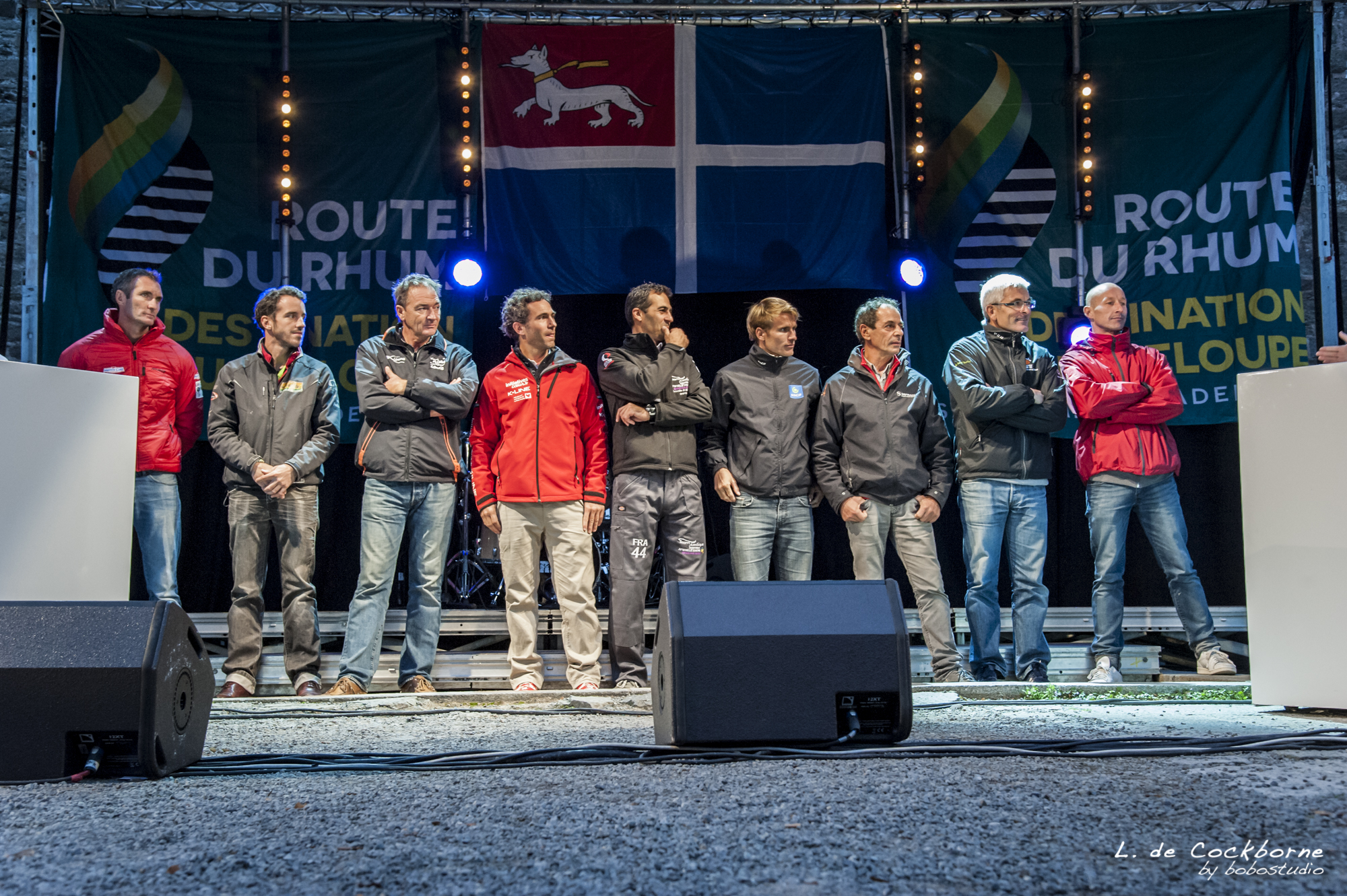

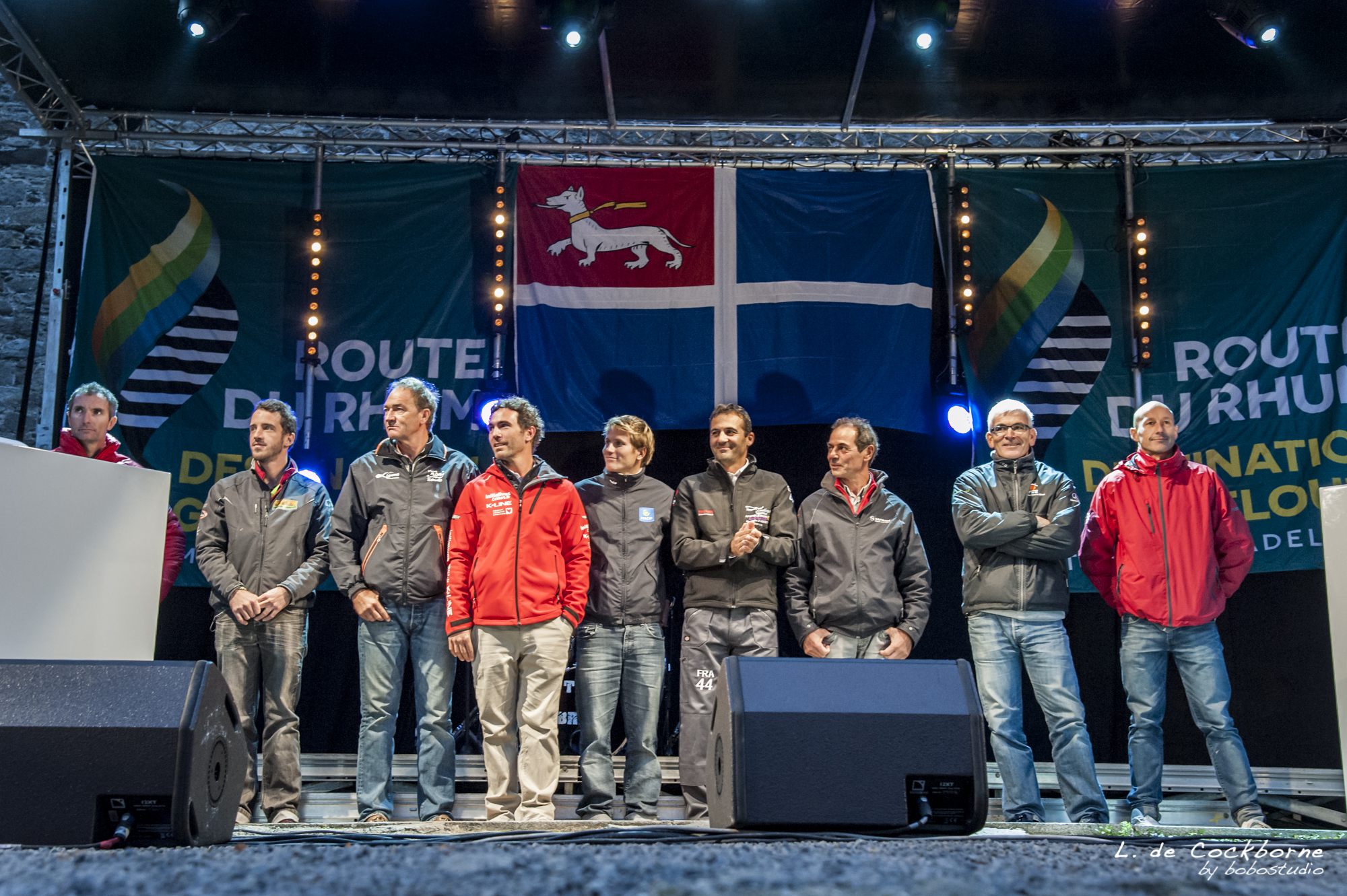

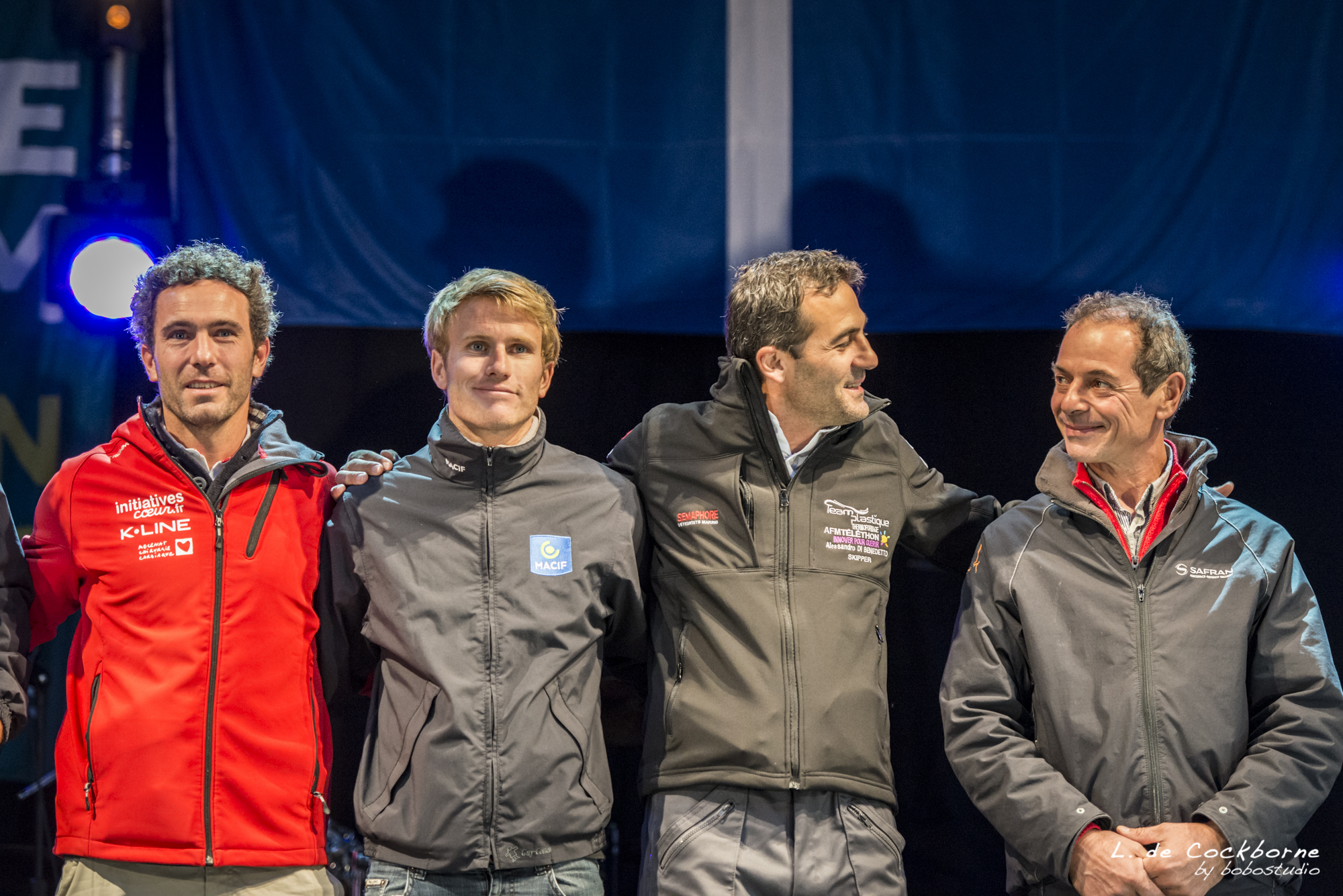

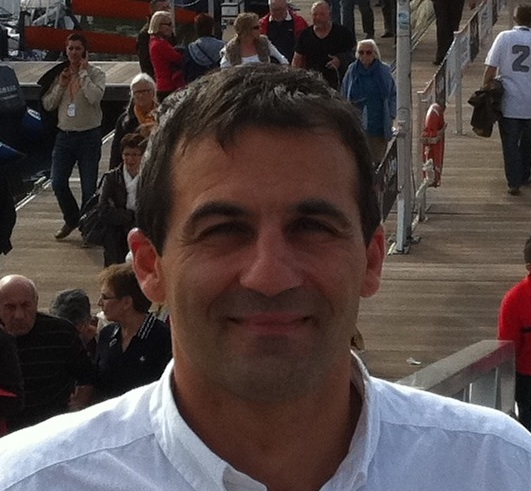

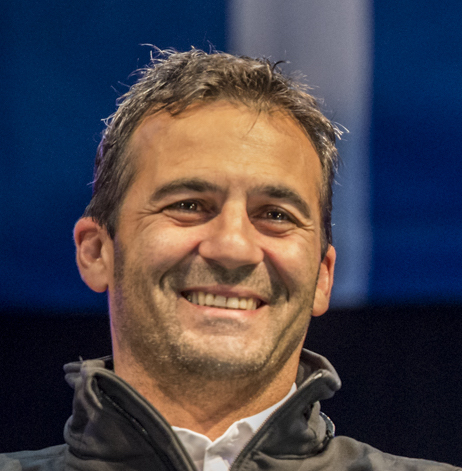

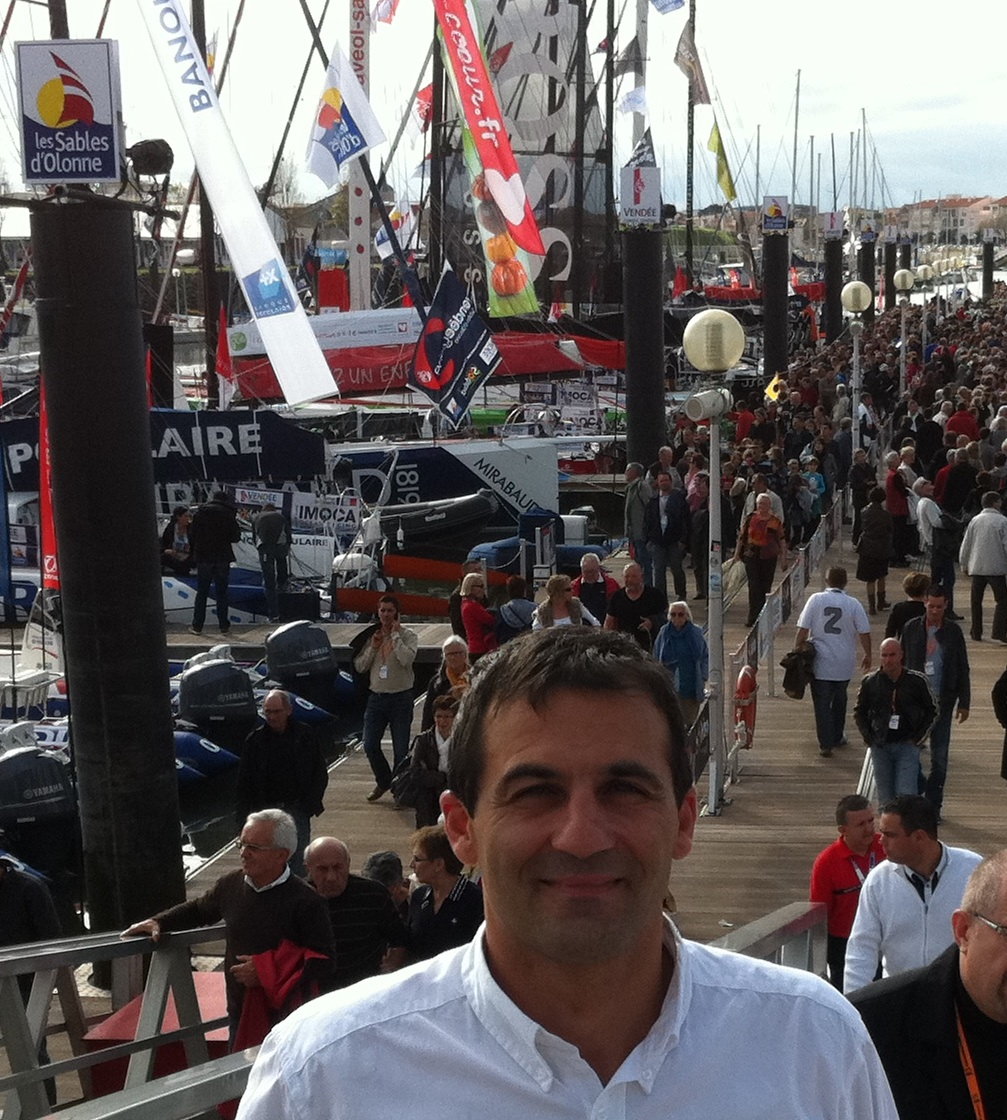

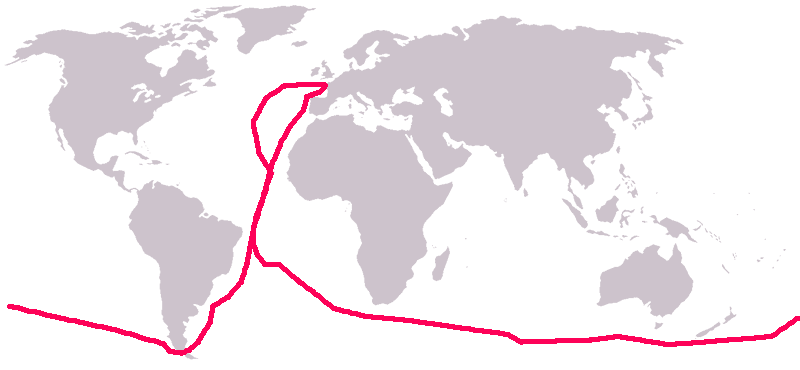

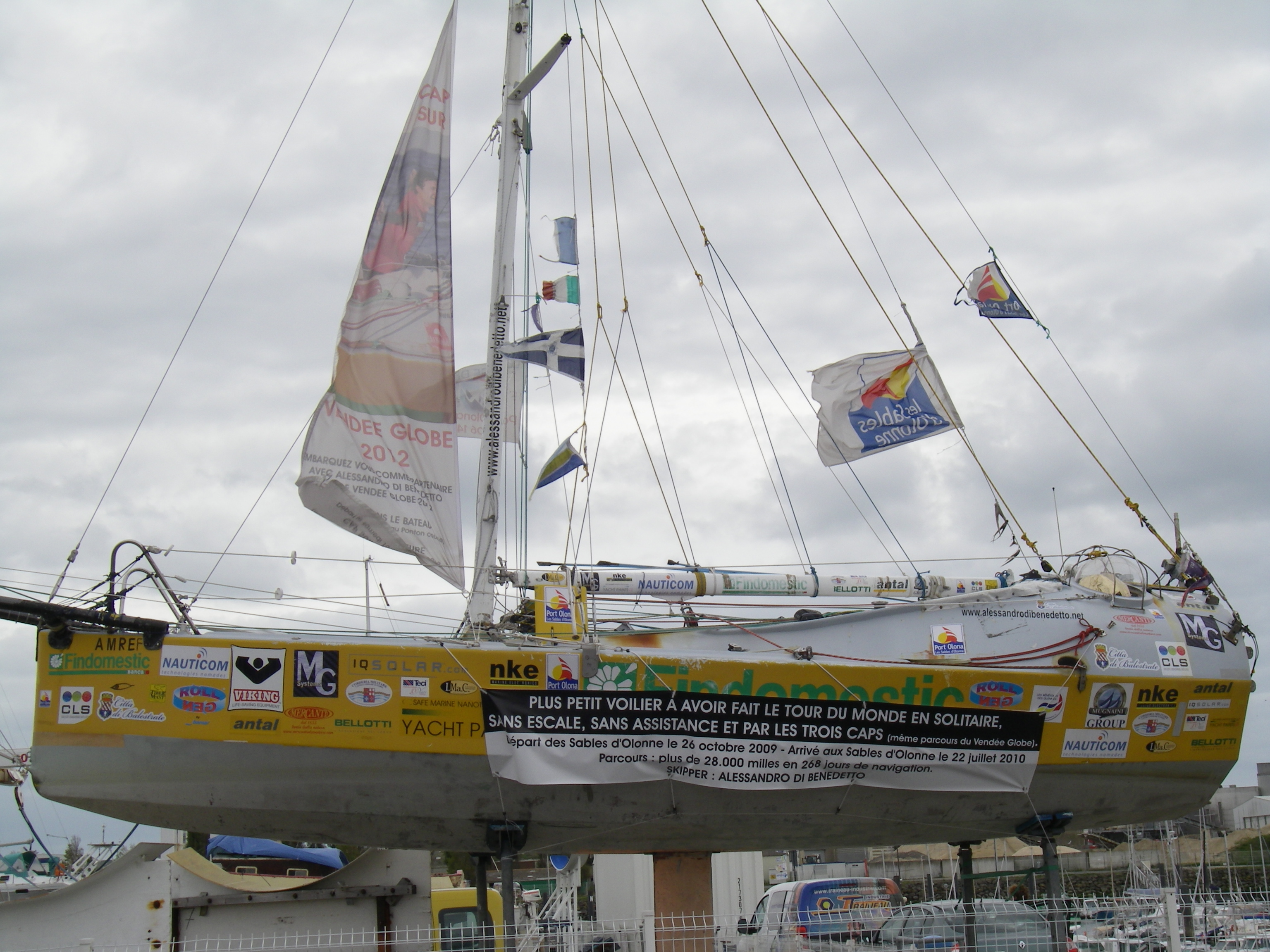

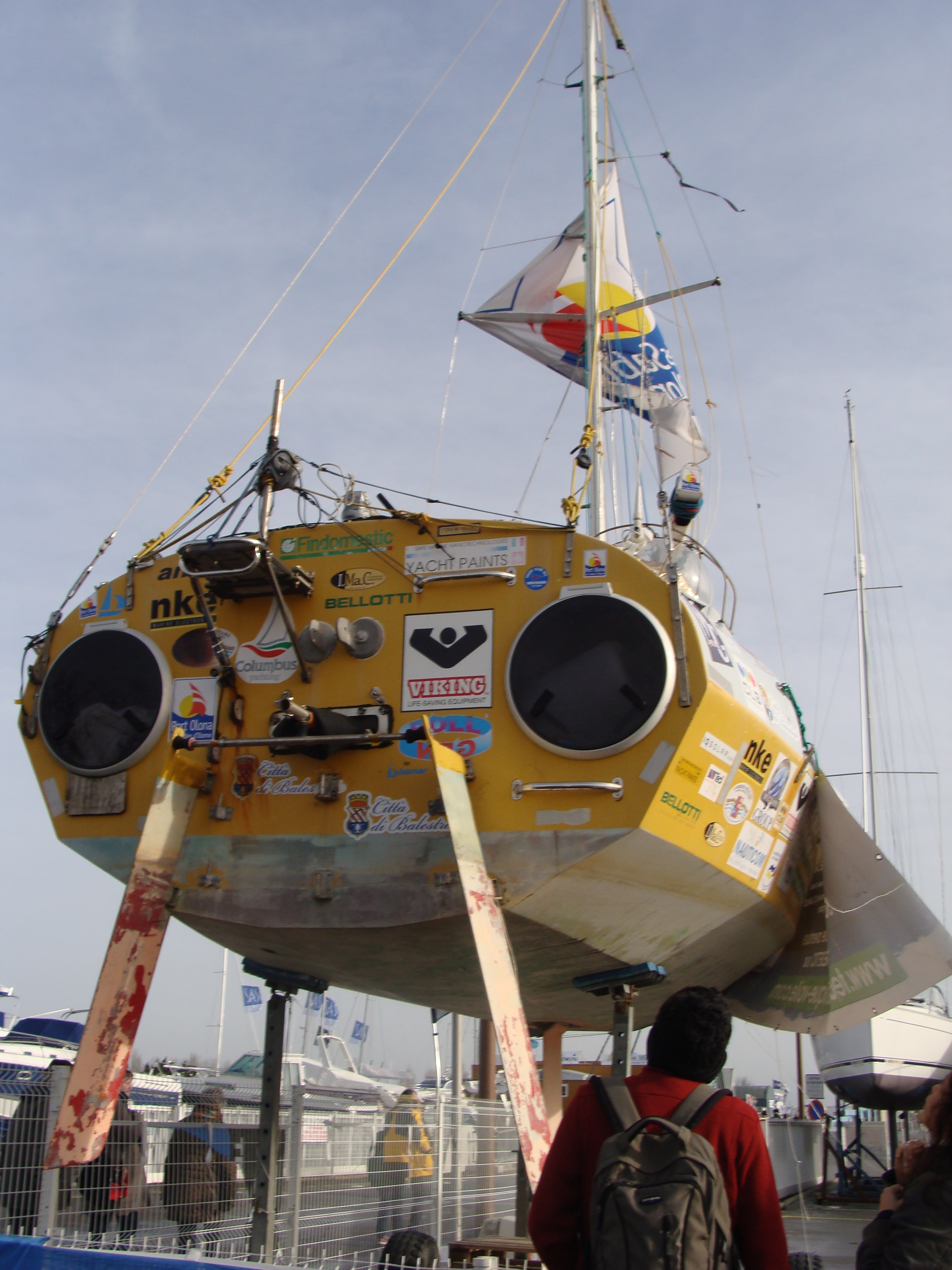

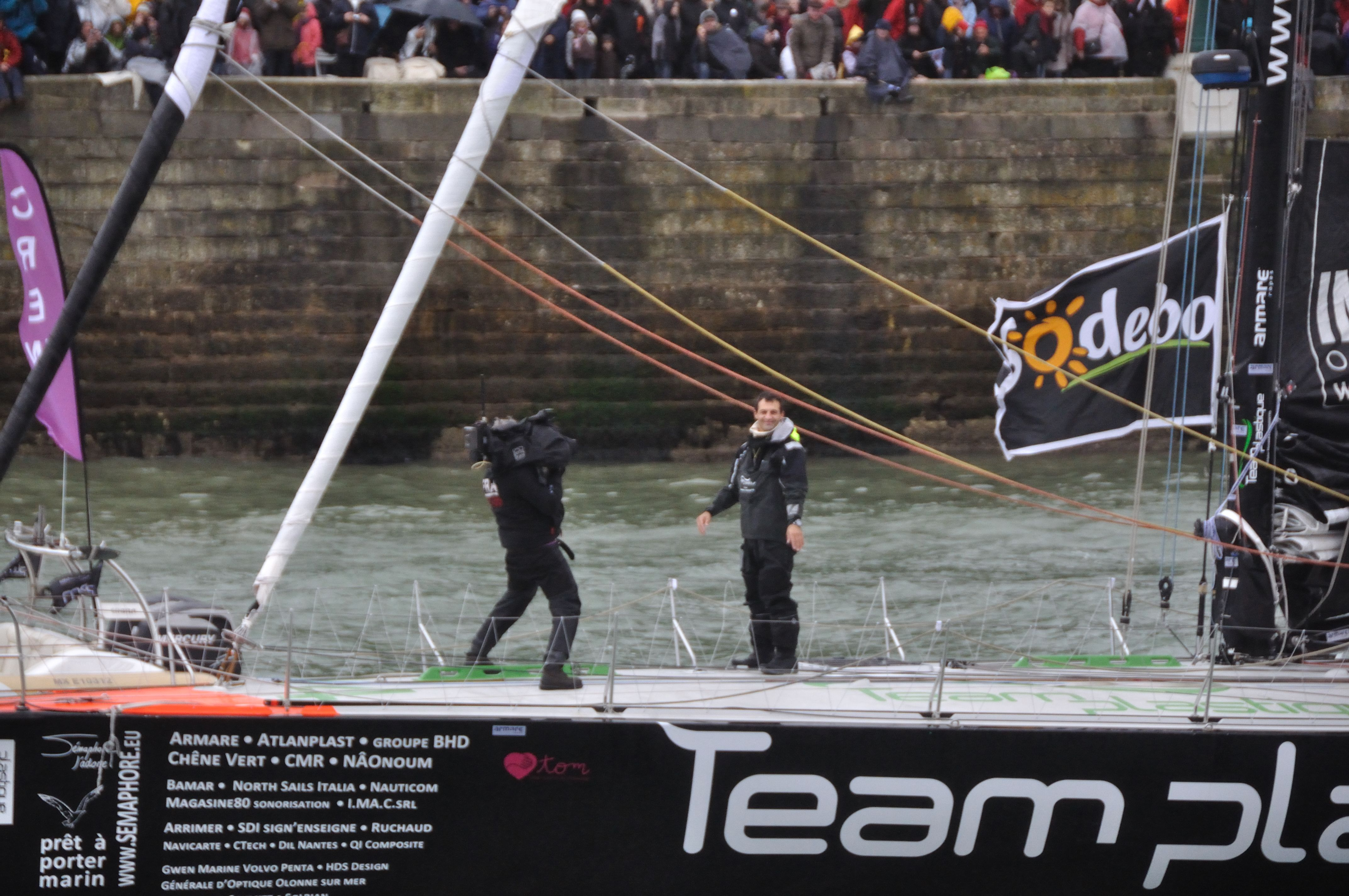

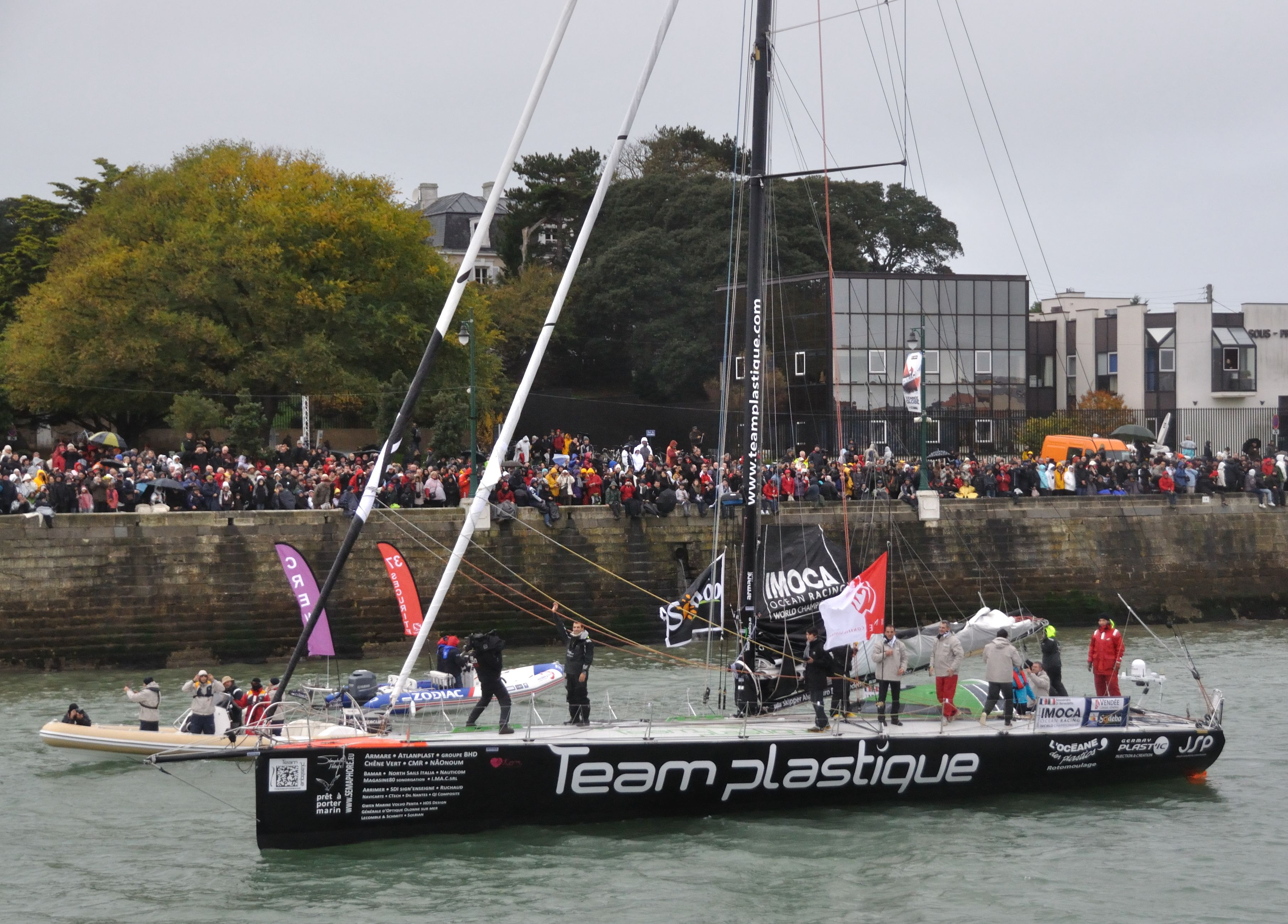

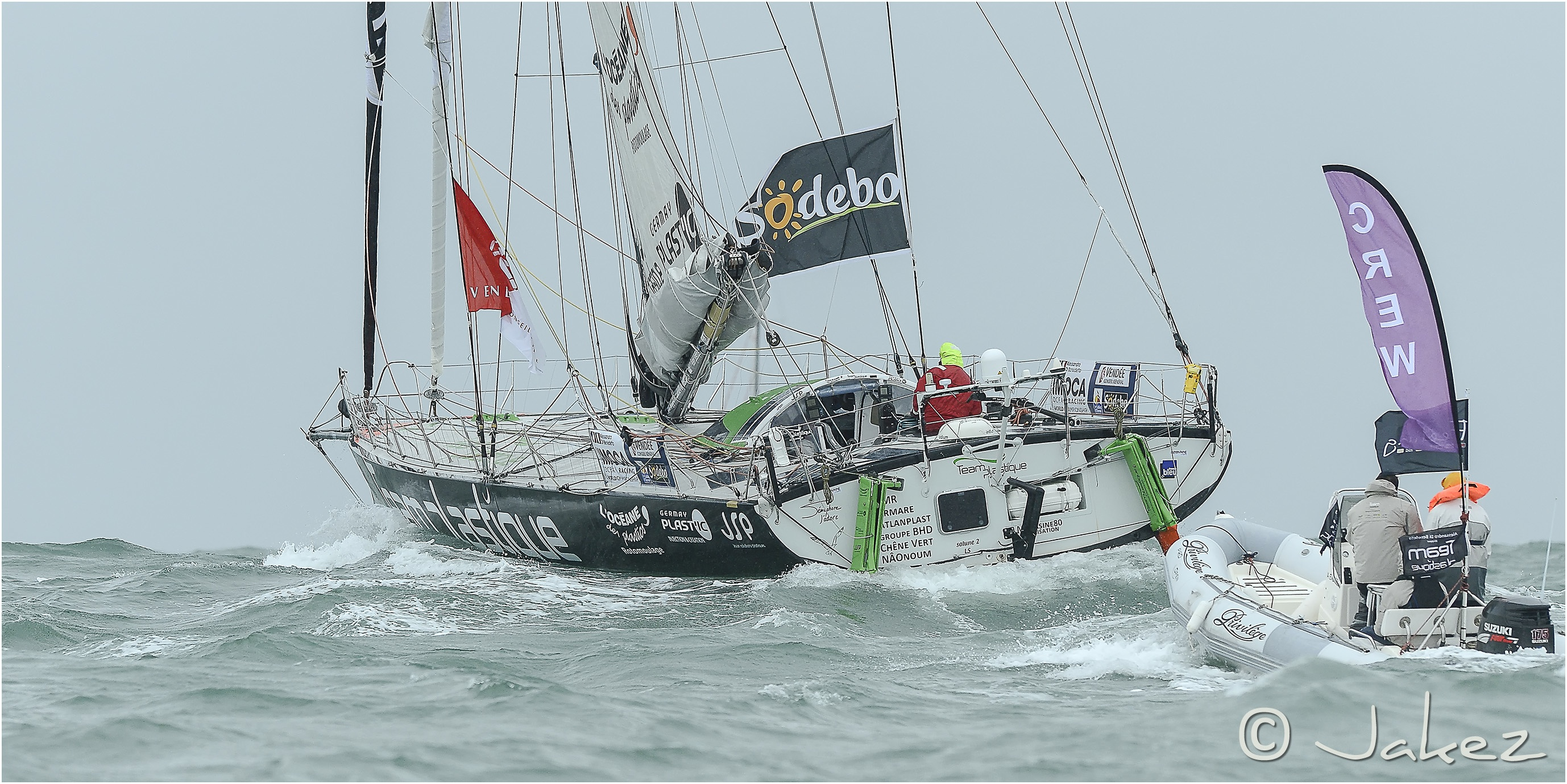

== Publications ==
- My adventure on Everest sailing. The Vendée Globe, 2013.
- Around the world on a 6.50 metre sailboat, Auto-edition, 2010.
- TANDOKU, Publisher: MAGENES, Milan, 2007.
- Oltre l'Oceano, Publisher: MAGENES, Milan, 2006.
- L'Atlantico senza riparo, Publisher: NUTRIMENTI, Rome, Italy, 2004.
- Solo: The Incredible Crossing, Marine Anchor Editions, Louviers (France), 2004
