= Francesco Dibenedetto =

Italian football manager (1941–2021)

Personal information
- Date of birth: 10 March 1941
- Place of birth: Altamura, Italy
- Date of death: 6 August 2021 (aged 80)
- Place of death: Altamura, Italy

Managerial career
- Years: Team
- Matera
- Casarano
- Fasano
- Bisceglie
- Altamura

Francesco Dibenedetto (10 March 1941 – 6 August 2021) was an Italian football manager. He won promotion to Serie B with Matera. He also managed Casarano, Fasano, Bisceglie and Altamura.
