= Ostial disease =

- Specialty: Cardiology

Ostial disease, namely coronary ostial stenosis, is the occlusion of coronary ostium. Causing factors include atherosclerosis, syphilis, Kawasaki disease, and Takayasu's arteritis, etc.
