= Benedetto Accolti =

Benedetto Accolti is the name of:

- Benedetto Accolti the Elder (1415–1464), Italian jurist and historian
- Benedetto Accolti the Younger (1497–1549), Italian cardinal

== See also ==
- Accolti (surname)
