= Maria Domenica Di Benedetto =

Italian electrical engineer and control theorist

Maria Domenica Di Benedetto (born 1953) is an Italian electrical engineer and control theorist whose interests include the control of hybrid systems, embedded control systems, automotive engine control, and aerospace flight control. She is Professor Emeritus of Automatic Control at the University of L'Aquila, former president of the European Embedded Control Institute, and the former president of the Italian Society of researchers in Automatic Control.

She should be distinguished from Maria-Gabriella Di Benedetto, another Italian electrical engineer with similar career details.

== Education and career ==
Di Benedetto earned a master's degree (Dr. Ing.) at Sapienza University of Rome in 1976. She earned a French doctorate of engineering at Paris-Sud University in 1981 and a state doctorate there in 1987.

She worked as a research engineer for IBM in Paris and Rome from 1979 to 1983, as an assistant professor at Sapienza University from 1983 to 1987, as an associate professor at the Parthenope University of Naples (then called the Istituto Universitario Navale) from 1987 to 1990, and again at Sapienza University from 1990 to 1993. She joined the Department of Information Engineering at the University of L'Aquila as Professor of Automatic Control in 1994. At L'Aquila, she directs the Center of Excellence for Research in Design methodologies of Embedded controllers, Wireless interconnect and Systems-on-chip (DEWS).

She has headed the European Embedded Control Institute (EECI) since 2009, and served as president of the Italian Society of researchers in Automatic Control (SIDRA) from 2013 to 2019.

== Book ==
With Elena De Santis, Di Benedetto is the coauthor of the book Observability of Hybrid Dynamical Systems (Springer, 2023).

== Recognition ==
Di Benedetto was named an IEEE Fellow in the class of 2002, affiliated with the IEEE Control Systems Society, "for contributions to the theory of nonlinear and hybrid control system design". She was named a Fellow of the International Federation of Automatic Control in 2019, "for contributions to nonlinear and hybrid system theory and leadership in control research and education".
