= Maria-Gabriella Di Benedetto =

Italian electrical, audio, and communications engineer

Maria-Gabriella Di Benedetto (born 1958) is an Italian electrical, audio, and communications engineer, whose research involves speech processing, wireless communication, and ultra-wideband signal processing. She is a professor of electrical engineering at Sapienza University of Rome.

She should be distinguished from Maria Domenica Di Benedetto, another Italian electrical engineer with similar career details.

== Education and career ==
M.-G. Di Benedetto earned a laurea from Sapienza University of Rome in 1981, and completed her PhD in telecommunications there in 1987. After postdoctoral research at Selenia Spazio and a visiting position at the University of Perugia, she became an associate professor at Paris-Sud University in 1990 before returning to Sapienza University as an associate professor there in 1991. She also held a position as associate professor at the University of L'Aquila for 1995–1996, and has been a full professor of telecommunications at Sapienza University since 2000.

She visited the University of California, Berkeley in 1994 as John H. MacKay, Jr., Professor of Electrical Engineering, and was a visitor to the Radcliffe Institute for Advanced Study at Harvard University for 2019–2020, where she was the William Bentinck-Smith Fellow.

She is a Research Affiliate of the Massachusetts Institute of Technology (MIT), Cambridge, MA.

== Book ==
M.-G. Di Benedetto is a coauthor of the book Understanding Ultra Wide Band Radio Fundamentals (with Guerino Giancola, Prentice-Hall, 2004). She is also an editor of several edited volumes on ultra wide band radio and speech processing.

== Recognition ==
M.-G. Di Benedetto was named an IEEE Fellow, associated with the IEEE Communications Society, in the 2016 class of fellows, "for contributions to impulse-radio ultra wideband and cognitive networks for wireless communications".

In 2019 she was named Fellow of the Radcliffe Institute for Advanced Study at Harvard University.
