= San Benedetto in Perillis =

- Comune
- Comune di San Benedetto in Perillis
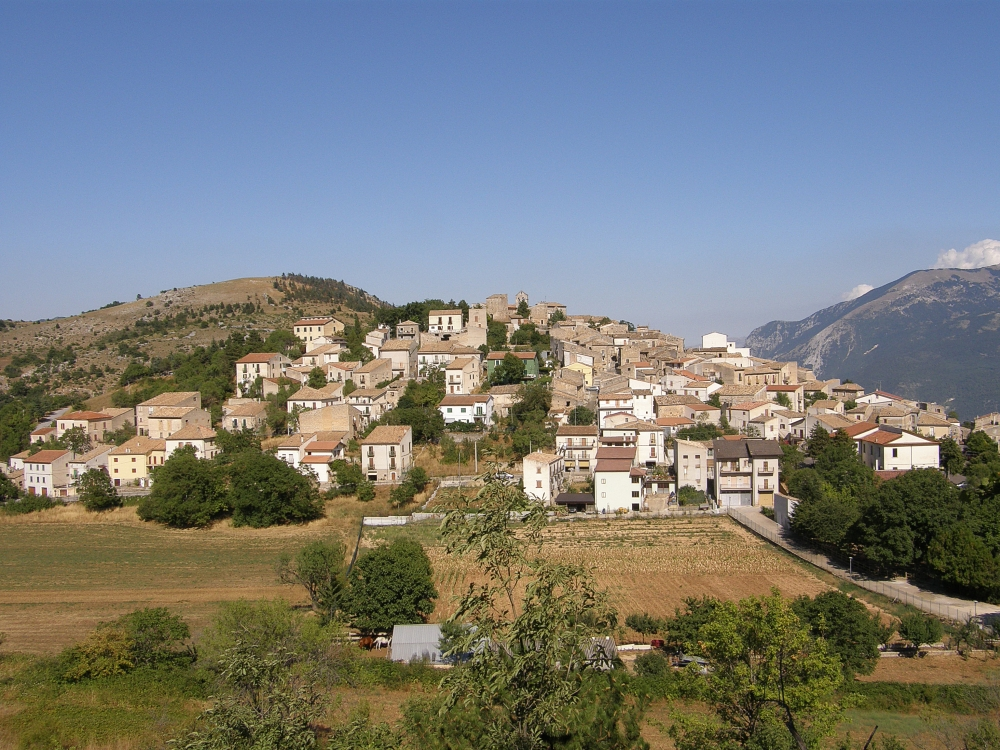

- Coat of arms

- Location within Italy Location within Abruzzo
- Coordinates: 42°11′7″N 13°46′18″E
- Country: Italy
- Region: Abruzzo
- Province: Province of L'Aquila (AQ)

Government
  - Mayor: Laura D'Abrizio (lista civica Uniti per San Benedetto) from 21-9-2020

Area
  - Total: 19.08 km^{2} (7.37 sq mi)
- Elevation: 878 m (2,881 ft)

Population (31 December 2010)
  - Total: 128
  - Density: 6.71/km^{2} (17.4/sq mi)
- Demonym: Sambenedettini
- Time zone: UTC+1 (CET)
  - Summer (DST): UTC+2 (CEST)
- Postal code: 67020
- Dialing code: 0862
- Patron saint: Saint Benedict
- Saint day: March 31

San Benedetto in Perillis is a town and comune in the province of L'Aquila, Abruzzo, central Italy. The town is 43 kilometres (27 mi) from the regional capital, L'Aquila.

== History ==
In the High Middle Ages, a monastery was built here to serve the peasantry of L'Aquila. Charles V of Spain later granted the lands around the town to one of the captains of his army. Eventually, the Caracciolo family took control of the area, being replaced in the 18th century by the Celestine Fathers of L'Aquila.

== Main sights ==
- Church of S. Benedict
- Church of S. Maria delle Grazie

== In popular culture ==
The movie Ladyhawke (1985) was filmed in the monastery of San Benedetto.

== Gallery ==
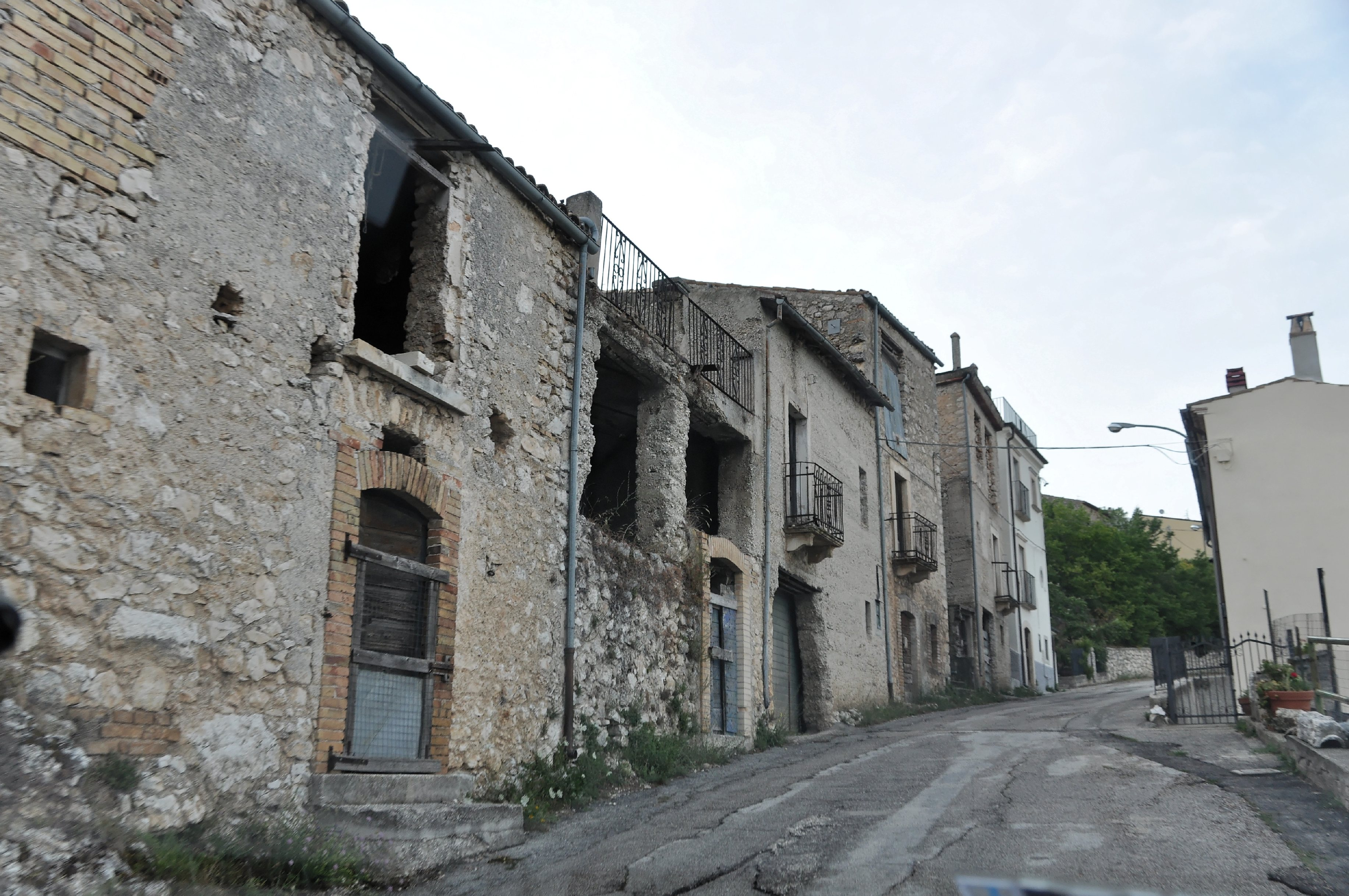
San Benedetto in Perillis (2013)

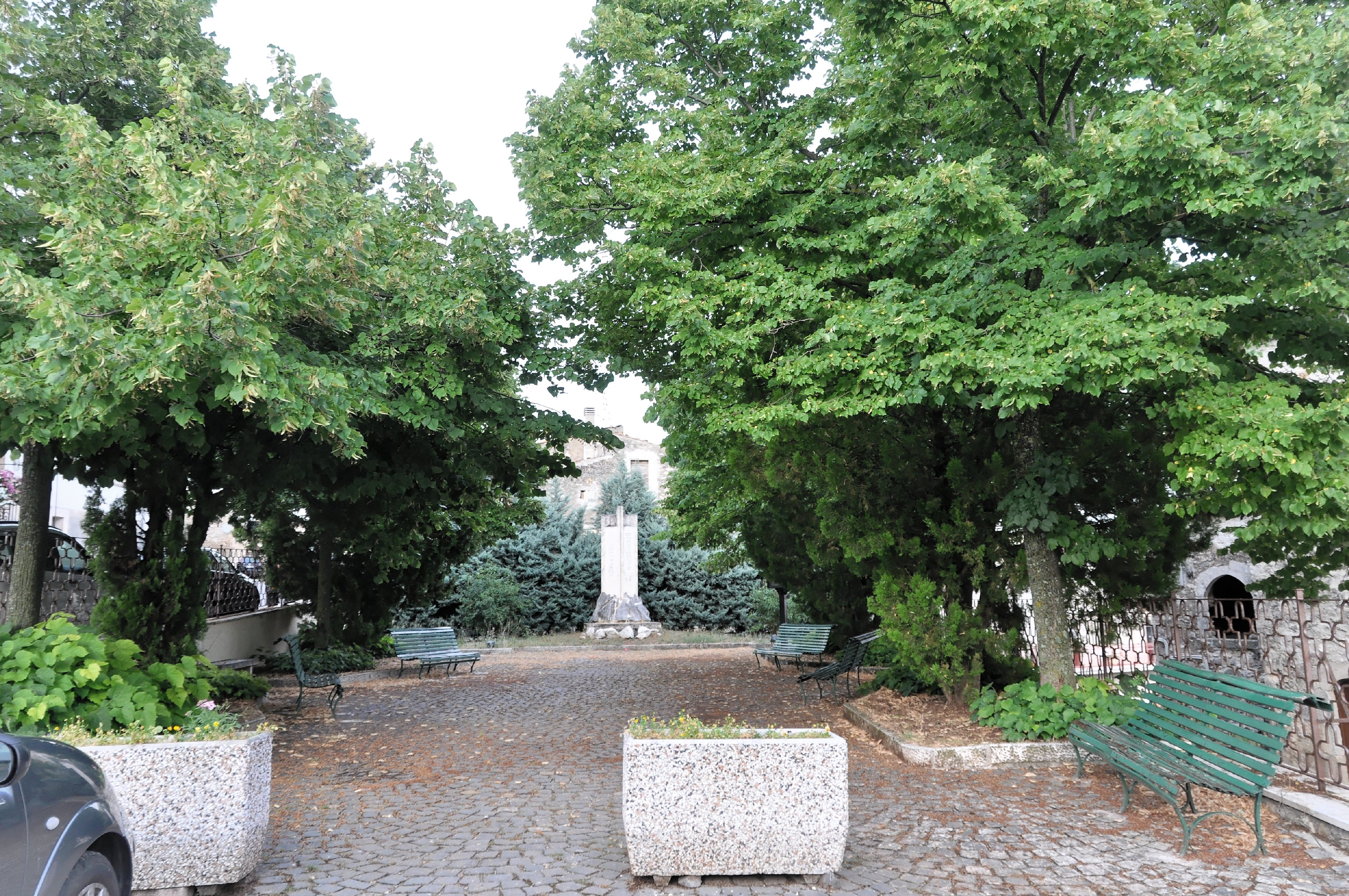
San Benedetto in Perillis (2013)

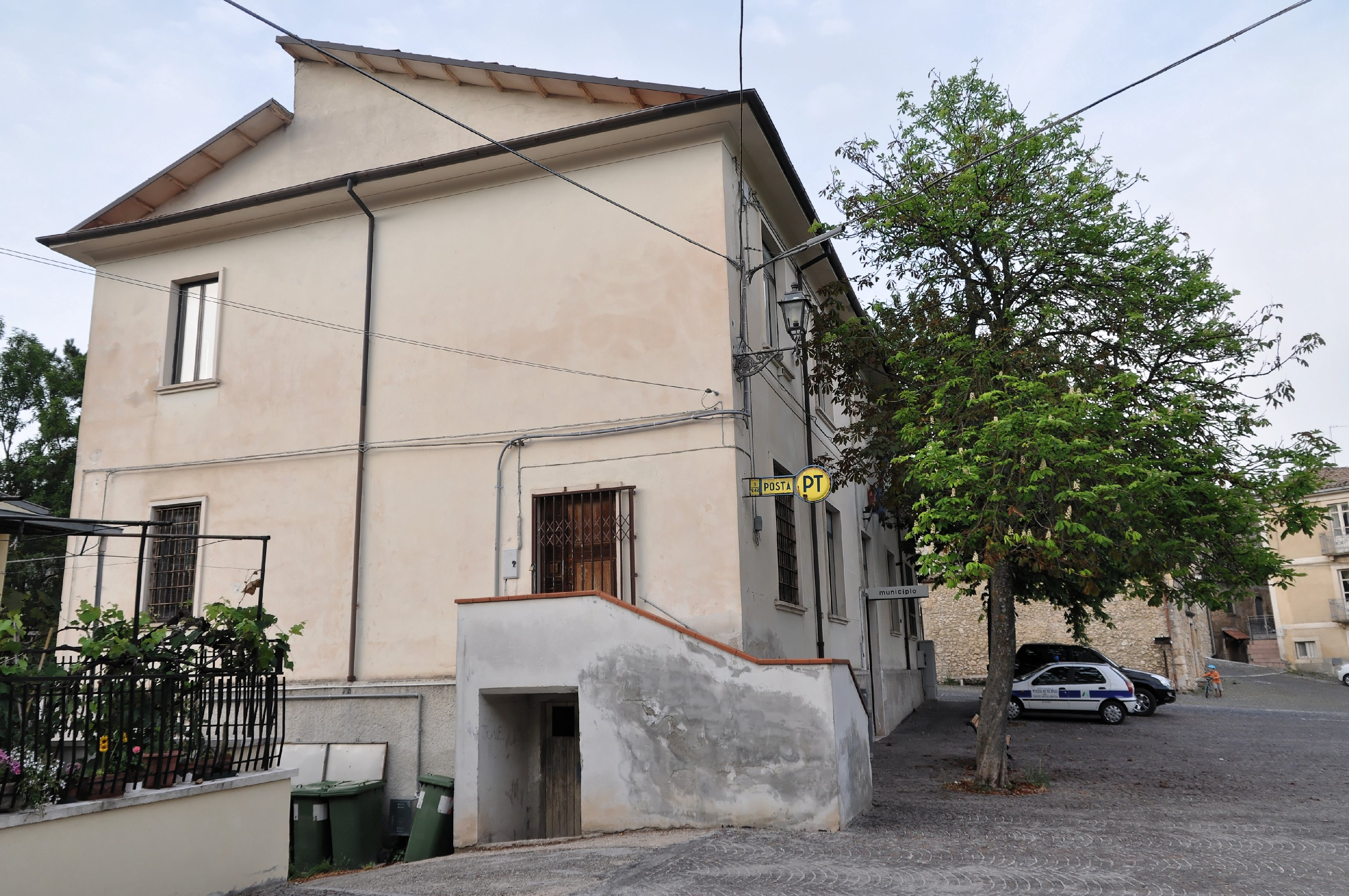
San Benedetto in Perillis (2013)

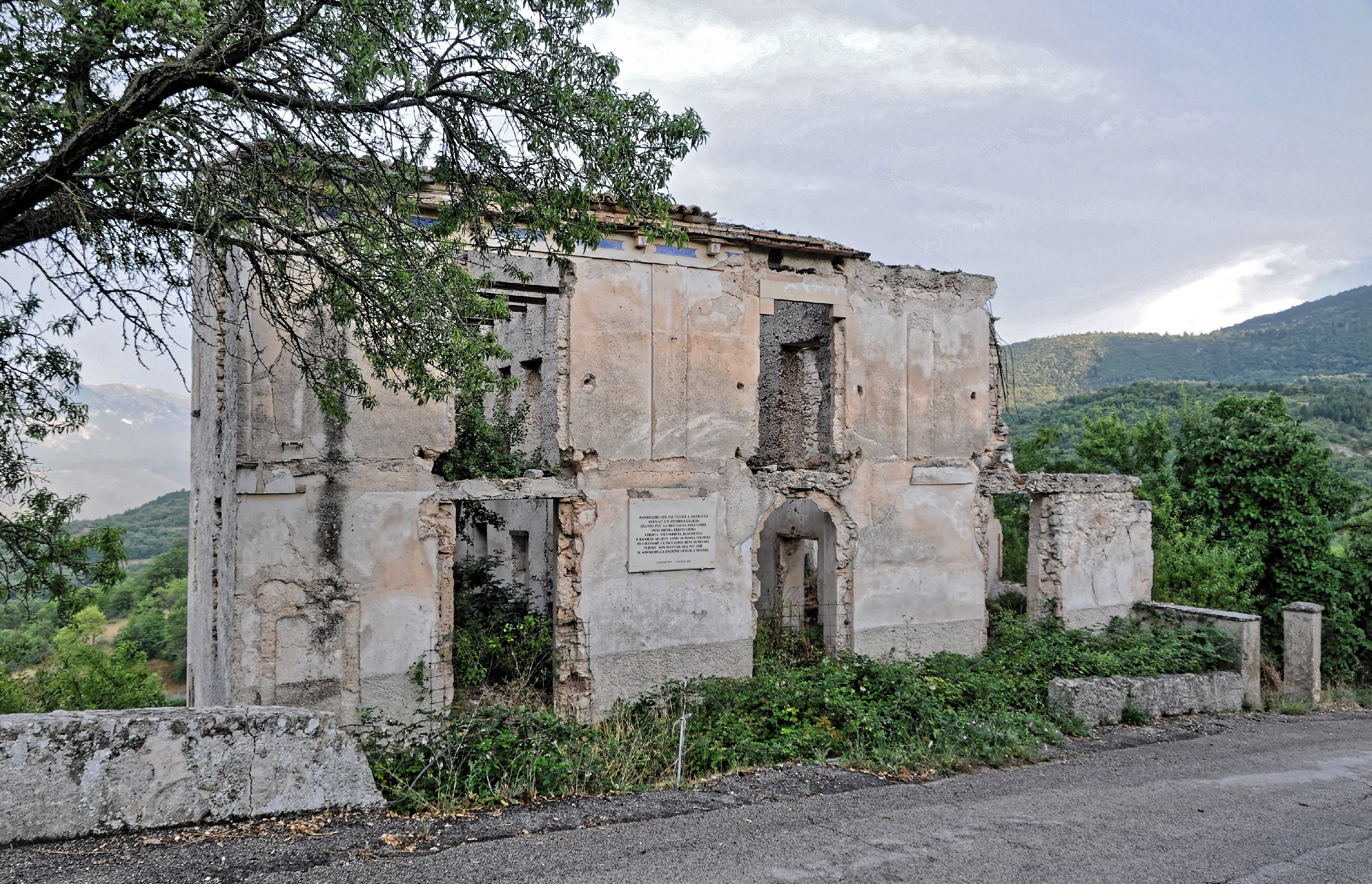
San Benedetto in Perillis (2013)

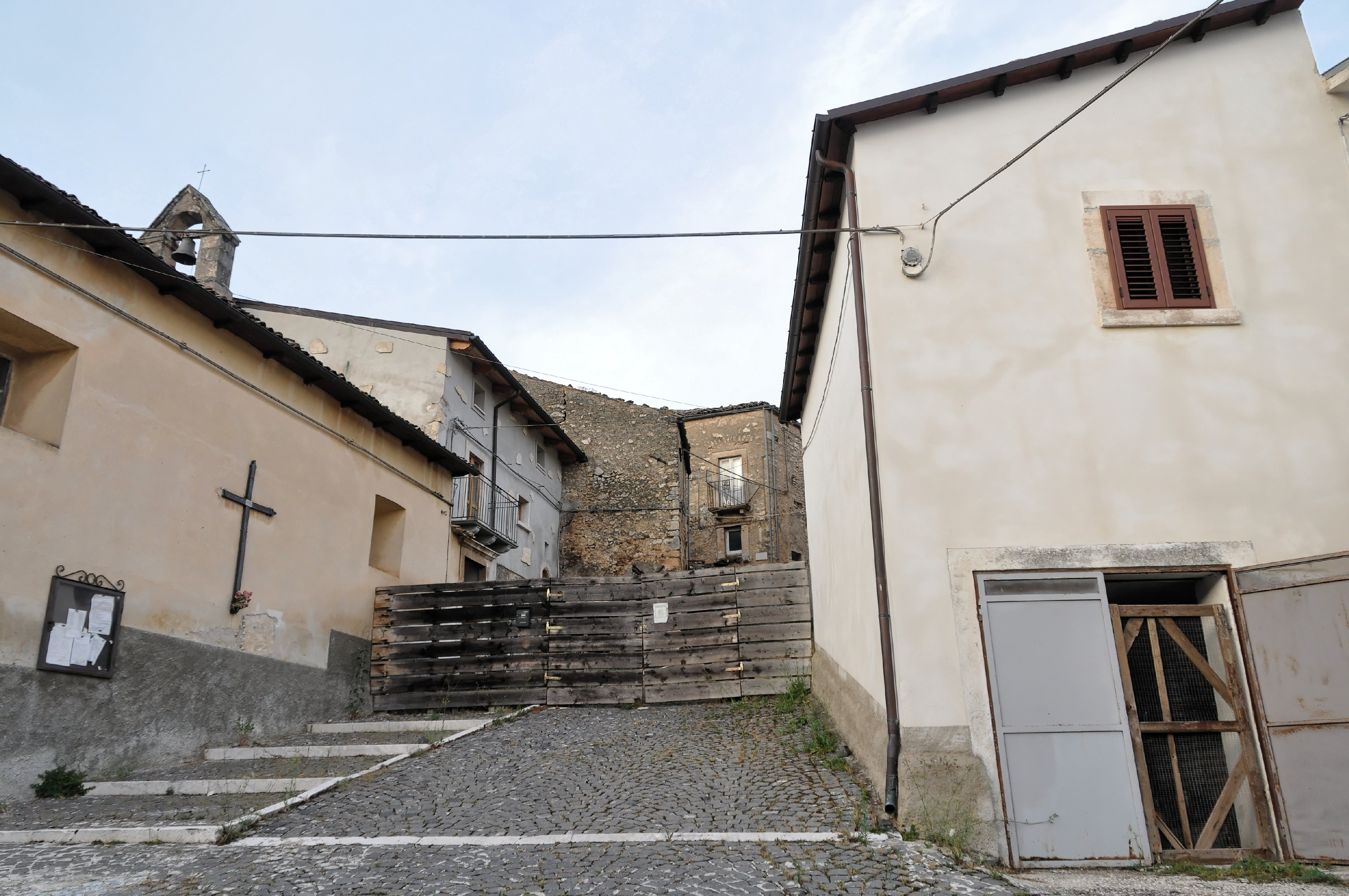
San Benedetto in Perillis (2013)

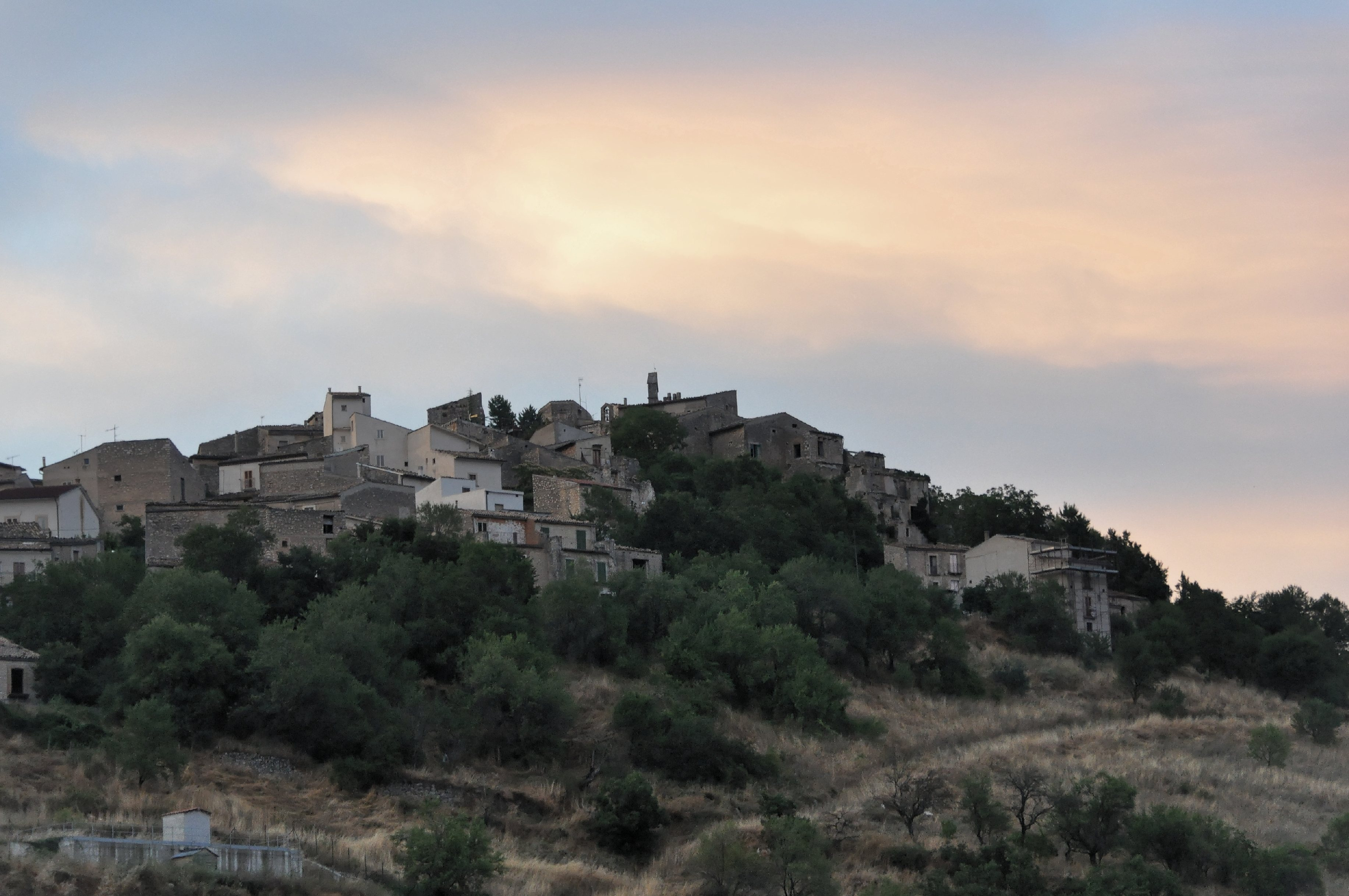
San Benedetto in Perillis (2013)

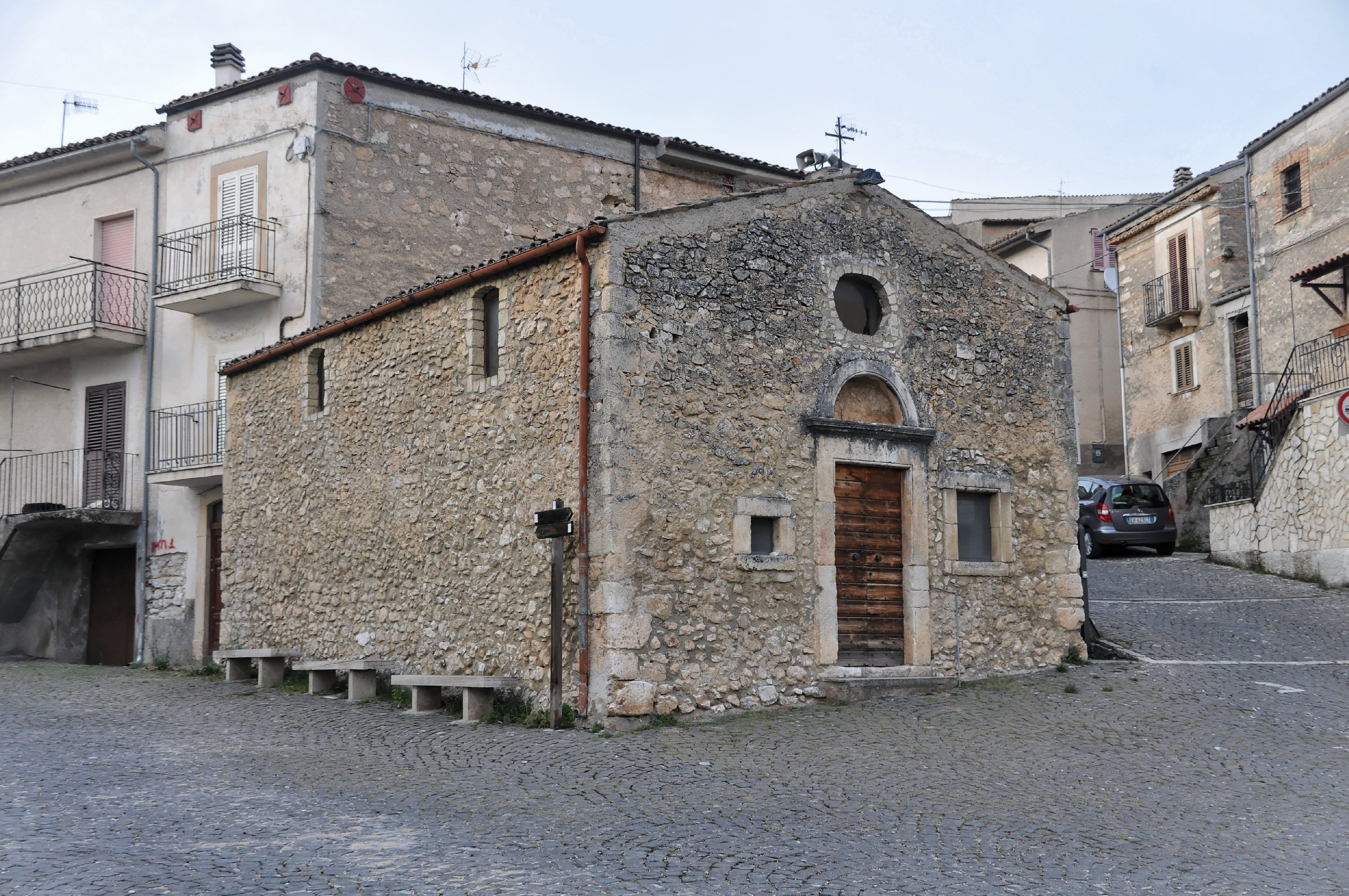
San Benedetto in Perillis (2013)

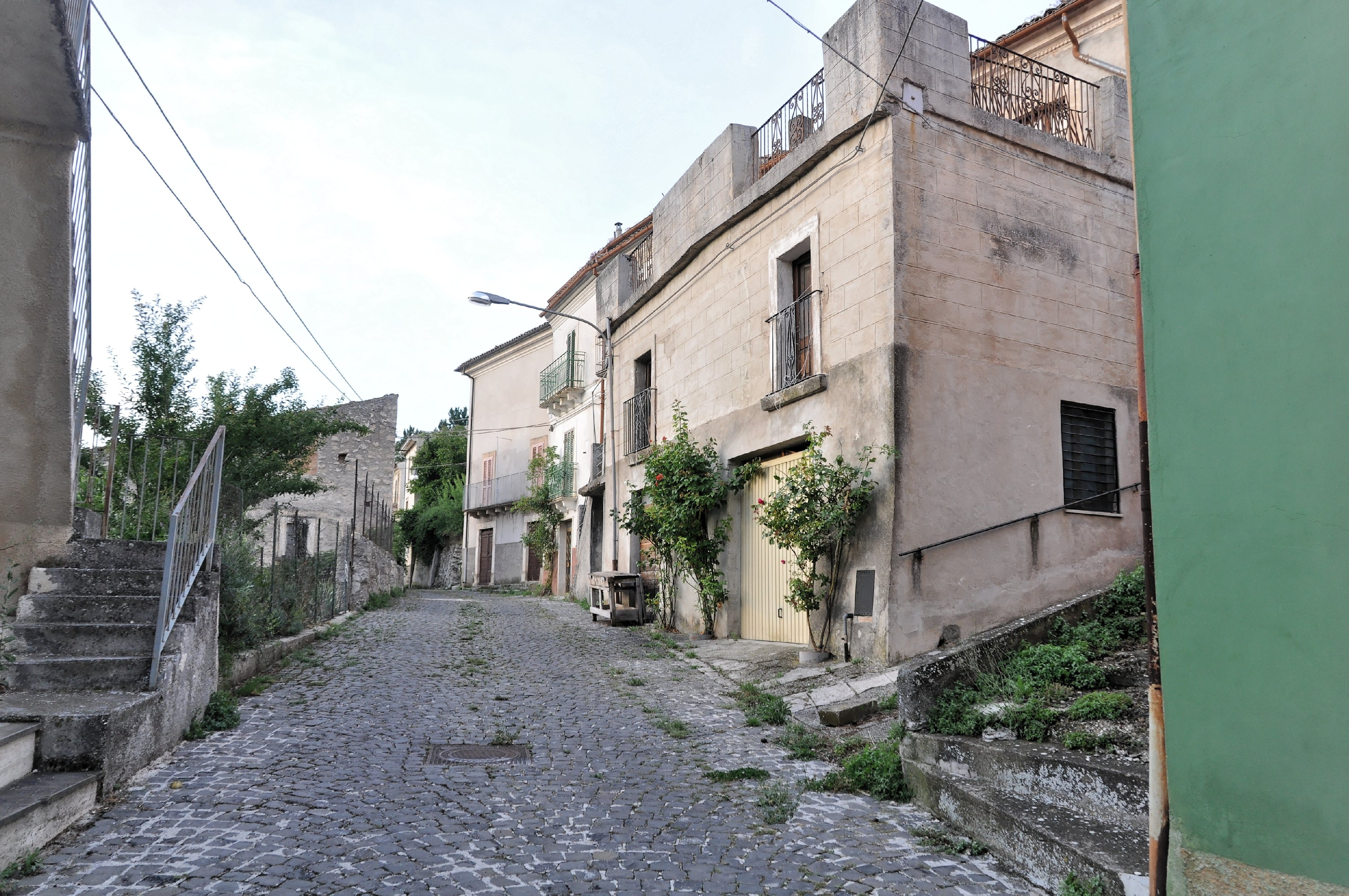
San Benedetto in Perillis (2013)
