= Roio (disambiguation) =

Roio is a frazione of L'Aquila in the Abruzzo.

Roio may also refer to:

- Roio del Sangro, a village and comune of the province of Chieti in the Abruzzo
- Roio Piano, a frazione of L'Aquila in the Abruzzo, region of Italy

== See also ==
- Rojo (disambiguation)
- Royo
