= Camarda =

- Frazione
- Interactive map of Camarda
- Coordinates: 42°23′26″N 13°29′40″E
- Country: Italy
- Region: Abruzzo
- Province: L'Aquila (AQ)
- Commune: L'Aquila
- Time zone: UTC+1 (CET)
  - Summer (DST): UTC+2 (CEST)

Camarda is a frazione (parish or ward) in the comune of L'Aquila in the Abruzzo region of Italy. It is situated on the western slopes of the Gran Sasso, at about 800 meters above sea level, along the state road 17-bis that from Bazzano goes up to Campo Imperatore passing through Paganica, Tempera, Assergi and Fonte Cerreto, once an autonomous municipality before being aggregated to the capital and now seat of the ninth district of the municipality.

In literature, it is known, above all, through the novella in rima entitled La Bella di Camarda, a work by Emidio Cappelli, published in 1857 and reprinted in 1858.

== History ==
Camarda has its origins during the High Middle Ages, when a raid by Lombards pushed many inhabitants of Forcona (an archaeological site located in the area of Bagno) to take refuge in the neighboring areas. According to legend, the name Camarda derives from the cry "Cama ardet!", shouted by the peasants who saw their sheaves burning, which some Lombard soldiers had set on fire.

Afterwards, Camarda was one of the villages that contributed to the foundation of L'Aquila. Since then, this village has bound its destiny to that of the city.

In the 19th century, Camarda was elected Comune, but soon lost this title, to become simply one of the Fraziones of L'Aquila.

The Royal Decree-Law of 29 July 1927 number 1564, decreed the suppression and annexation of the municipalities of Arischia, Bagno, Camarda, Lucoli, Paganica, Preturo, Roio, Sassa and the frazione of San Vittorino belonging to the comune of Pizzoli to the comune of L'Aquila of Abruzzo. In 1947, Lucoli, after having been a fraction of L'Aquila for 20 years, was the only one to be able to restore itself as an autonomous comune, unlike the other 7 suppressed Comunes.

The towns that were part of the Comune of Camarda in 1927 were: Camarda, Filetto, Assergi, Aragno and Pescomaggiore.

The territory of the ex-comune constitutes the ninth circumscription of the Comune of L'Aquila apart from the portion where Aragno is located, included in the land council of participation number eight with Collebrincioni, San Giacomo, San Francesco, and Torrione.
