= Donna d'Onna =

Single by Gianna Nannini, Laura Pausini, Giorgia, Elisa & Fiorella Mannoia

from the album Amiche per l'Abruzzo
- Released: 28 May 2010
- Recorded: San Siro Stadium, 21 June 2009
- Genre: Pop
- Length: 4:33
- Label: Atlantic Records
- Songwriters: Gianna Nannini, Isabella Santacroce
- Producer: Madraxa

Laura Pausini singles chronology
"Casomai" (2010)	"Donna d'Onna" (2010)	"Benvenuto" (2011)

Gianna Nannini singles chronology
"Salvami" (2009)	"Donna d'Onna" (2010)	"Ogni tanto" (2010)

Elisa singles chronology
"Someone to Love" (2010)	"Donna d'Onna" (2010)	"Nostalgia" (2010)

Giorgia singles chronology
"Salvami" (2009)	"Donna d'Onna" (2010)	"Il mio giorno migliore" (2011)

Fiorella Mannoia singles chronology
"Estate" (2010)	"Donna d'Onna" (2010)	"Se veramente Dio esisti" (2010)

"Donna d'Onna" (English: Woman from Onna) is a song written by Italian singer-songwriter Gianna Nannini and Italian novelist Isabella Santacroce. It was written by Nannini after visiting Onna, L'Aquila, in central Italy, in the days following the earthquake of 6 April 2009, specifically to be performed by Nannini with Laura Pausini, Giorgia, Elisa and Fiorella Mannoia during the mega-concert Amiche per l'Abruzzo, held at the San Siro stadium in Milan on 21 June 2009.

The recording of the live performance was released as a single in May of the following year. All net proceeds from the track were donated to the territory hit by the earthquake.

== Background and composition ==
On 6 April 2009, an earthquake occurred in the region of Abruzzo, in central Italy, causing the death of more than 300 people. A few weeks after the event, Italian singer Laura Pausini decided to organize a mega-concert at the San Siro Stadium in Milan, involving all the Italian female singers who decided to accept her invitation or expressed the willing to participate in the event. The concert was presented on 7 May 2009, during a press conference held by some of the participating artists, together with the Italian Minister of Education Mariastella Gelmini. During the press conference, it was revealed that funds raised through the concerts would be used to rebuild the elementary school Edmondo De Amicis in L'Aquila, to build wooden houses and to support the Nonprofit organization Aiutiamoli a vivere.

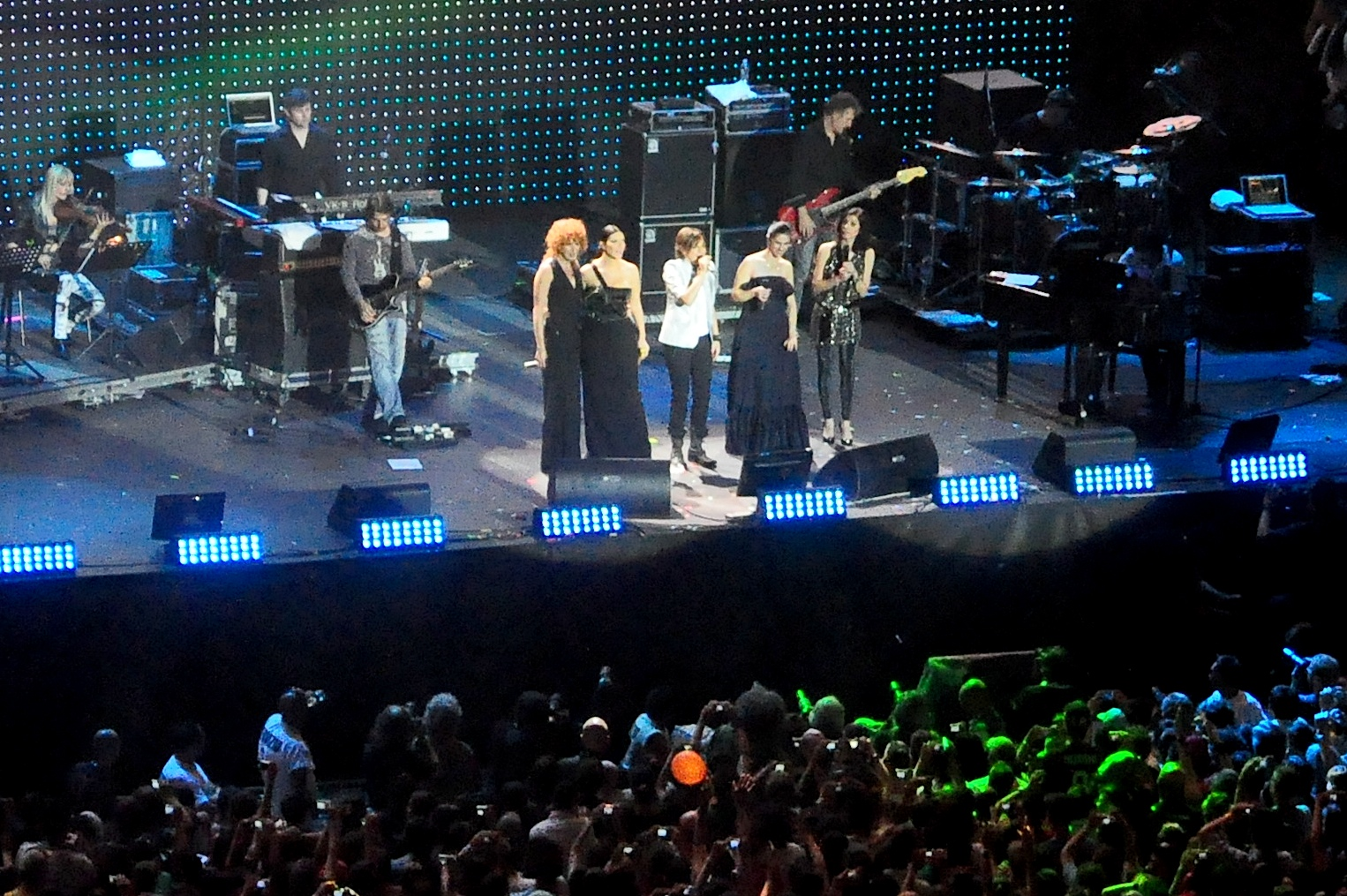
From left to right: Fiorella Mannoia, Laura Pausini, Gianna Nannini, Elisa and Giorgia performing the song during the concert Amiche per l'Abruzzo on 21 June 2009.

Before confirming her participation in the project, Italian singer Gianna Nannini decided to visit some of the areas hit by the earthquake, including Camarda and Onna. The visit gave Nannini the inspiration to compose the song "Donna d'Onna". In an interview released to the Italian newspaper Corriere della Sera, Nannini explained:

"When I went in Abruzzo, I met many women and their pain is still in my eyes, and it made me cry. These are hugs I will never forget. And women are the symbol of future."

Nannini wrote the song together with Italian novelist Isabella Santacroce, expressively to perform it during the concert Amiche per l'Abruzzo together with Laura Pausini, Elisa, Giorgia and Fiorella Mannoia, who served with Nannini as the frontwomen for the event. The song, written in five-fourths, was described by Nannini as a "soul song". It was arranged by British music producer Wil Malone and it was produced by Madraxa, a collective name used to indicate the five artists performing the song.

About 55,000 tickets were sold for the concert, and "Donna d'Onna" was performed as the second last song of the event, before the collective performance of Lucio Battisti's "Il mio canto libero". The live performance was recorded and included in the video album Amiche per l'Abruzzo, released in June 2010.

== Music video ==
The music video for the song, for a total length of 4 minutes and 33 seconds, was filmed during the live performance at the San Siro Stadium in Milan, and it was directed by Gaetano Morbioli and produced by Run Multimedia. It was premiered on the evening of 27 May 2010 on Rockol.it's channel "Music Video".

== Track listing ==
Digital download

1. "Donna d'Onna" – 4:33

== Charts ==
Chart (2010)	Peak position
Italy (FIMI)	8
Italy Airplay (Nielsen Music)	21
