= L'Aquila earthquake =

L'Aquila earthquake may refer to:

- 1461 L'Aquila earthquake
- 1703 L'Aquila earthquake
- 2009 L'Aquila earthquake

== See also ==
- List of earthquakes in Italy
