= Assergi =

- Frazione
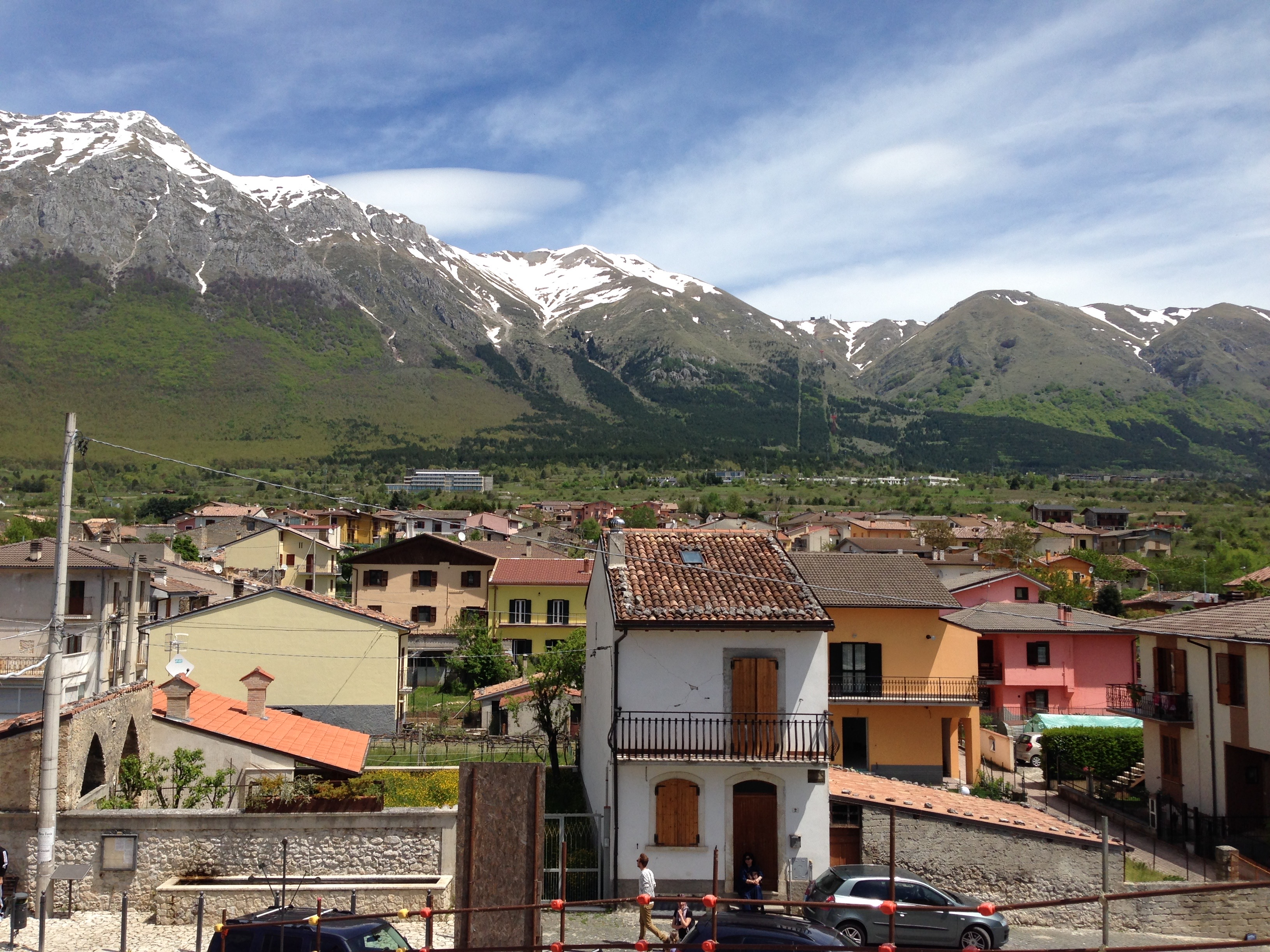

- Location within Italy
- Coordinates: 42°24′N 13°30′E
- Country: Italy
- Region: Abruzzo
- Province: L'Aquila (AQ)
- Commune: L'Aquila
- Elevation: 2,936 ft (895 m)
- Demonym: Assergesi
- Time zone: UTC+1 (CET)
  - Summer (DST): UTC+2 (CEST)
- Postal code: 67100
- Area code: 0862

Assergi is a frazione of the comune of L'Aquila, located about 11 km (6.8 mi) from the capital. With a population of just over 500, it is situated at an altitude of approximately 1,000 meters, below the western slope of the Gran Sasso in a small plain called the Piana di Assergi (Plain of Assergi). Assergi was formerly included in the comune of Camarda, which is directly to its south.

Assergi is located entirely within the Gran Sasso e Monti della Laga National Park, and also contains the Istituto Nazionale di Fisica Nucleare, a national laboratory of nuclear physics. Also in Assergi is the base of the Funivia del Gran Sasso d'Italia, a cable car that leads to the Campo Imperatore.

== History ==
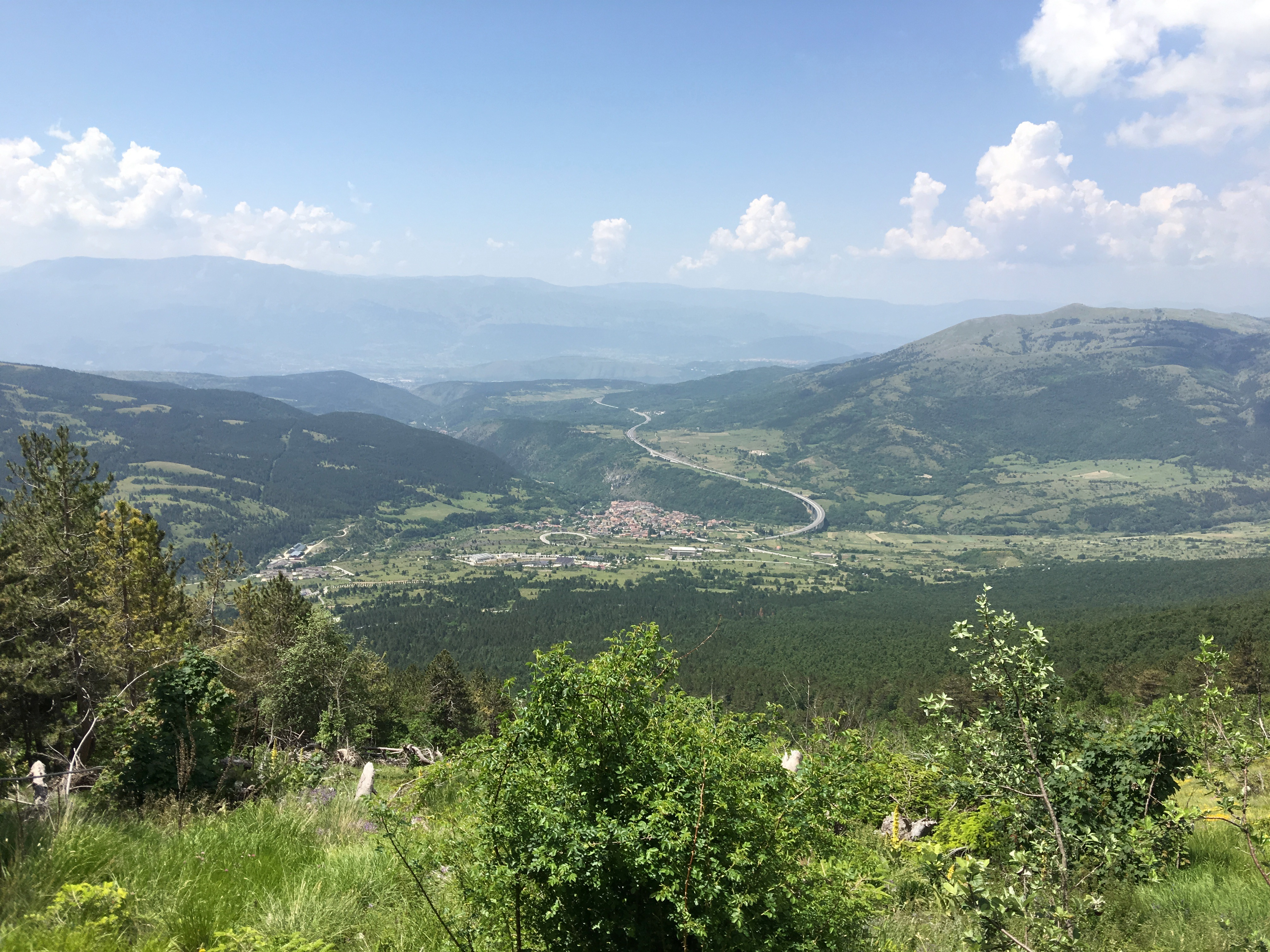
The Plain of Assergi

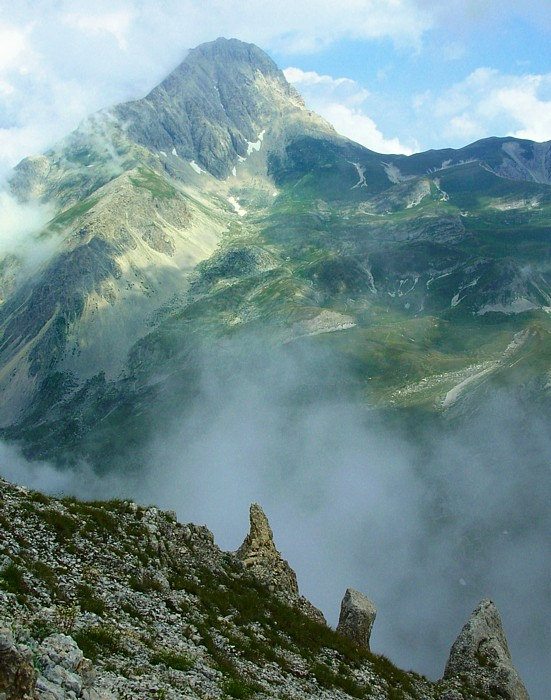
Corno Grande, the highest peak in the Gran Sasso massif

The area around Assergi was settled by the Vestini, a local tribe. These origins are evident in the ruins of the town of Prifernum, situated near the current site of Assergi. Likely abandoned by the second century BC, it was reestablished in Roman times as the small village of Castrum Asserici, to provide accommodation to workers of nearby mines.

The center developed further in the Middle Ages around the Benedictine monastery of Santa Maria ad silicem. The town was completely fortified at the time, and the city walls and gates on the eastern and southern sides are still standing. In the 13th century, Assergi and 98 other local villages participated in the founding of L'Aquila.

As the countryside of L'Aquila dissolved, the Spaniards offered the remaining pieces for sale. Assergi was purchased between 1530 and 1540 by Cristoforo Cenci, whose family remained in the area until the land was lost in events related to Beatrice Cenci after 1586. It was then passed to the Caffarelli family, who held the area as a duke, along with neighboring Aragno, Camarda e Filetto. Despite being on the main route from L'Aquila to Campo Imperatore, the town of Assergi gradually declined in importance. In the 18th century, it joined the district of Paganica, and it later joined the municipality of Camarda until after the unification of Italy.

In 1927, several municipalities were forcefully dissolved and merged to form the Grande Aquila, in order to increase the importance of L'Aquila in the region. The fascist government strongly supported the development of mountain sports and tourism in the area. In 1934, the town of Fonte Cerreto was built slightly above the center of Assergi around the base of the Funivia del Gran Sasso d'Italia, a cable car leading to the Campo Imperatore. Since 1979, there has been an exit on Autostrada A24 in Assergi, allowing for easy connections to Rome and Teramo.

On the other side of the Gran Sasso, and since 1982, it has been the site of the Istituto Nazionale di Fisica Nucleare, who established in 1985, the Laboratori Nazionali del Gran Sasso, a nuclear physics laboratory located under the Gran Sasso massif. The first large experiments at LNGS ran in 1989; the facilities were later expanded, and it is now the largest underground laboratory in the world.

On 6 April 2009, at 03:32 CEST (01:32 UTC), an earthquake of magnitude 5.9 on the Richter scale occurred in L'Aquila, 11km from Assergi. The earthquake caused major damage to the town, forcing it to undergo restoration, some of which is still being undergone.

== Monuments and places of interest ==
Assergi is an important tourist site for nature and sporting trips. It is linked to various nearby villages, including Calascio, Castel del Monte e Santo Stefano di Sessanio, as well as the plain of Campo Imperatore by numerous trails that can be covered on foot, mountain bike, or horseback. It is also located along the l'Ippovia del Gran Sasso, a 300-km horse riding loop trail running along both sides of the Gran Sasso mountain.

=== Old town ===
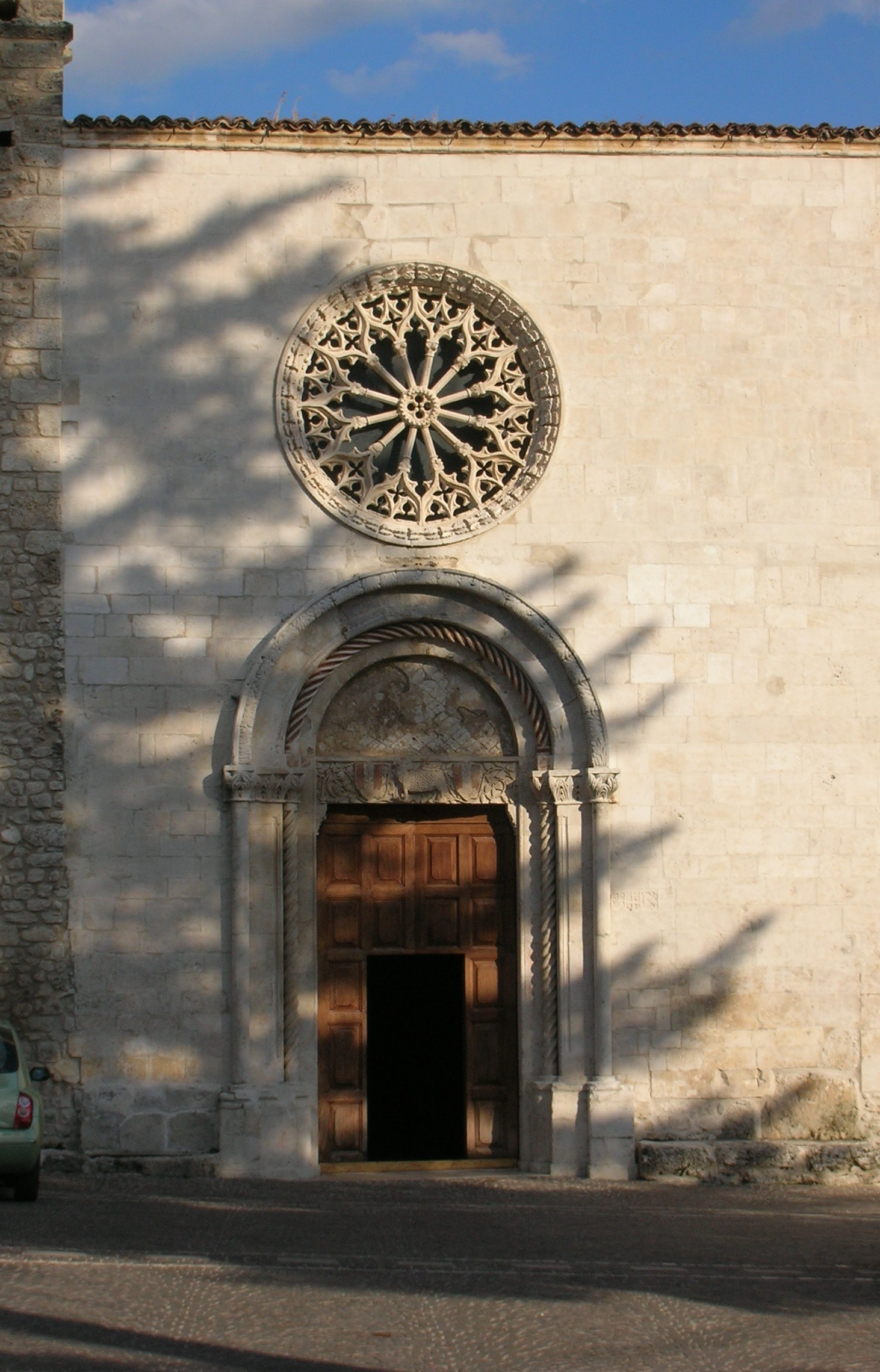
Facade of the church of Santa Maria Assunta

The medieval village is surrounded by a series of walls dating back to the 11th century, much of which are still well preserved. Also standing are three arched gates to the old city.

==== Church of Santa Maria Assunta ====
The Chiesa di Santa Maria Assunta is a church built in the 12th century, originally part of a larger monastery founded by Saint Equizio. The 15th-century facade, in the Romanesque style, is similar to that of the nearby church of Santa Maria di Collemaggio in L'Aquila, and bears the emblem of the region. Of note is the semicircular apse of the demolished church of Santa Maria della Neve, which was adapted for this church.

Inside the church, there are several frescos and a crypt, which is from the ancient church of Saint Francis of Assergi, the patron saint of the town. The crypt is dug from the rock and contains three naves, which houses the relics of Saint Francis.

==== Convent of Santa Maria in Valle ====
Also in Assergi is the convent of Santa Maria in Valle, which was restored at the end of the 20th century. It is now home to the headquarters of the Gran Sasso e Monti della Laga National Park. With an elegant cloister with frescos of the scenes of the life of St. Bernardino of Siena, the building houses a permanent archaeological exhibition of the artifacts from the nearby Male Cave.

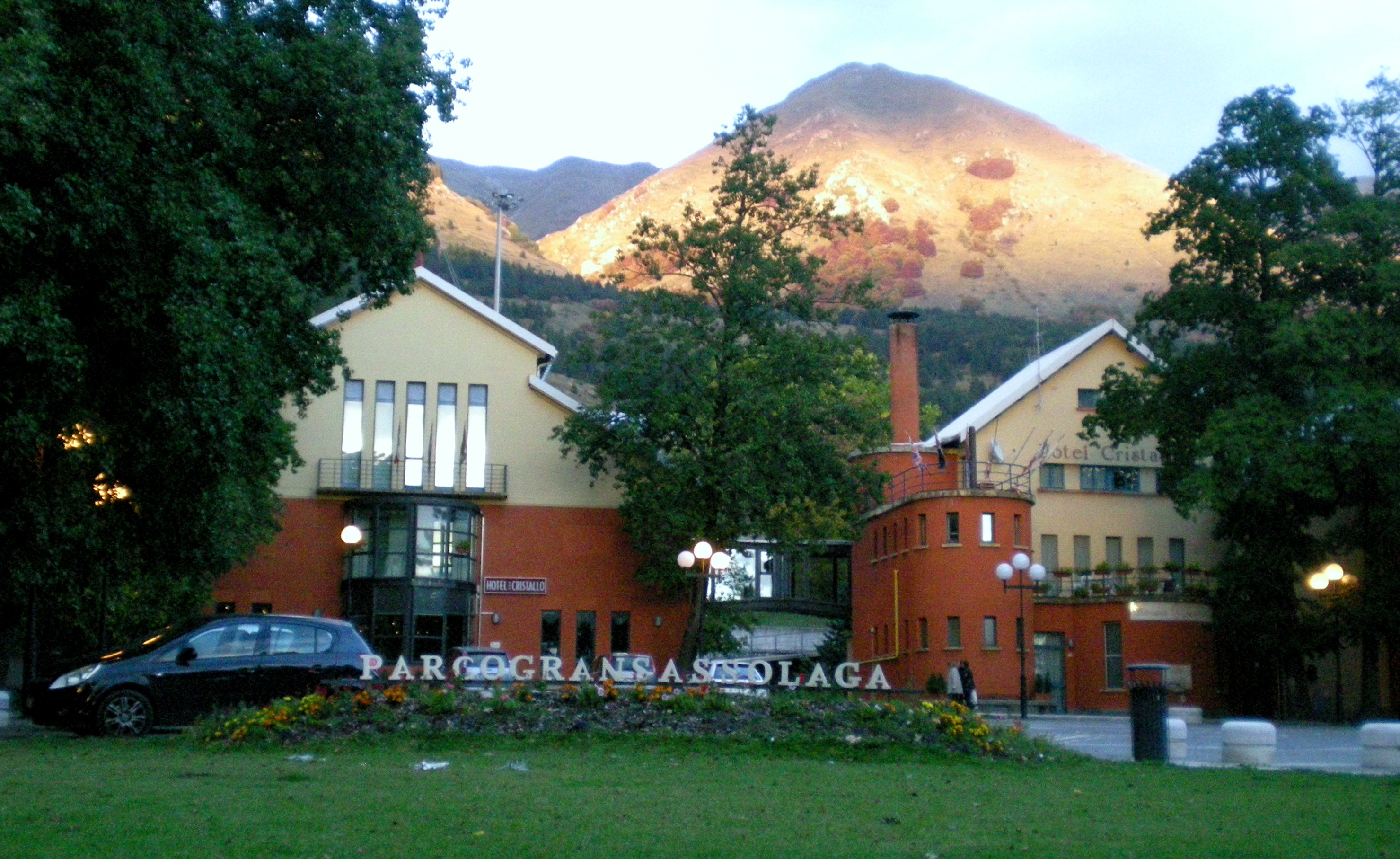
Fonte Cerreto

=== Fonte Cerreto ===
Fonte Cerreto was built in the 1930s as a small tourist resort on the side of the Gran Sasso mountains. It was built under the time of Italian Fascism, as part of a push to develop the tourism and sporting industry in the region. Fonte Cerreto contains the Funivia del Gran Sasso d'Italia cable car, one of the longest in Europe, which provides access within minutes to the Campo Imperatore, where there are various skiing facilities and a resort. Fonte Cerreto, which includes several restaurants and hotels, is a gateway to the national park and is the base of several hiking and ski mountaineering trails that end at the Campo Imperatore. In 2016, an adventure park was opened in the nearby forest. The location is accessible by public transportation from L'Aquila with the M6F bus.

=== San Pietro della Jenca ===
In the vicinity of Assergi is another small village, San Pietro della Jenca, which also participated in the founding of L'Aquila in the 13th century. The village was destroyed as early as the 15th century, and now contains only a few stone buildings, including the church of San Pietro. This church was well known as a favorite destination of Pope John Paul II, and in 1999 was dedicated to him.

== Climate ==
Climate data for Assergi, elevation 1,075 m (3,527 ft), (1951–2000)
Month	Jan	Feb	Mar	Apr	May	Jun	Jul	Aug	Sep	Oct	Nov	Dec	Year
Record high °C (°F)	21.0 (69.8)	22.0 (71.6)	24.9 (76.8)	25.0 (77.0)	30.9 (87.6)	34.8 (94.6)	36.8 (98.2)	39.1 (102.4)	36.2 (97.2)	28.5 (83.3)	22.4 (72.3)	19.0 (66.2)	39.1 (102.4)
Mean daily maximum °C (°F)	5.7 (42.3)	7.1 (44.8)	9.6 (49.3)	12.9 (55.2)	18.1 (64.6)	22.1 (71.8)	25.9 (78.6)	26.0 (78.8)	21.4 (70.5)	15.5 (59.9)	10.1 (50.2)	6.8 (44.2)	15.1 (59.2)
Daily mean °C (°F)	1.9 (35.4)	2.7 (36.9)	5.0 (41.0)	8.1 (46.6)	12.7 (54.9)	16.3 (61.3)	19.4 (66.9)	19.5 (67.1)	15.8 (60.4)	11.0 (51.8)	6.4 (43.5)	3.3 (37.9)	10.2 (50.3)
Mean daily minimum °C (°F)	−1.9 (28.6)	−1.5 (29.3)	0.3 (32.5)	3.2 (37.8)	7.3 (45.1)	10.6 (51.1)	12.9 (55.2)	13.1 (55.6)	10.3 (50.5)	6.4 (43.5)	2.8 (37.0)	−0.2 (31.6)	5.3 (41.5)
Record low °C (°F)	−16.2 (2.8)	−15.0 (5.0)	−16.0 (3.2)	−6.5 (20.3)	−4.9 (23.2)	1.0 (33.8)	3.7 (38.7)	4.6 (40.3)	−2.0 (28.4)	−3.0 (26.6)	−9.9 (14.2)	−12.8 (9.0)	−16.2 (2.8)
Average precipitation mm (inches)	77.4 (3.05)	80.2 (3.16)	76.4 (3.01)	99.7 (3.93)	79.5 (3.13)	68.6 (2.70)	43.8 (1.72)	54.0 (2.13)	71.5 (2.81)	101.2 (3.98)	111.0 (4.37)	96.6 (3.80)	959.9 (37.79)
Average precipitation days	9.8	10.1	9.8	11.4	10.1	8.5	6.0	5.7	7.1	9.8	11.3	10.5	110.1
Source: Regione Abruzzo

== See also ==
- L'Aquila
- Gran Sasso e Monti della Laga National Park
