= Taronia gens =

Ancient Roman family

The gens Taronia or Tarronia was an obscure plebeian family at ancient Rome, known from the late Republic until at least the fourth century. No members of this gens are mentioned in history, but from epigraphy it appears that they had reached senatorial rank by the early third century.

== Origin ==
The nomen Taronius belongs to a large class of gentilicia originally formed from cognomina ending in -o, or in later times from other names, after -onius had come to be regarded as a regular gentile-forming suffix. A great many inscriptions of this family come from Samnium, and in particular from Amiternum, where one of them bore the Oscan praenomen Pompo, equivalent to the Latin Quintus. From this it would seem that the Taronii were probably of Samnite descent. The form Taronius is more frequent, and appears in most of the older inscriptions, while the form Tarronius seems to belong to imperial times.

== Praenomina ==
Most of the Taronii whose praenomina are known were named Lucius, Gaius, Publius, and Quintus, four of the most common names at all periods of Roman history. Besides the early instance of the Oscan name Pompo, there are also examples of the names Aulus, Gnaeus, Marcus, and Titus, each of which was also common throughout Roman times.

== Members ==
This list includes abbreviated praenomina. For an explanation of this practice, see filiation.

- Lucius Taronius L. l. Philoxsenus, a freedman named in an inscription from Amiternum in Samnium, dating from the first half of the first century BC, along with Lucius Taronius Protio, and the freedwoman Toedia Ialisy.
- Lucius Taronius L. l. Protio, a freedman named in an inscription from Amiternum, dating from the first half of the first century BC, along with Lucius Taronius Philoxsenus, and the freedwoman Toedia Ialisy.
- Lucius Taronius L. f., named in a first century BC inscription from Amiternum.
- Gaius Taronius Serranus, buried in a first-century BC tomb at Amiternum.
- Lucius Taronius, a member of a college of octoviri, a board of eight men, perhaps municipal administrators, named in an inscription found at the site of modern Roio Piano, formerly part of Samnium, dating from the first half of the first century.
- Taronia Tertia, named in a sepulchral inscription from Nersae in Samnium, dating from the first half of the first century, apparently the tomb of Lucius Carcurinius, formerly an aedile and quaestor, perhaps her husband.
- Publius Taronius P. l. Isidorus, a freedman mentioned in a first-century inscription from Amiternum.
- Tarronius Salutaris, (Note: Neither the name of her former master nor her surname are certain. Her master may have been Quintianus, or perhaps Quintus; her surname could be Saluta, an Oscan praenomen.) a freedwoman named in a late first-century inscription from Rome.
- Gaius Tarronius Titianus, a potter whose maker's mark is known from two pieces of pottery found at Rome, and dating from AD 123.
- Lucius Taronius, built a tomb for one Claudius at Salona in Dalmatia, dating between the middle of the second century and the end of the third.
- Quintus Tarronius Julianus, a centurion in the Legio XXII Primigenia, made an offering to Jove, Juno, Minerva, and the other gods at Mogontiacum, some time in the late second or early third century.
- Tarronius, together with his brother, Helvinius, dedicated a third-century tomb at Rome for another brother, Dexter.
- Quintus Tarronius Q. f. Felix Dexter, a man of senatorial rank, was designated to become curule aedile at some point between AD 220 and 250. An inscription from Allifae in Campania describes him as patron of the carpenters' guild.
- Quintus Egnatius Gallienus Lucillus Lollianus Tarronius Pisoninus, described as a learned and erudite young man of senatorial rank, who was buried at Allifae between AD 220 and 250, aged eighteen years, ten months, and twenty-two days, is listed under "Tarronius" in Prosopographia Imperii Romani, but should perhaps be considered an Egnatius, as his father is identified as the senator Quintus Egnatius Gallienus. From the name, time, and period, he was likely related to Quintus Tarronius Felix Dexter, and may have descended from the Tarronii through a maternal line.
- Tarronia Proba, buried at Rome, in a fourth-century tomb dedicated by her son, Leo.

=== Undated Taronii ===
- Taronia L. f., named in an inscription from Amiternum, along with Gnaeus Taronius, probably a relative.
- Gnaeus Taronius Pomponis f., named in an inscription from Amiternum, along with Taronia, probably a relative.
- Lucius Taronius, the master of Auctus, a slave mentioned in an inscription from Caudium in Samnium.
- Marcus Tarronius, named in an inscription from Carthage in Africa Proconsularis.
- Pompo Taronius, the father of Gnaeus Taronius, mentioned in an inscription from Amiternum.
- Titus Taronius Celer, originally one of the Bessi, a Thracian tribe, was a soldier in the Praetorian Guard at Ravenna, and was subsequently buried at Athens, aged thirty.
- Publius Taronius P. l. Eros, a freedman buried at Amiternum, along with Publius Taronius Phileros and the freedwoman Lucretia Psyce.
- Gaius Tarronius Festivus, named in an inscription from Carthage.
- Publius Taronius P. l. Phileros, a freedman buried at Amiternum, along with Publius Taronius Eros and the freedwoman Lucretia Psyce.
- Taronia Quintilla, built a tomb at Rome for her client, the freedwoman Taronia Restituta.
- Taronia Restituta, a freedwoman buried at Rome, with a monument from her patron, Taronia Quintilla.
- Aulus Taronius Verus, originally one of the Dalmatae, became a Roman soldier. He was buried at Ravenna, aged fifty, with a monument from his wife, Petronia Liberalis.

== See also ==
- List of Roman gentes

== Bibliography ==
- Theodor Mommsen et alii, Corpus Inscriptionum Latinarum (The Body of Latin Inscriptions, abbreviated CIL), Berlin-Brandenburgische Akademie der Wissenschaften (1853–present).
- Giovanni Battista de Rossi, Inscriptiones Christianae Urbis Romanae Septimo Saeculo Antiquiores (Christian Inscriptions from Rome of the First Seven Centuries, abbreviated ICUR), Vatican Library, Rome (1857–1861, 1888).
- Gustav Wilmanns, Inscriptiones Africae Latinae (Latin Inscriptions from Africa), Georg Reimer, Berlin (1881).
- René Cagnat et alii, L'Année épigraphique (The Year in Epigraphy, abbreviated AE), Presses Universitaires de France (1888–present).
- Paul von Rohden, Elimar Klebs, & Hermann Dessau, Prosopographia Imperii Romani (The Prosopography of the Roman Empire, abbreviated PIR), Berlin (1898).
- Giuseppe Da Bra, Iscrizioni latine di S. Lorenzo (Latin Inscriptions of San Lorenzo), Rome (1931).
- Zeïneb Benzina Ben Abdallah and Leïla Ladjimi Sebaï, Catalogue des inscriptions latines païennes inédites du Musée de Carthage (Catalogue of Unpublished Pagan Latin Inscriptions from the Museum of Carthage, abbreviated CILPCart), Rome (2011).
