= Palazzo del Convitto =

Monumental complex in L'Aquila, Italy, serving educational and administrative purposes

Coordinates: 42°21′03″N 13°23′58″E

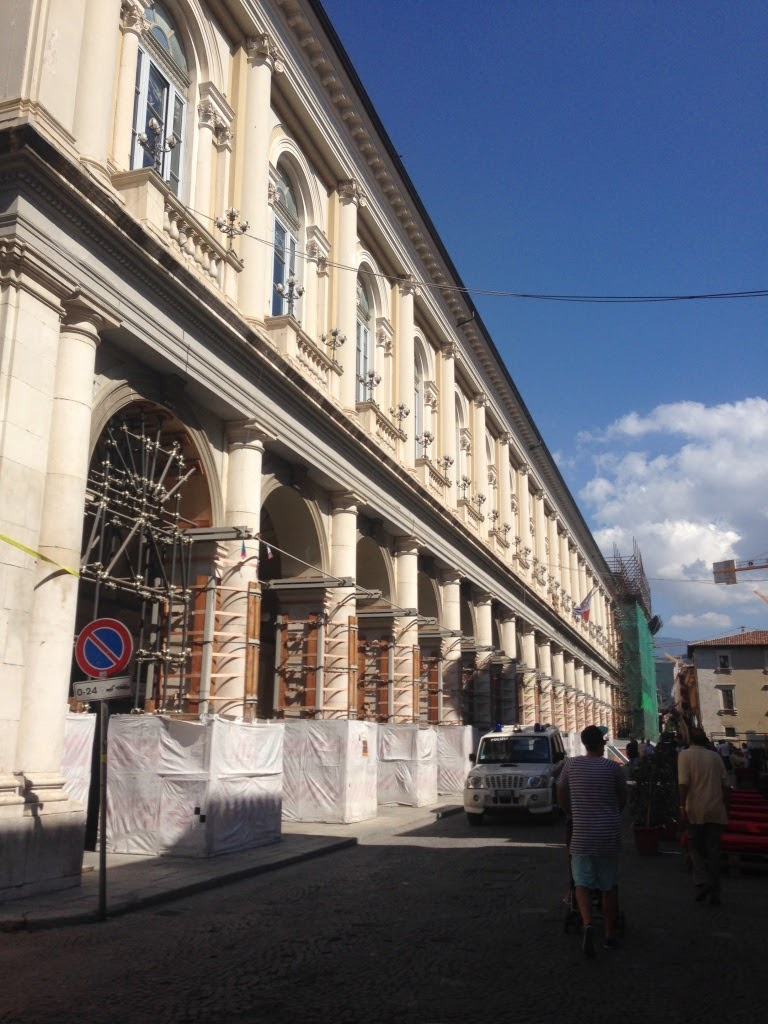
- The facade on Corso Vittorio Emanuele
- Interactive map of the Palazzo del Convitto area

General information
- Status: unusable
- Architectural style: Neoclassical
- Location: Corso Vittorio Emanuele, Piazza del Palazzo, L'Aquila, Italy
- Year built: 1878–1882, 1886–1893, 1928–1930
- Cost: 421,702.87 lire
- Owner: Province of L'Aquila

Design and construction
- Architect: Mario Gioia (1928–1930)
- Civil engineer: Antonio Mancini (1878–1882), Francesco Catalani, Antonio Lepidi (1886–1893)
- Main contractor: Vincenzo Di Marco (1878–1882), F.lli Barattelli (1928–1930)

The Palazzo del Convitto, also known as the Palazzo del Liceo or Palazzo della Biblioteca, sometimes referred to as the Palazzo delle Corporazioni or Palazzo dell'Economia, (Note: The different names actually refer to the uses of the individual buildings that make up the complex, which was built in several phases and lacks an official title. According to the historical-urban reconstruction by Mario Centofanti, the Palazzo del Convitto or Palazzo del Liceo (or Palazzo della Biblioteca) refers to the northern wing of the complex, built between 1878 and 1882, while the Palazzo delle Corporazioni or Palazzo dell'Economia identifies the southern portion of the complex, expanded between 1928 and 1930. See Mario Centofanti, Nuove architetture per la città «moderna», in Un palazzo, una città [A Palace, a City] (in Italian)..) is a monumental complex in L'Aquila.

It was built in the 19th century to replace the Church and Convent of San Francesco a Palazzo, at the behest of the Province of L'Aquila, and has historically housed the National Boarding School Domenico Cotugno and Liceo Ginnasio Domenico Cotugno, the Salvatore Tommasi Provincial Library, the Chamber of Commerce of L'Aquila, and the Province of L'Aquila.

It is located at the intersection of Corso Principe Umberto and Corso Vittorio Emanuele, with an additional frontage on Piazza del Palazzo.

== History ==
From a medieval city that did not know the reality of a "corso", perhaps only that of the square, to a city that managed through demolitions to equip itself with wide and main streets, the step was decisive, but behind it there was a whole culture that was anxiously trying to project itself forward, even at the cost of enormous financial sacrifices.

— Alessandro Clementi

=== Franciscan preexistence and establishment of the Royal Lyceum ===
From the period immediately following the founding of L'Aquila until the 19th century, the urban block between Piazza del Palazzo and Corso Vittorio Emanuele was under the control of the Franciscan Order, which built the Church of San Francesco a Palazzo with an adjoining convent; the latter became particularly notable between the 14th and 15th century when it hosted religious and humanistic figures of the time, such as James of the Marches and, above all, Bernardino of Siena, who stayed there until his death on 20 May 1444.

The historical events that led to the construction of the Palazzo del Convitto are quite complex and originate in 1816 with the establishment of the Royal College of the Three Abruzzi (later Liceo Ginnasio Domenico Cotugno), whose headquarters were established within the Franciscan complex, which had been left unused due to the suppression of religious orders.

In the mid-19th century, the draining of Lake Fucine and the unification of Italy altered the geopolitical landscape of Abruzzo, and L'Aquila suddenly found itself in a marginal position relative to the main transportation and commercial routes of Central Italy. This situation prompted Mayor Fabio Cannella to seek reassurances from the central government, including the stabilization of the Royal Lyceum and its transformation into a state university.

After a heated debate, the Aquilan lyceum – along with the other southern royal lyceums in Bari, Catanzaro, and Salerno — became a university school, a status it maintained until the Gentile Reform of 1923. As hoped by Cannella, the number of students at the college progressively increased, necessitating in 1876 the construction of new dormitories and then the erection of a new wing in the space of the convent gardens. During the same period, the Church of San Francesco a Palazzo was deconsecrated, and its ownership passed to the Province of L'Aquila, which initially planned to establish the civic museum there.

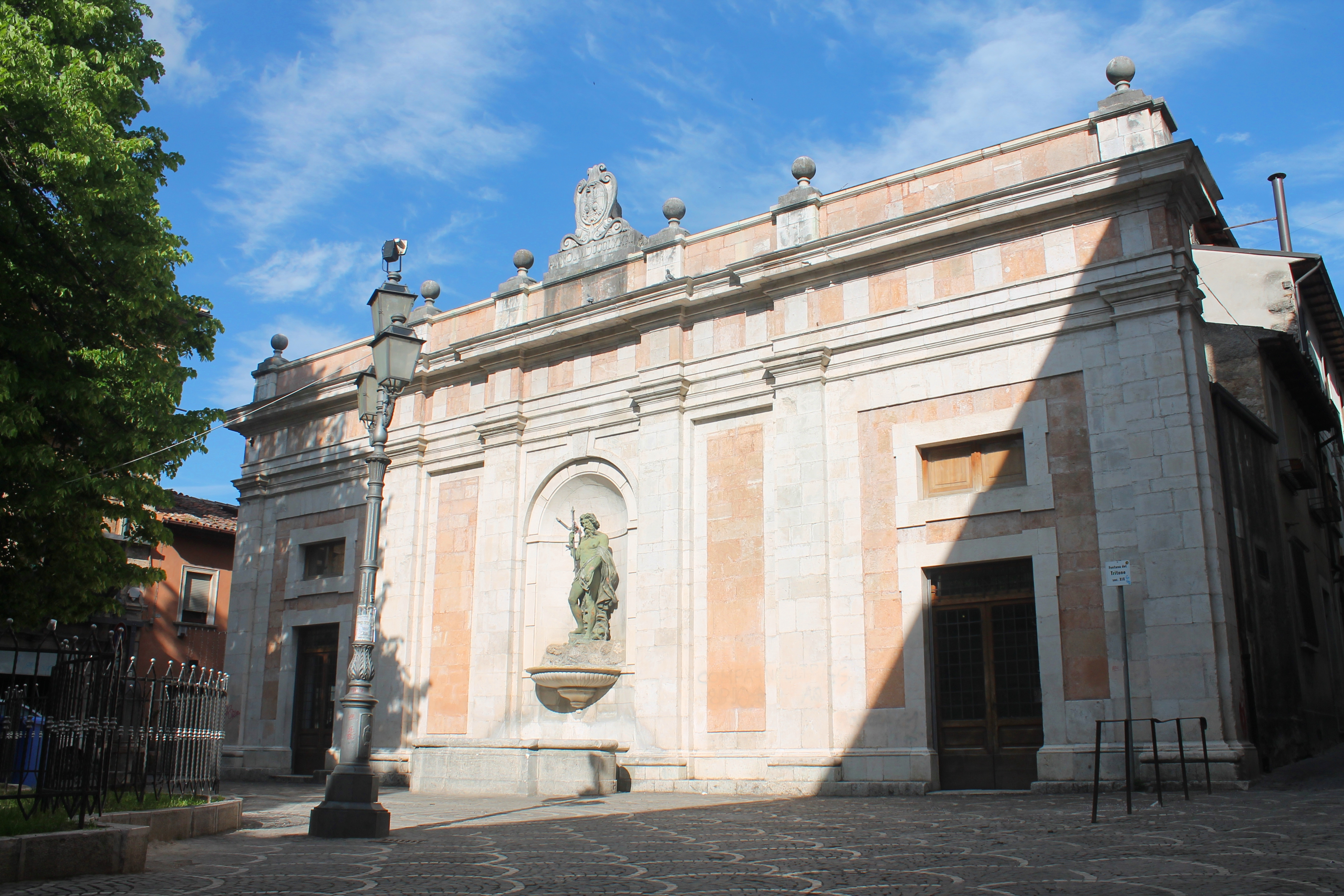
The partially reconstructed facade of the Church of San Francesco a Palazzo in Piazza Regina Margherita.

=== First construction phase (1878–1882) ===
Starting in 1875, at the urging of Fabio Cannella, a radical transformation of the block was considered, involving the construction of a new arcaded palace on the site of the Franciscan complex, to create a cultural center housing schools, the college, and the Salvatore Tommasi Provincial Library. This urban solution arose from administrative and functional needs to accommodate a political vision; it was opposed by Archbishop Luigi Filippi, who appealed to the Intendenza against the demolition of the religious site.

Despite the protests from the Archdiocese of L'Aquila, on 12 September 1876, the demolition order was decreed; the facade of the destroyed church was later partially reconstructed on a civil building in Piazza Regina Margherita.

In 1877, a design competition was held, evaluated by the Academic College of Arts and Design in Florence, which declared Antonio Mancini's project the winner. Work began in 1878, entrusted to the company of Vincenzo Di Marco. The first construction phase of the palace ended in 1882 with the completion of the so-called "Portici dell'Ateneo", although interior work continued until 1884.

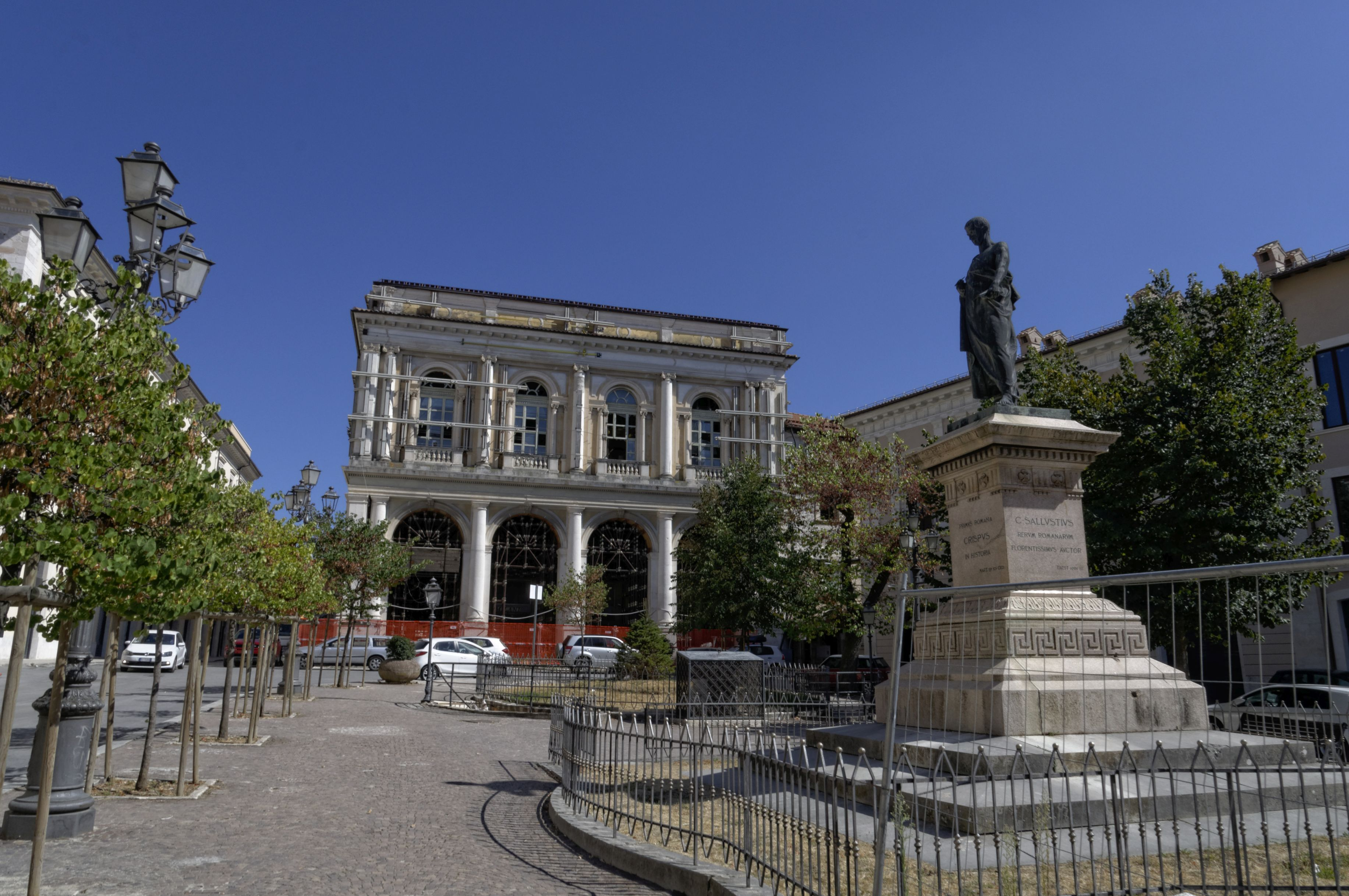
The western facade of the complex on Piazza del Palazzo.

=== Second construction phase (1886–1893) ===
In the following years, work on the Palazzo del Convitto coincided with that of the adjacent Palazzo della Cassa di Risparmio (1883–1888), which continued the arcaded axis, and the creation of the new Via Sallustio, which would only be realized in the mid-20th century, requiring numerous expropriations.

Additional variant projects were drafted for the continuation of the work, by engineers Ciuffoletti and Alessandro Mancini, alongside Francesco Catalani's project for the extension of the complex. In 1886, the project for the arcades up to the Church of the Conception was approved, and between 1887 and 1888, the palace was extended to the current Via Sallustio. The 18th century religious preexistence necessitated a compromise between the municipal authority and the Archdiocese of L'Aquila, resulting in the decision to demolish the existing church and rebuild it set back from the arcade, thus avoiding interruption of the facade's continuity.

Between 1891 and 1893, with the completion of the facade on Via Sallustio designed by Antonio Lepidi, the 19th-century construction of the Palazzo del Convitto was finished.

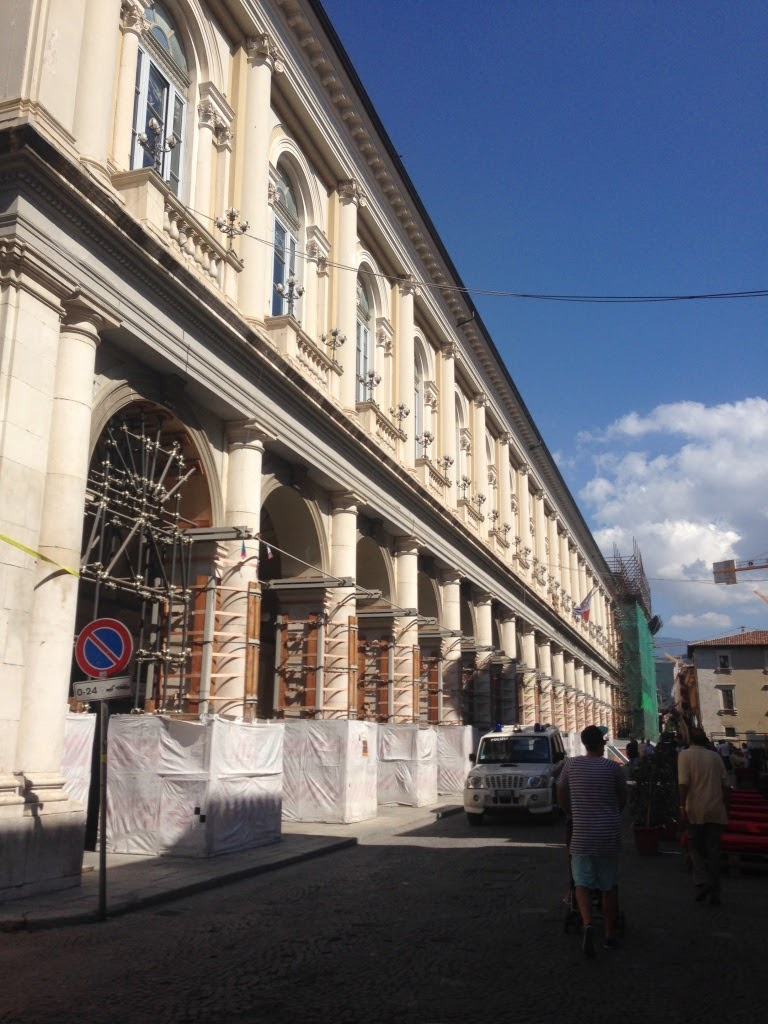
The eastern facade of the complex on Corso Vittorio Emanuele with the elevation of 1928–1930.

=== Third construction phase (1928–1930) ===
At the beginning of the 20th century, the Palazzo del Convitto appeared complete, divided into two large blocks separated by Via Sallustio; however, the eastern facade remained incomplete, characterized only by the arcaded avenue without the upper floor.

At the urging of the Deputazione Abruzzese di Storia Patria, from 1906, the Province of L'Aquila commissioned Alessandro Mancini to design the elevation of the palace extension on Corso Vittorio Emanuele. Due to requests for changes to the original project and further economic complications – exacerbated by the outbreak of World War I and the 1915 Avezzano earthquake — the extension was not carried out for at least twenty years.

Only in 1928 was the elevation of the complex approved based on a new project by architect Mario Gioia, thanks to funding from the Provincial Council of Economy, which requested and obtained the free concession of the new premises. The work was contracted to the Barattelli brothers' company, and the inauguration of the new wing – named Palazzo dell'Economia – took place on 27 October 1930.

=== Recent events ===
In 1943, the complex was occupied by the Germans, who installed the main provincial command there; after the liberation of the city on 13 June 1944, it was occupied by Allied troops. In those years, the Provincial Council of Economy was headquartered in the Cataldi Madonna palace on Via Garibaldi, and, once reconstituted as the Chamber of Commerce, it could only return to occupy the historic headquarters within the Palazzo dell'Economia in 1951.

In the 1970s, the Chamber of Commerce decided to move to the Palazzo Pica Angelini on Via del Guastatore, which had been its original headquarters, so the premises of the Palazzo dell'Economia were temporarily granted to the Abruzzo Region; the entity later returned to the complex following renovation works on the building in 1992.

The entire Palazzo del Convitto complex suffered severe damage from the 2009 L'Aquila earthquake, which also led to the death of three young people housed in the National Boarding School Domenico Cotugno. Between 2015 and 2018, minimal structural consolidation of the arcades along Corso Vittorio Emanuele was carried out, with scaffolding maintained to support the structure. The reconstruction of the complex has been divided into three phases; only for the first phase has the necessary administrative process been completed, with work expected to begin in the first half of 2022.

== Description ==
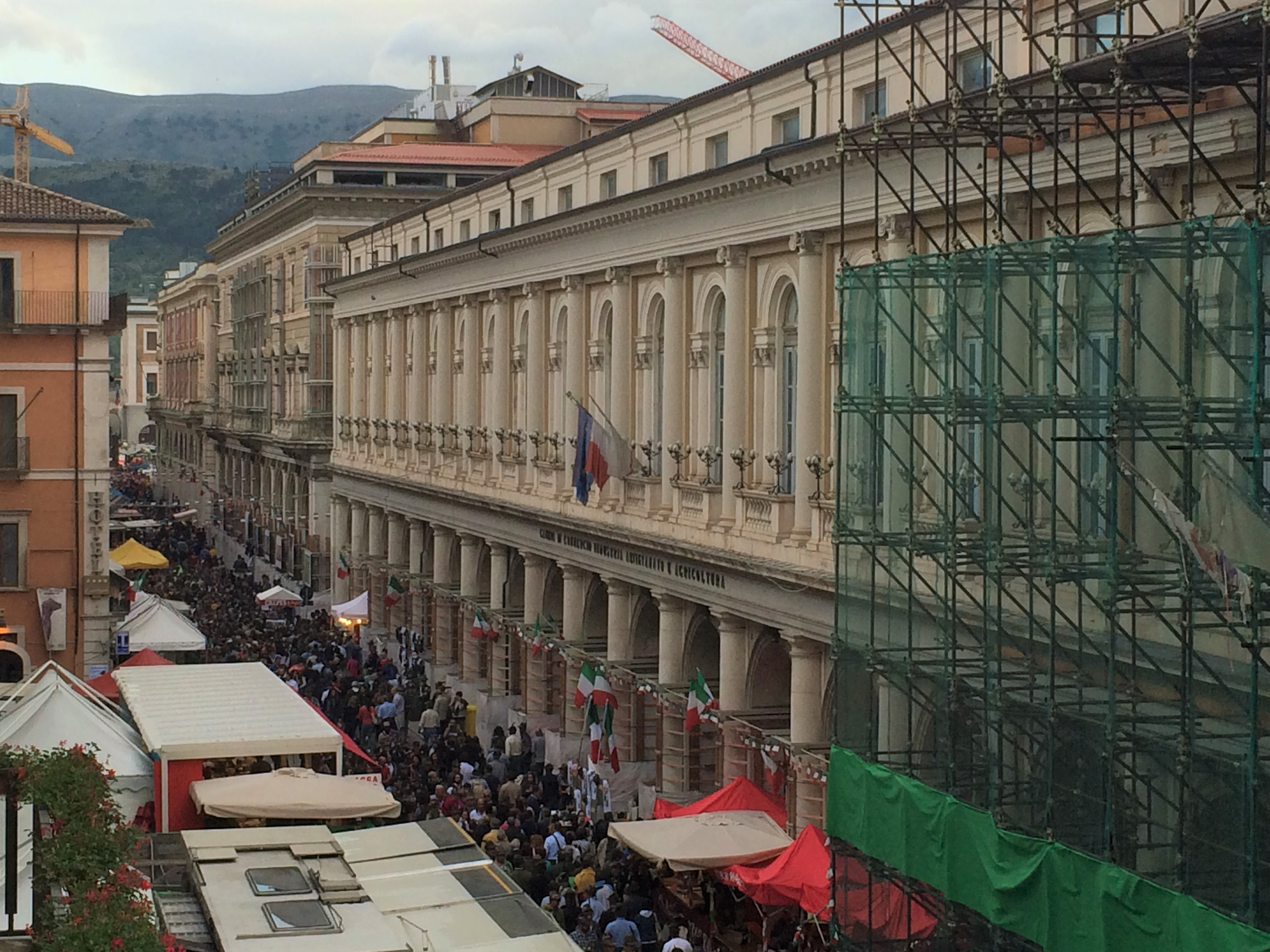
The eastern facade on Corso Vittorio Emanuele.

The Palazzo del Convitto is a vast monumental complex located in the Quarto di San Pietro. It occupies the entire block bounded by Piazza del Palazzo and Via Teofilo Patini to the west, by Corso Principe Umberto to the north, by Corso Vittorio Emanuele to the east, and by Via Sallustio to the south; it also constitutes the western "cantonale" of the Quattro Cantoni.

The complex features three facades – facing Corso Vittorio Emanuele, Corso Principe Umberto, and Piazza del Palazzo – all designed in the same Neoclassical style, though built at different times, characterized by a continuous portico and developed over two levels. Two secondary facades face Via Teofilo Patini and Via Sallustio.

The interior, divided into several buildings, includes the Salvatore Tommasi Provincial Library – established in 1842 and considered the main library in Abruzzo, with an estimated collection of 250,000 volumes – and the National Boarding School Domenico Cotugno, which preserves among its rooms the cell of Bernardino of Siena, the only part that survived the demolition of the Convent of San Francesco. Particularly notable is the palace's artistic heritage, including the fresco L'Aquila by Teofilo Patini (1883) located on the vault of the Royal Lyceum's main hall, now called Sala Patini.

== Bibliography ==
- L'Aquila. Una città d'arte da salvare – Saving an Art City [L'Aquila. An Art City to Save] (in Italian). Pescara: Carsa. 2009.
- Un palazzo, una città [A Palace, a City] (in Italian). L'Aquila: GTE. 2002.
- Antonini, Orlando (2010). Architettura religiosa aquilana [Aquilan Religious Architecture] (in Italian). Todi (Pg): Tau Editrice.
- Clementi, Alessandro; Piroddi, Elio (1986). L'Aquila [L'Aquila] (in Italian). Bari: Laterza.
- Mario Moretti and Marilena Dander, Architettura civile aquilana dal XIV al XIX secolo, L'Aquila, Japadre Editore, 1974.
- Touring Club Italiano (2005). L'Italia – Abruzzo e Molise [Italy – Abruzzo and Molise] (in Italian). Milano: Touring Editore.
