= Camard =

Camard is a French surname. Notable people with the surname include:

- René Camard (1887–1915), French footballer
- Sophie Camard (born 1972), French politician

== See also ==
- Camarda (surname)
