= 1461 L'Aquila earthquake =

Earthquake in the Abruzzo region of Italy

- Location within Italy Location within Abruzzo
- Local date: 27 November 1461
- Magnitude: 6.4
- Epicenter: 42.308°N 13.543°E
- Areas affected: Italy (Abruzzo region)
- Max. intensity: MMI IX (Violent)
- Casualties: ≥ 80 deaths

On 27 November 1461, a powerful earthquake and series of aftershocks struck Italy's Abruzzo region along the Aterno River. The tremors caused widespread damage to Abruzzo's capital, L'Aquila, and the surrounding villages. At least 80 people are recorded to have died and numerous people were injured by the earthquakes. The quakes also caused major, permanent damage to religious sites and changed politics for L'Aquila and the Abruzzo region.

== Tectonic setting ==
The Central Apennines are currently undergoing southwest–northeast directed extension. This has resulted in a series of northwest–southeast trending normal faults and associated sedimentary basins, mainly half-graben in type. The current period of extensional tectonics began in the Pliocene, replacing the previously active thrust tectonics that had resulted from collision between the Apennine continental lithosphere (rifted off Eurasia) and the Adriatic plate. The current extension is thought to be caused by trench rollback of Adriatic oceanic lithosphere. The earlier set of thrust faults also have a northwest–southeast trend and some of these structures may have been directly reactivated during the subsequent extension.

The area has been affected by many historical earthquakes resulting from this active extension, including the 1703 and 2009 earthquakes.

== Earthquake ==
The sequence began when a foreshock hit the Aterno River valley on 16 November before two much larger tremors struck on the 27th, a few hours apart beginning at 21:05 (although some historical sources say just after 05:00). The main shock had an estimated magnitude of 6.4, with its epicenter very close to the village of Poggio Picenze near the Aterno river south-east of L'Aquila. The quake sent many residents of Abruzzo running out of their houses in the night, and two hours later it was followed by a powerful aftershock which further destroyed L'Aquila's already severely-damaged buildings. Aftershocks continued very frequently into mid-December and proved ruinous for the region. Around 20:00 on 17 December another strong aftershock collapsed more houses in L'Aquila, leaving more residents homeless and fearful of further collapses.

Destruction was also very severe in Abruzzo's countryside. The villages of Poggio Picenze, Onna, Sant'Eusanio Forconese, Castelnuovo and their castles (all within 8 kilometers of the main shock's epicenter) were completely wiped out by the violent shaking. Many residents of L'Aquila and the surrounding villages fled into the countryside to makeshift encampments, prudent of aftershocks. Quakes continued to plague the Abruzzo region into March 1462, causing much panic and paranoia among the population. Many residents refused to return to their unstable homes because of the frequent tremors, opting to transfer their tents from the countryside into town squares to avoid collapsing masonry.

== Aftermath ==
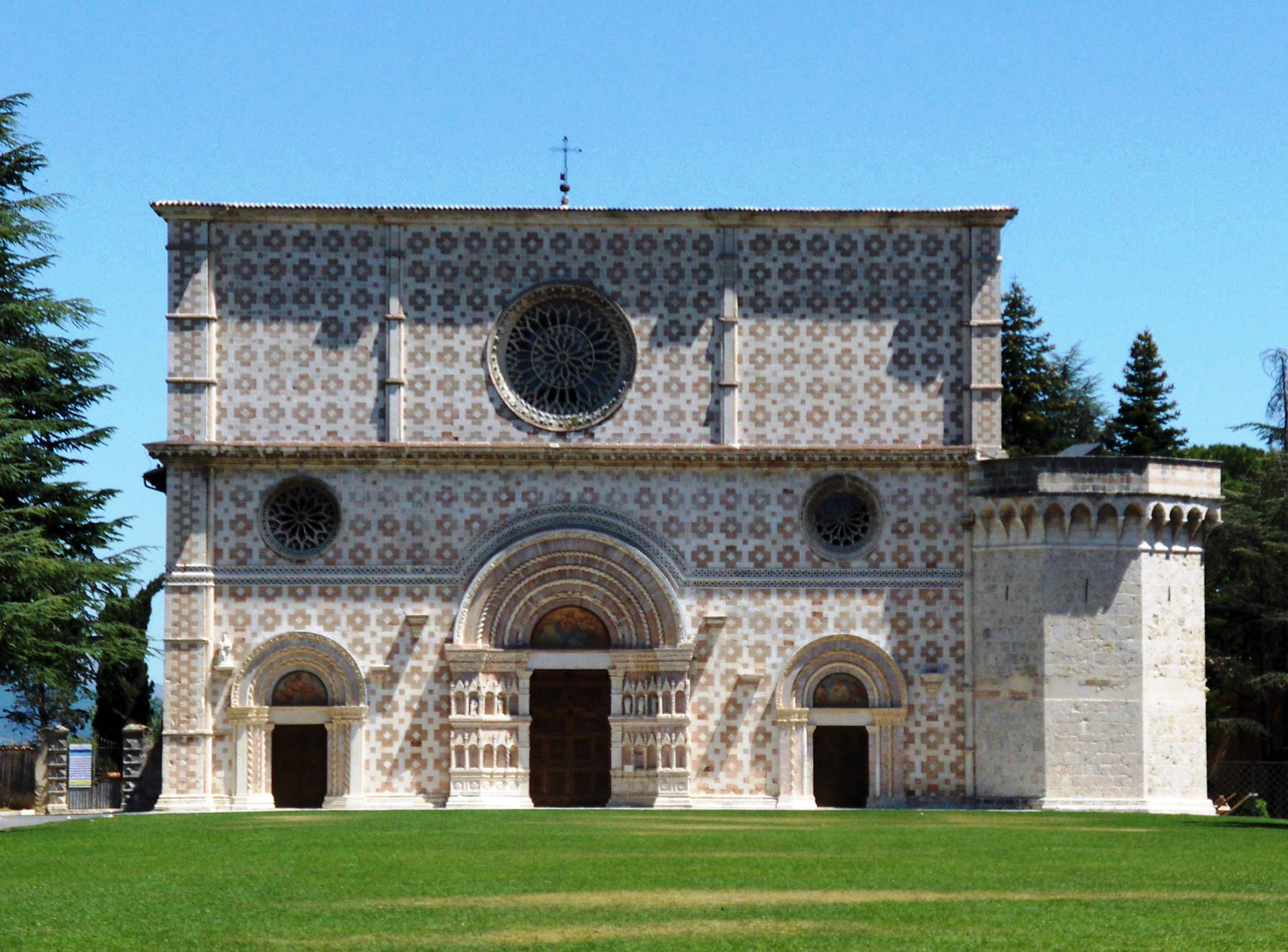
The dome of Santa Maria di Collemaggio collapsed.

At least 80 people are believed to have died in L'Aquila in the main earthquake and aftershocks. Many of the city's churches suffered partial collapses including Santo Dominico, Santo Francisco, Santo Agostina, and Santo Salvestro. The dome of Santa Maria di Collemaggio collapsed, as well as many of the ceiling vaults of the hospital. A side of Santo Massimo collapsed onto and destroyed an adjacent bishopry. A bell tower also collapsed in the Santa Maria district. 26% of L'Aquila's buildings totally collapsed in the quakes and more than 60% suffered partial collapses or serious damage. 70% of L'Aquila's destroyed buildings were on the western half of the city around the districts of San Giovanni and San Pierto, which took on the greatest damage.

The earthquakes also had strong socio-political consequences. The obliterated villages and damaged city bordered the Kingdom of Naples, and military correspondence from an agent to the Duke of Milan reveals that preachers used the earthquake as propaganda to intimidate the population of Abruzzo into obedience to the King of Naples, Ferdinand I of Aragon.
