= Santa Maria Assunta, Assergi =

Church in Assergi, Italy

Santa Maria Assunta
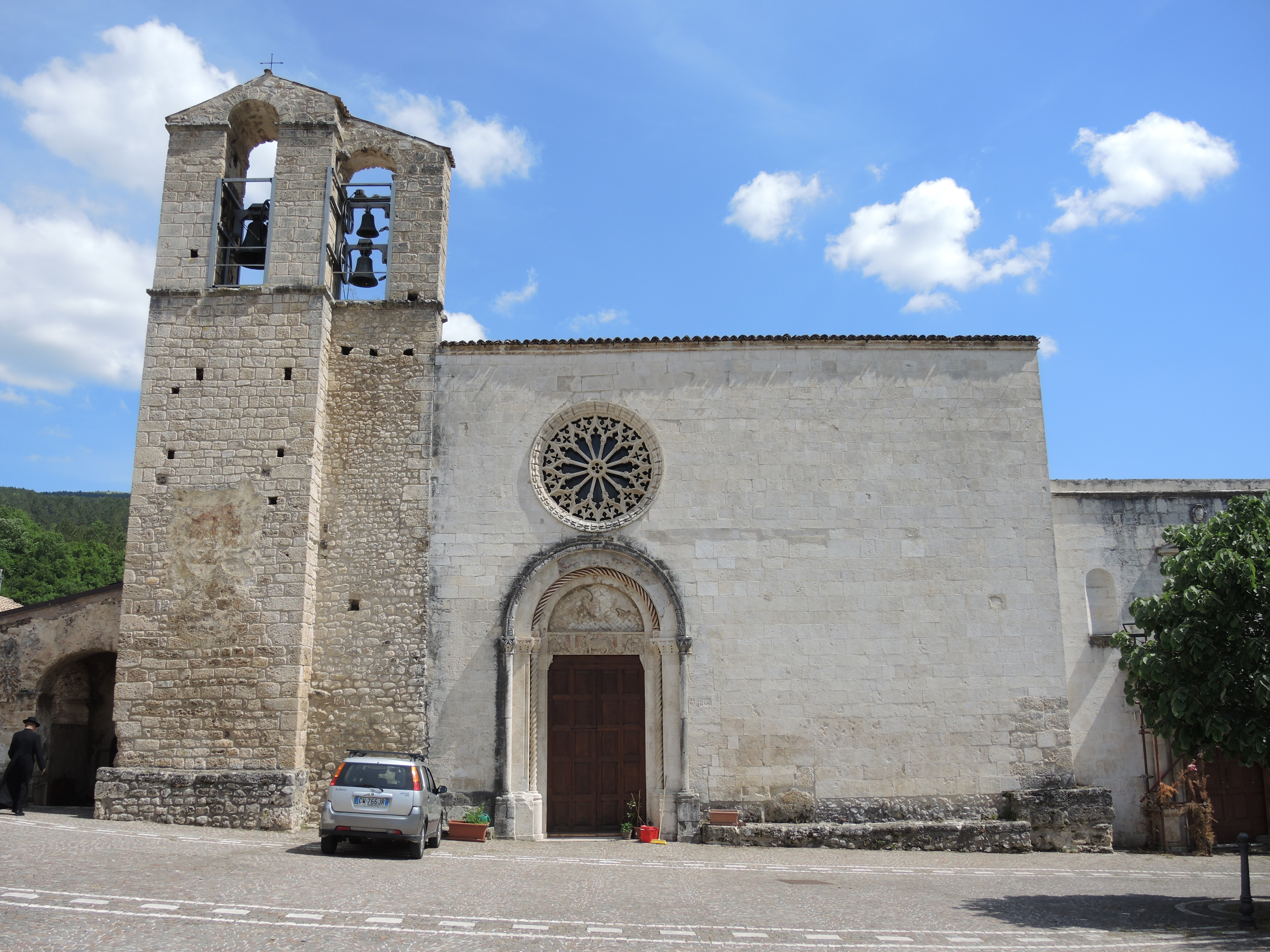

Religion
- Affiliation: Roman Catholic Church

Location
- Location: Assergi, Italy
- Interactive map of Santa Maria Assunta
- Coordinates: 42°24′46″N 13°30′15″E

Architecture
- Type: Church
- Style: Romanesque

Santa Maria Assunta or St Mary of the Assumption is a Romanesque-style church in Assergi, central Italy.

== Background ==
The church was erected in the 12th century, originally part of a larger monastery founded by Saint Equizio. The 15th-century white stone facade is simple, with a portal with a rounded tympanum, surmounted by a rose window. The architrave of the portal has two coats of arms of the town with a lamb, symbol of Christ. The elements are similar to those of other churches in L'Aquila.

The interior was refurbished over the centuries. There are few windows to brighten the interior. There are several Renaissance-style frescos and a crypt, which is from the ancient church of San Franco of Assergi, the patron saint of the town. The crypt is dug from the rock and contains three naves; the medieval reliquary once on this altar putatively held the relics of the saint.
