= Camarda (surname) =

Camarda is a surname. Notable people with the surname include:

- Charles Camarda (born 1952), American engineer and astronaut
- Demetrio Camarda (1821–1882), Albanian linguist
- Francesco Camarda (born 2008), Italian footballer
- Jake Camarda (born 1999), American football punter
- Alessandra Camarda, Italian volleyball player

== See also ==
- Camarda
