= Bagno, L'Aquila =

Coordinates: 42°18′35″N 13°25′29″E

Bagno
- Frazione
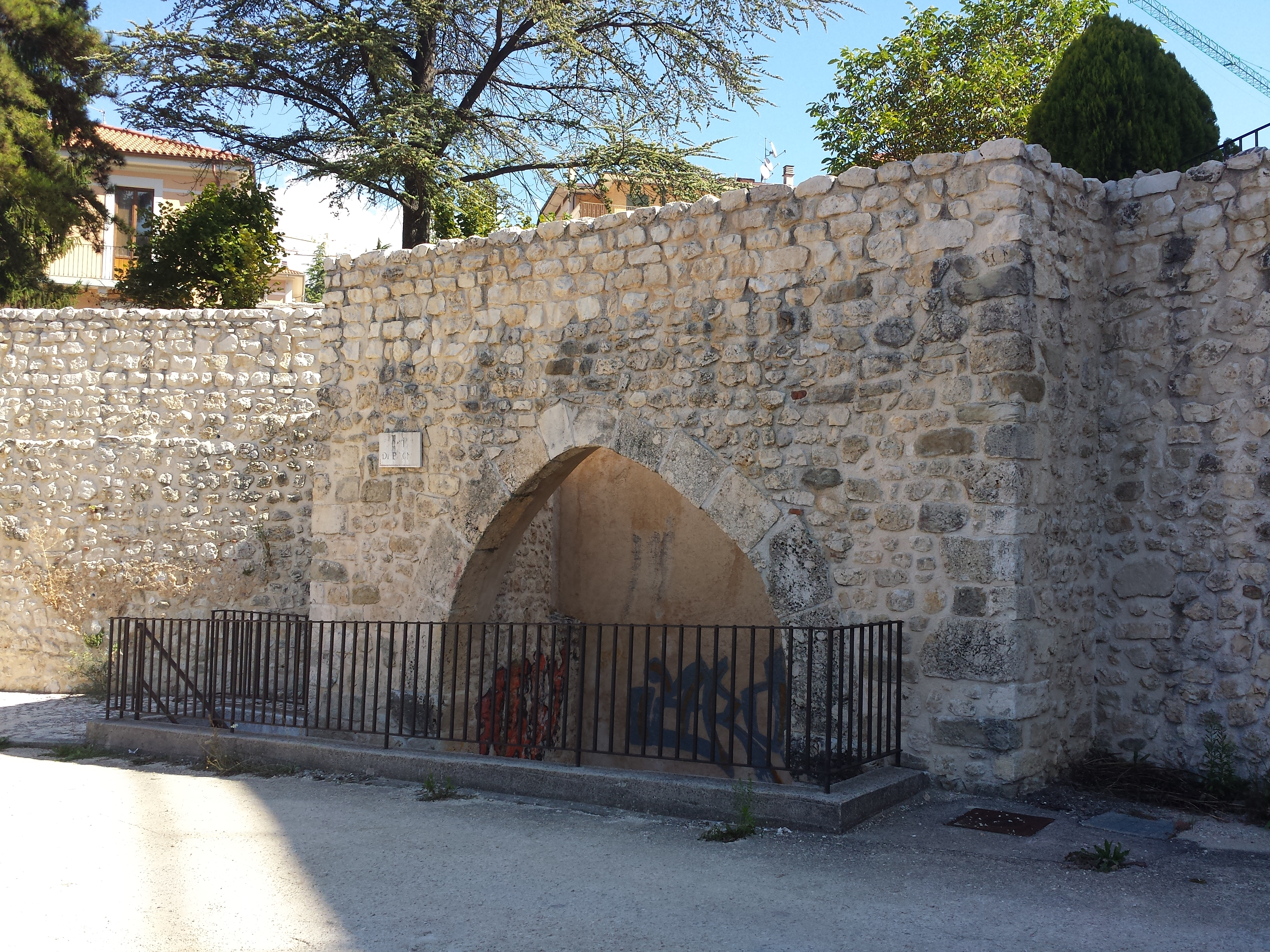
- Interactive map of Bagno
- Country: Italy
- Region: Abruzzo
- Province: L'Aquila (AQ)
- Commune: L'Aquila
- Time zone: UTC+1 (CET)
  - Summer (DST): UTC+2 (CEST)

Bagno is a frazione of L'Aquila in the Abruzzo region of Italy. There are Medieval ruins that are of historical interest.
