= Royo =

Royo (Spanish pronunciation: [ˈro.ʝo]) is a surname of Spanish origin. Notable people with the surname include:

- Andre Royo (born 1968), American actor, producer, and writer
- Adela Ruiz de Royo (1943–2019), Spanish-born Panamanian mathematics academic and educator
- Ángel Royo (born 1966), Spanish football manager
- Antonio Royo Marín (1913–2005), Spanish Dominican priest and theologian
- Arístides Royo (born 1940), Panamanian politician
- Fernando Pérez Royo (born 1943), Spanish academic and politician
- Josep Royo (born 1945), Catalan contemporary artist
- Laura Royo (born 1999), Spanish football player
- Luis Royo (born 1954), Spanish artist
- Manel Royo (born 1994), Spanish football player
- Manuela Royo Letelier (born 1982), Chilean historian and lawyer
- Maria Alejandra Royo (born 2001), Panamanian beauty pageant titleholder
- Reyna Royo (born 1971), Panamanian model and beauty pageant contestant
- Romulo Royo (born 1976), Spanish contemporary artist
- Rubén Royo (born 1987), Spanish football player
