= 1703 Apennine earthquakes =

Series of earthquakes in Italy

- Local date: 14 January 1703
- Magnitude: 6.7–6.2–6.7 M_{L}
- Epicenter: 42.7°N 13.07°E (first event)
- Areas affected: Italy
- Casualties: 10,000 deaths

The 1703 Apennine earthquakes were a sequence of three earthquakes of magnitude ≥6 that occurred in the central Apennines of Italy, over a period of 19 days. The epicenters were near Norcia (14 January), Montereale (16 January) and L'Aquila (2 February), showing a southwards progression over about 36 kilometres (22 mi). These events involved all of the known active faults between Norcia and L'Aquila. A total of about 10,000 people are estimated to have died as a result of these earthquakes, although because of the overlap in areas affected by the three events, casualty numbers remain highly uncertain.

== Tectonic setting ==
The central part of the Apennines has been characterised by extensional tectonics since the Pliocene epoch (i.e. about the last 5 million years), with most of the active faults being normal in type and NW-SE trending. The extension is due to the back-arc basin in the Tyrrhenian Sea opening faster than the African plate is colliding with the Eurasian plate.

== The Norcia earthquake ==
The earthquake occurred at 18:00 UTC on 14 January with an estimated magnitude of 6.7. It was caused by movement on an en echelon set of three normal faults, known as the Norcia Fault System.

=== Damage ===
There was extensive damage in the area around Norcia, with Spoleto and Rieti also affected. Modern estimates give a maximum Mercalli intensity of XI (Extreme). Ground rupture was observed at several locations and these have been confirmed by modern investigations.

=== Casualties ===
Estimates of the death toll vary from 6,240 to 9,761.

== The Montereale earthquake ==
The earthquake occurred at 13:30 UTC on 16 January with an estimated magnitude of 6.2. It is thought to have been caused by movement on the Montereale Fault. Damage was recorded in Montereale, Cittareale, Accumoli and Amatrice. Although of lower magnitude than the other two events, this earthquake was still felt in Rome. The estimated intensity for this event is VIII (Severe). No separate casualty figures are available for this event.

== The L'Aquila earthquake ==
The earthquake occurred at 11:05 UTC on 2 February with an estimated magnitude of 6.7. It was caused by movement on the Mt. Marine Fault.

=== Damage ===
Most of the buildings in L’Aquila were badly damaged or completely destroyed. Damage was reported from as far away as Rome. Modern estimates give a maximum intensity of X (Extreme). The earthquake caused a huge landslide on the Mt. Marine ridge, a large slope failure near Posta and liquefaction along the Aterno River.

=== Casualties ===
Estimates of the death toll vary from 2,500 to 5,000.

== Summary of earthquakes ==
Details taken from Catalogue of Strong Earthquakes in Italy (461 BC – 1997) and Mediterranean Area (760 B.C. – 1500)

Name	Date	Time	Coordinates	Magnitude	Intensity
Norcia	14 January	18:00	42.70°N 13.07°E	6.7	XI
Montereale	16 January	13:30	42.62°N 13.10°E	6.2	VIII
L'Aquila	2 February	11:05	42.43°N 13.30°E	6.7	X

== Relationship between the events ==
Some seismologists interpret these events as related. It has been suggested that the Norcia earthquake led directly to the Montereale event, which had the effect of further loading the fault at Aquila, thus triggering the final event. Such sequential adjacent events are examples of coulomb stress transfer.

== See also ==
- 2009 L'Aquila earthquake
- 1706 Abruzzo earthquake
- 1461 L'Aquila earthquake
- List of earthquakes in Italy
- List of historical earthquakes
