= Rojo =

Rojo may refer to:

== People ==
- Rojo (surname)

== Music ==
- Rojo (band), a Mexican Christian rock band
  - Rojo (Rojo album), 2001
- Rojo (Red Garland album), 1961
- "Rojo", a song by J Balvin from Colores, 2020
- Rojo, an album by Río Roma, 2020

== Arts and media ==
- Rojo (film), a 2018 Argentine drama film
- Rojo (TV series), a Chilean reality television competition series
- Rojo.com, a web-based news aggregator
- Rojo, a recurring villain in the Ben 10 franchise
