= Arischia =

Coordinates: 42°25′07″N 13°20′32″E

- Frazione
- Interactive map of Arischia
- Country: Italy
- Region: Abruzzo
- Province: L'Aquila (AQ)
- Commune: L'Aquila
- Time zone: UTC+1 (CET)
  - Summer (DST): UTC+2 (CEST)

Arischia is a frazione in the Province of L'Aquila in the Abruzzo region of Italy.

== History ==
During the Second World War, the Abruzzo region was on the front lines between the Nazi-Occupied North, and the advancing Allies to the south. Abruzzo was a centre of Partisan activity against the Fascists and Nazi Occupation. The first Partisan unit in L'Acquila was founded in Arischia by Antonio D’Ascenzo in the summer of 1943.
