= Roio =

Roio Roiani Rojo
- Frazione
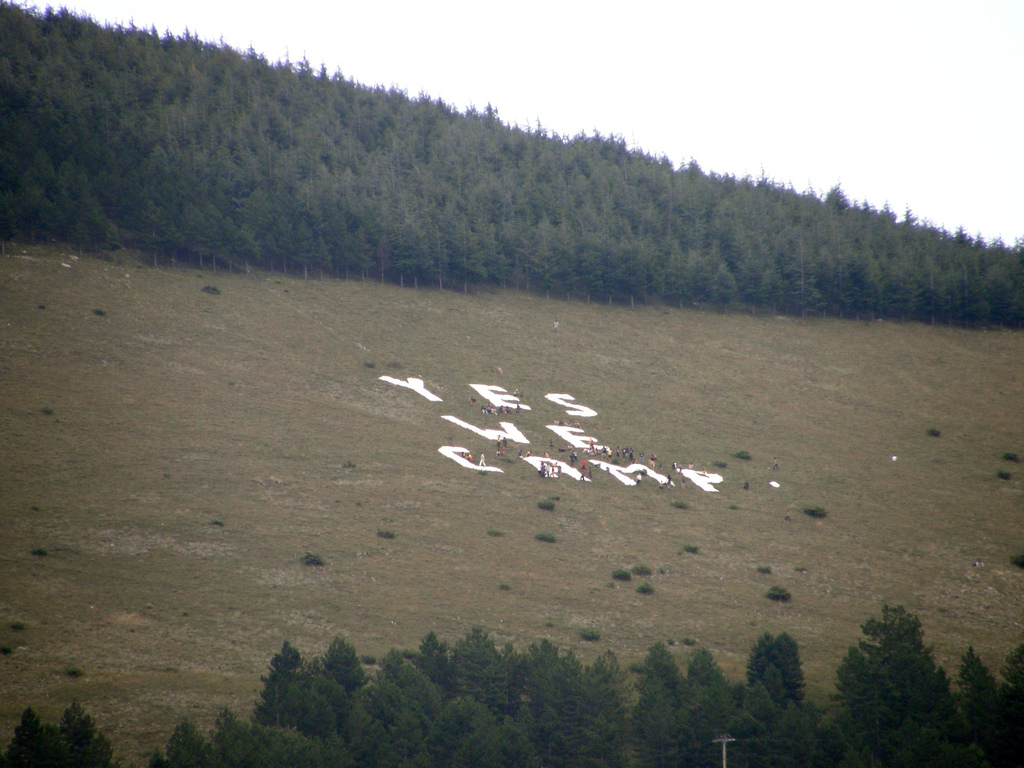
- "Yes we camp" - 35th G8 summit - L'Aquila 2009
- Interactive map of Roio
- Coordinates: 42°19′55″N 13°22′48″E
- Country: Italy
- Region: Abruzzo
- Province: L'Aquila
- Commune: L'Aquila
- Elevation: 2,726 ft (831 m)

Population (2001)
  - Total: 733
- Time zone: UTC+1 (CET)
  - Summer (DST): UTC+2 (CEST)
- Postal code: 67040

Roio is a frazione of L'Aquila in the Abruzzo, region of Italy. Hiking is a popular activity in and around Roio.
