= Paganica =

- Frazione
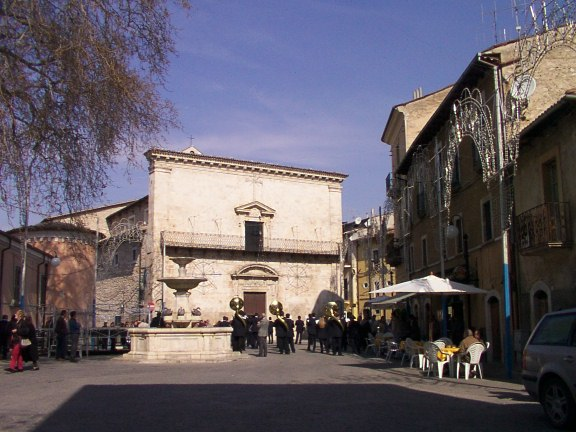
- The main square and the church of Santa Maria Assunta in Paganica

- Location of Paganica in Italy
- Coordinates: 42°21′34″N 13°28′13″E
- Country: Italy
- Region: Abruzzo
- Province: L'Aquila (AQ)
- Comune: L'Aquila
- Elevation: 669 m (2,195 ft)

Population (December 31, 2009)
  - Total: 9,873
- Demonym: Paganichesi
- Time zone: UTC+1 (CET)
  - Summer (DST): UTC+2 (CEST)
- Postal code: 67100
- Dialing code: 0862
- Website: Official website

Paganica is a hillside town in the province of L'Aquila, in the Abruzzo region of southern Italy. located at 669 meters above sea level, at the foot of the Gran Sasso d'Italia, about 7 kilometers east of the historic center, along the state road 17 bis that from Bazzano climbs to Campo Imperatore passing for Tempèra, Camarda, Assergi and Fonte Cerreto, with a population of about 10 000 inhabitants, making it the largest fraction of the city, as well as of considerable economic importance. It is a frazione of the comune of L'Aquila (which is some 7 km far), and has a population of about 5,000.

On April 6, 2009, the center was hit by a disastrous earthquake which caused heavy damage to the town (including a burst water pipe, which caused a landslide), resulting in an almost total evacuation. In 2011 the restoration works began, which have recovered part of the historical heritage, and the influx of the population.

== History ==
An old Roman city, in 1254 its citizens took part in the foundation of L'Aquila by Manfred of Sicily. Until 1927 it was an autonomous municipality merged, with others, into L'Aquila.

On April 6, 2009, Paganica was severely damaged, with 70 percent of its buildings destroyed, as a result of the 2009 L'Aquila earthquake. The earthquake's epicenter was along the road between L'Aquila and Paganica, Paganica being the closest town to the epicenter.

== Culture ==
=== Events ===
Corsa del cappello

The Corsa del cappello (Hat Race) is a relay race in which the baton to be exchanged is a hat. A similar competition took place in past centuries during the Feast of Sant'Antonio Abate (January 17). Many years ago the event was reborn and the contending teams come from the four historic districts of the country. More recently, it was extended to the hamlets of the former municipality of Paganica. For many years the race has been held in mid-July, within numerous events.

== Main sights ==
- Sanctuary of Madonna d'Appari (14th century), built directly on the rock and characterized by precious frescoes from later centuries.
- The Romanesque Basilica of San Giustino (8th–12th centuries)
- Church of Santa Maria Assunta, of Franco-Lombard origin, rebuilt in the 17th century. The façade is from 1655.
- The Ducal Palace and the Gothic House (14th century) nearby.

== Transport ==
Paganica has a station on the Terni–Sulmona railway, with trains to L'Aquila and Sulmona.

== Notable people ==
- Mario Zugaro (born 1934). Famous for spiced salami.

== See also ==
- 2009 L'Aquila earthquake
