= Roio Piano =

- Frazione
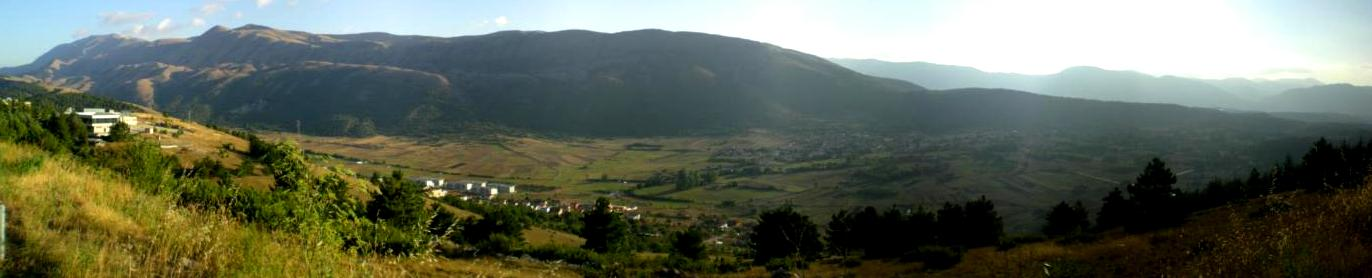
- The plan of Roio Piano, with the frazione visible at the center.
- Interactive map of Roio Piano
- Coordinates: 42°19′52″N 13°21′20″E
- Country: Italy
- Region: Abruzzo
- Province: L'Aquila (AQ)
- Commune: L'Aquila
- Elevation: 810 m (2,660 ft)

Population (2001)
  - Total: 520
- Demonym: Roiani
- Time zone: UTC+1 (CET)
  - Summer (DST): UTC+2 (CEST)

Roio Piano is a frazione of L'Aquila in the Abruzzo, region of Italy. In the 13th century it was one of the fortified settlements which formed the city of L'Aquila, although Roio maintained a degree of autonomy and, later, a separate comune until 1927.

The destructive and deadly 2009 Abruzzo earthquake was felt in Roio Piano.

== See also ==
- Earthquakes in Italy
