= Onna, L'Aquila =

Coordinates: 42.328889°N 13.48°E

Onna
- Frazione
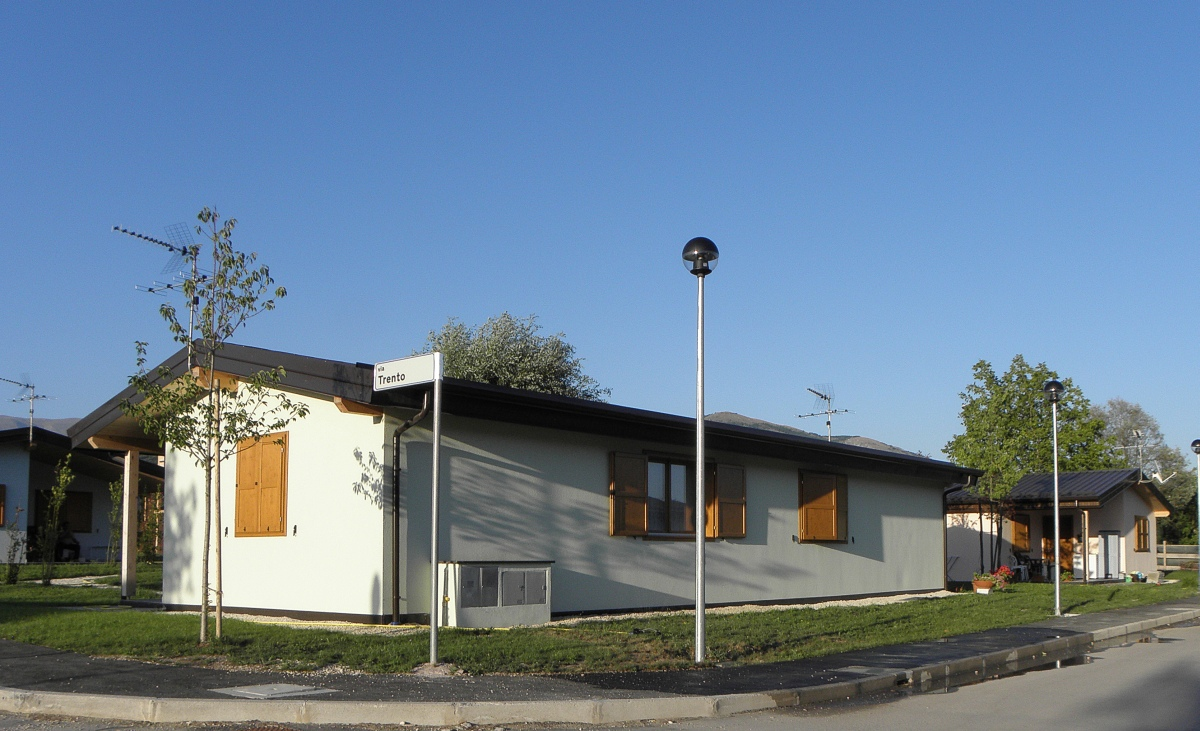

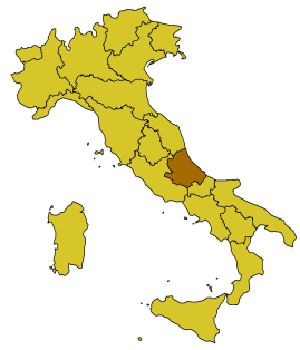
- Country: Italy
- Region: Abruzzo
- Province: L'Aquila
- Commune: L'Aquila
- Elevation: 582 m (1,909 ft)
- Time zone: UTC+1 (CET)
  - Summer (DST): UTC+2 (CEST)
- Postal code: 67100

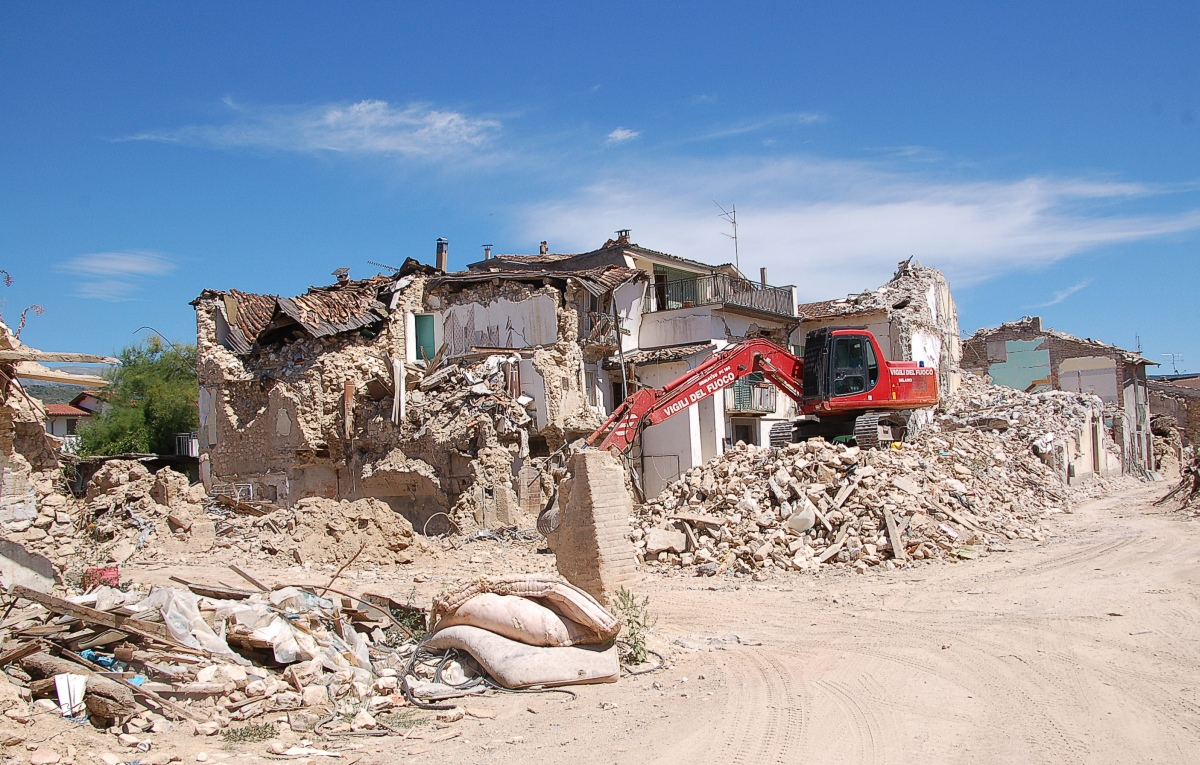
Onna, 2010

Onna is a frazione of L'Aquila in the Abruzzo, region of central Italy. It is situated in the Apennine Mountain Range, 582 m (1,909 ft) above sea level. The population is about 300 people.

== Early history ==
The area has been inhabited for approximately 1,000 years. It is probable that initially it did not have a defined city structure. During the Roman conquest, the fertility of the area guaranteed food production for Rome.

The earliest record of Onna is in 1178 during the time of Pope Clement III, in Villa Unda. Onna is mentioned again by Pope Innocent III in 1204. Aside from these two records, the early history of the area is a mystery. There existed a "grancia" (a type of agricultural company detached from the convent) run by the Cistercian monks.

== Modern history ==
A girl was killed by the German occupation forces on 2 June 1944. Nine days later, a large-scale massacre occurred in which 16 persons were killed. This act of retaliation was perpetrated by the 114th Jäger Division, led by Hans Boelsen. One-third of the village was also destroyed.

On 6 April 2009, 85% of Onna's territory was destroyed. Other villages were severely damaged as a result of the 2009 L'Aquila earthquake. At least 40 people died in Onna.
