= Aragno =

Coordinates: 42°23′44″N 13°27′29″E

- Frazione
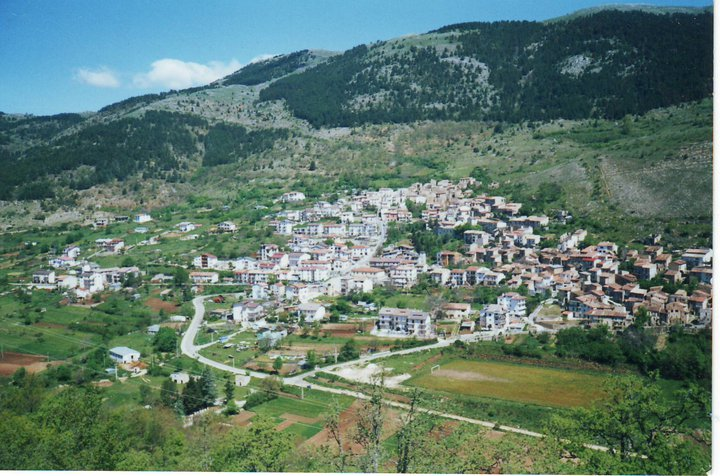
- Aragno
- Interactive map of Aragno
- Country: Italy
- Region: Abruzzo
- Province: L'Aquila
- Time zone: UTC+1 (CET)
  - Summer (DST): UTC+2 (CEST)

Aragno is a frazione in the Province of L'Aquila in the Abruzzo region of Italy.
