= Poggio Picenze =

Municipality in Abruzzo, Italy

- Comune
- Comune di Poggio Picenze
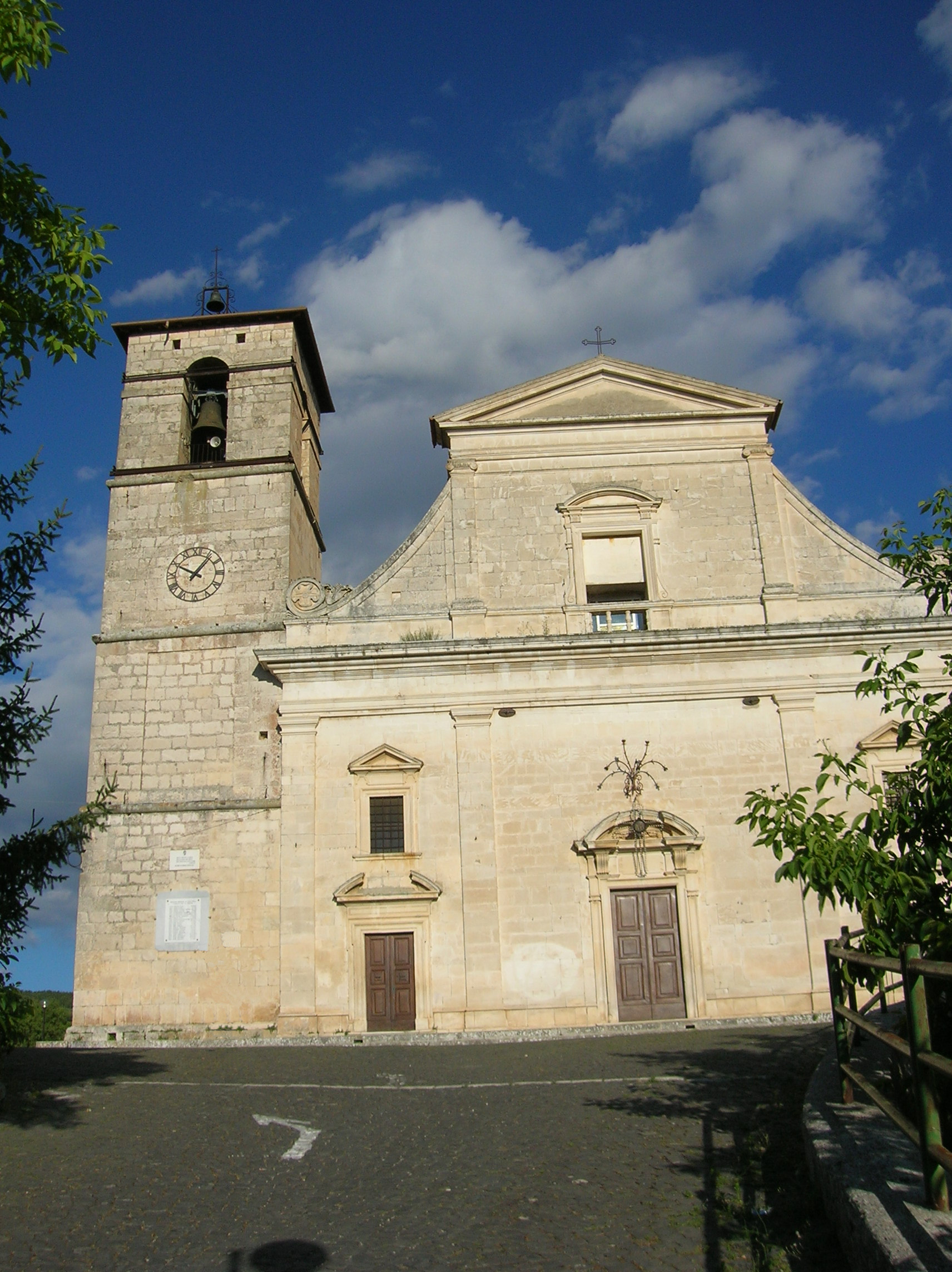
- Church of San Felice Martire.

- Coat of arms

- Location within Italy Location within Abruzzo
- Coordinates: 42°19′18″N 13°32′31″E
- Country: Italy
- Region: Abruzzo
- Province: L’Aquila

Government
  - Mayor: Antonello Gialloreto

Area
  - Total: 11.61 km^{2} (4.48 sq mi)
- Elevation: 756 m (2,480 ft)

Population (31 December 2010)
  - Total: 1,068
  - Density: 91.99/km^{2} (238.3/sq mi)
- Demonym: Poggiani
- Time zone: UTC+1 (CET)
  - Summer (DST): UTC+2 (CEST)
- Postal code: 67026
- Dialing code: 0862
- Patron saint: St. Felix
- Saint day: June 18
- Website: Official website

Poggio Picenze (Abruzzese: Rù Poje) is a comune and town in the province of L'Aquila in the Abruzzo region of Italy. Poggio Picenze is a small city with about 1,000 inhabitants. Located on Italy's Highway 17, it is 14 kilometres (9 mi) from the Abruzzese Apennines and about 12 kilometres (7 mi) from the city of L'Aquila. It sits 760 metres (2,490 ft) above sea level and overlooks the Aquila basin. It is also part of the mountain community of Campo Imperatore-Piana Navelli.

== Geography ==
This farming town has the characteristic of being divided into two distinct urban areas. The region is known for the numerous white limestone quarries that mined and processed the "La Pietra del Poggio" (White Stone). Its white gentle appearance and its physical characteristics make it easy to work with, but moreover, it also has the properties of being hardened and covered with a golden patina over time. Due to this resource and the work of master masons of Poggio were authors of hundreds of ornate doorways, balconies, patios, porches, fountains, and eagles.

== History ==
Poggio Picenze's name derives from the ancient castle which was built on the side of Mount Picenze, the name derives in turn from Piceni, also called Picentia, which established several settlements in the area around the 3rd century B.C. The date of the castle dates back to around the year 1000, it is referenced in documents around 1173. "Podio de Picentia” had fortified walls and six towers, including one high in the middle. Remains of the castle are still visible in the old part of town.

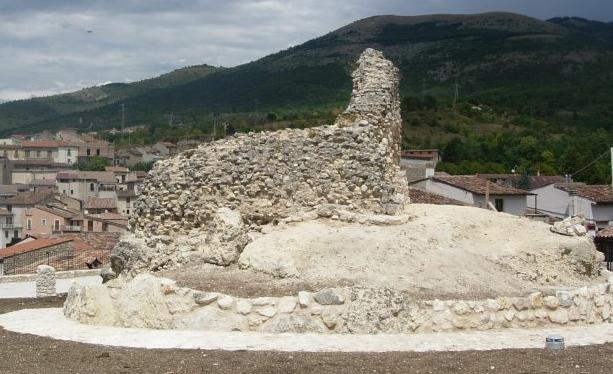
The remains of Podio de Picentia castle

=== Pre-feudal era ===
Poggio Picenze castle's position repeatedly exposed it to raids. In 1423, the castle withstood the siege for two long days by Braccio da Montone, giving time for the denizens to organize resistance, but eventually capitulated before the ruthless conqueror. One of the castles of the Contado Aquilano (L’Aquila Countryside), was given by Emperor Charles the V, after a peasant rebellion in 1533 to Antonio Aldana; later it belonged to the Alfieri family from L'Aquila.

=== Feudal era ===
Poggio Picenze was assigned to the Spaniard Giagiacomo of Léognan Castriota, a talented leader who in 1566 settled there in preference to all his many possessions. After Léognan, the estate passed in the 18th century to the Marquis De Sterlich of Chieti, Italy. The town was badly damaged in the October 6th, 1762 earthquake and required substantial reconstruction work. In 1806, the era of feudalism endeded, and Poggio Picenze's castle was partially demolished in 1832 as it became unsafe due to continual earthquakes.

=== Modern era ===
In the late 19th century, Poggio Picenze would experience out migration that affected most of Italy, where 75 percent of the population would leave in the span of a century. Despite air raids on nearby L’Aquila during World War II, Poggio Picenze's historical buildings remained relatively unscathed.

In 2009, Poggio Picenze would suffer fatalities from an earthquake that occurred at 3:32 local time (1:32 UTC) on 6 April 2009, and was rated 5.8 on the Richter scale and 6.3 on the moment magnitude scale; its epicenter was near L'Aquila, the capital of Abruzzo, which together with surrounding villages suffered the most damage. There have been several thousand aftershocks since, and more than thirty of which had a Richter magnitude greater than 3.5.

== Main sights ==
=== Fontana di San Rocco ===
The fountain is bounded by a staircase and is characterized by two tanks closed in niches with three columns topped by capitals. The tanks are supported by small piers.

=== Chiesa di San Felice Martire ===
The parish church is dedicated to Saint Felix the Martyr. It was originally built around the mid-15th century, and suffered severe damage during the earthquake of 1762 but was soon rebuilt and enlarged. Its stone façade of the late 16th century was finally restored in 1870 with local stone.

The interior has a nave and two aisles divided by columns, with a Baroque-Classical style interior altars, statues and paintings. The altar is dedicated to St. John and was the work of Renaissance master Thomas Rocco of Vicenza.

=== Chiesa Della Visitazione ===
This church was built between the 15th and 16th centuries. Its facade is Romanesque, whose upper part has a crucifix in high relief. In the early 20th century, farmers attended the Mass before going to work in the fields.

=== Church of San Giuliano di San Rocco ===
This church's construction dates from the early 15th century, where previously there was a small hospital until 1447. It had a simple design with crisp front and pilasters in local stone, the interior has a single aisle with tettoe ceiling in wood. The church of San Rocco while notable, was destroyed by an earthquake January 13, 1915.

== Festivals and events ==
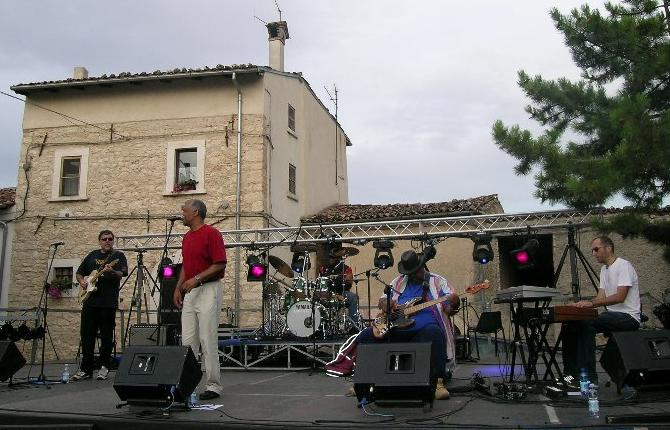
Poggio Picenze in Blues Music Festival

Many cultural events of Poggio Picenze take place throughout the summer.

=== Poggio Picenze in Blues ===
A popular festival is the "Poggio Picenze in Blues," which is held traditionally on the second weekend of July. It is a music festival featuring rhythm and blues in the town square. The square's acoustics with medieval architecture make it popular with musicians.

=== Feast of the Patron Saint San Felice ===
On June 18 the feast of the patron saint is celebrated. In the morning, the faithful attend a Mass in his honor, then the festival committee members take place the effigy in a case which was donated by the city of Girona, Catalonia (Spain). The climax of the festival, La Banda Musicale (Music band) and bonfires announce the opening of the reliquary. The Saint is placed on the dais to be carried in a procession through the streets of the city. After completing the course, traditional gunfire announces that the saint made his appearance to the city and is ready to return to church.

=== Sagra Degli Spizzichi E Della Pecora Alla Chiaranese (Festival of the Sheep to Chiaranese) ===
This festival is held annually on Friday Saturday and Sunday in the first week of August. Its advent was in the early 1970s and was devoted primarily to those who have migrated out but are still devoted to Poggio Picenze, it is sometimes referred to as "The Emigrant's Week." It celebrates being connected to those who have migrated throughout the world and to welcome them back.

== Sport ==
The town of Poggio Picenze organizes annual sporting events such as running and cycling races. The bowling club offers an elite school bowling club.
