= Filetto =

- Comune
- Comune di Filetto
- Location within Italy Location within Abruzzo
- Coordinates: 42°14′N 14°15′E
- Country: Italy
- Region: Abruzzo
- Province: Chieti (CH)
- Frazioni: Casone Lenzetta, Viano, Calvario, Castagna, Cavallo Morto, Colle Di Sciore

Government
  - Mayor: Sandro Di Tullio (Lista Civica L'aurora filettese)

Area
  - Total: 13 km^{2} (5.0 sq mi)
- Elevation: 403 m (1,322 ft)

Population (2018-01-01)
  - Total: 930
  - Density: 72/km^{2} (190/sq mi)
- Demonym: Filettesi
- Time zone: UTC+1 (CET)
  - Summer (DST): UTC+2 (CEST)
- Postal code: 66030
- Dialing code: 0871
- ISTAT code: 069032
- Patron saint: San Giacomo
- Saint day: 25 July

Filetto is an Italian comune of 930 people in the Province of Chieti in Abruzzo.

== Physical geography ==
=== Hydrography ===
It's crossed by the Venna stream, which rises near Guardiagrele, runs for 24 km and flows into the river Foro.

=== Seismicity ===
It is located in Seismic Zone 2 (area with medium seismic hazard where strong earthquakes can occur).

=== Climate ===
- Climatic zone D
- Degree day 1801

== Blazon of the coat of arms and the gonfalon ==
=== Coat of arms ===
Red, silver hand contracted and driving from the tip. Under the shield, bifid and fluttering red list, the motto, in Roman capital letters, of gold FIDELITAS LIBERTAS. Exterior ornaments of the Italian Comunes

=== Gonfalon ===
White draped richly adorned with silver embroidery and loaded with the civic coat of arms with the inscription centered in silver, bearing the name of the comune. The metal parts and the cords will be silvered and the vertical rod will be covered with white velvet with spiral places silver tacks. In the arrow will be represented the coat of arms of the comune and on the stem engraved the name. Tie with ribbons of silver fringed national colors.
