= Santa Giusta, L'Aquila =

Church of Santa Giusta
- Chiesa di Santa Giusta
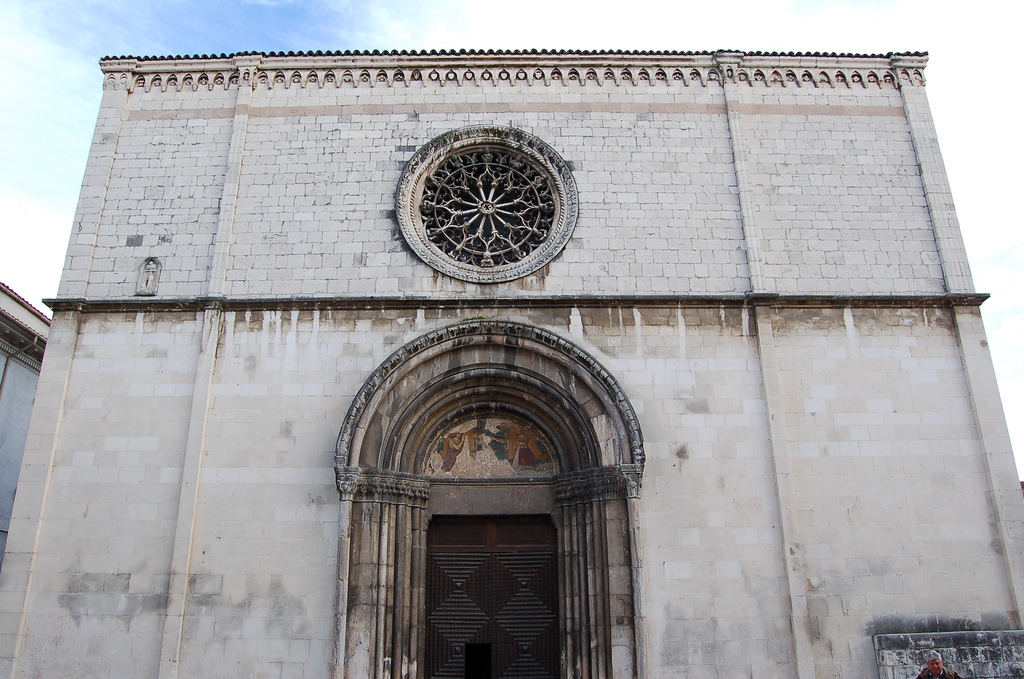
- View of the church

- 42.347139°N 13.399278°E
- Location: (L'Aquila)
- Country: Italy
- Denomination: Catholic

History
- Status: Church

Architecture
- Functional status: Active
- Style: Romanesque
- Completed: 13th century

Administration
- Diocese: Archdiocese of L'Aquila

Chiesa di Santa Giusta (Italian for Church of Santa Giusta) is a Romanesque church in L'Aquila (Abruzzo).

== History ==
The church is one of the oldest in the city, with its foundation dating back to 1254, during the first foundation of L'Aquila, when the building was established as the church of one of the castles founding the new city, that of Bazzano. In this sense, the church is considered even older than the cathedral and was built on the site of a previous church probably dedicated to Saint George and constructed in the 1230s by the castle dwellers of Goriano Valli, from which the name of the historic district where it is located derives, and later restored by residents from Bazzano. This is evidenced by the wall parallel to "via del Grifo", certainly existing before the rest of the building. What is certain is that in 1272 the church was elevated to head of a quart in the framework of the new division promoted by the then Captain of the City Lucchesino da Firenze, positioning itself from then on as one of the main reference poles of the city.

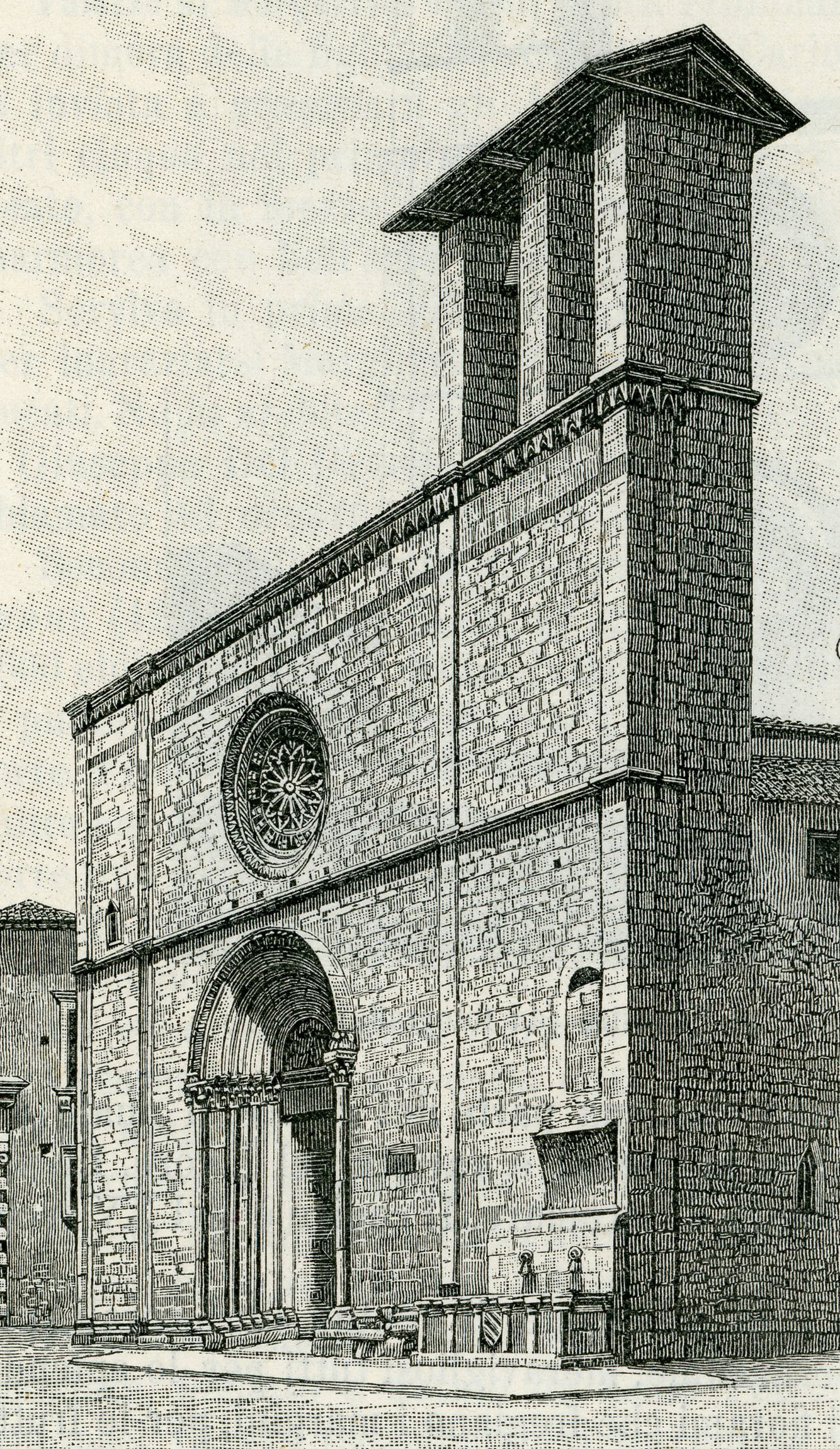
The church in a late 19th-century engraving.

The original plan, with three naves separated by two rows of six arches, leading to the protruding and elevated transept, is typical of the 12th- and 13th-century constructions in L'Aquila and is still readable because the layout and general structure of the church have not been altered over the centuries by extensive renovation works, unlike most other city buildings. The destruction caused by the earthquake of 1315 was mainly limited to the terminal part of the apses and the sanctuary so that, in the immediately following years, the reconstruction of the side apses can be attributed to, transformed from rectangular to polygonal, the construction of the apse, of the main altar, and of the transept, the latter financed by a patronage, Paul of Bazzano. The new realizations were built with irregularity and with a disalignment with respect to the pre-existing naves which has not yet found a certain explanation.

However, the church was again struck by the earthquake of 1349 which this time damaged the facade, perhaps still under construction or just completed, sponsored by another patron, Bonomo di Nicola from Coppito. The work progressed slowly, so much so that in 1367 the chapter was still looking for funds and in fact the facade, of a still almost Romanesque appearance, and the bell tower, begun in 1347, were definitively completed at the beginning of the fifteenth century.

In the fifteenth century, works were carried out mainly concerning the decorative apparatuses and the internal chapels and it is from this period that the realization of the choir in wood placed in the apse is dated. The earthquake of 1461 damaged the building again, which nevertheless remained "solidly standing in its outer walls", causing the collapse of the right nave and serious injuries to the domes of the apses. In 1466 the tribunal was rebuilt and in 1477 the baptismal font was made. In the same period, the central nave was slightly lowered and the previous ribbed vault was no longer rebuilt.

The church subsequently underwent a progressive loss of importance until it became, at the end of the 16th century, in a state of disrepair. In this period the lateral naves began to be transformed into chapels, also realized in the early 17th century. In the first half of the 17th century, under the work of the procurator Scipione Gentile, a significant work of recovery and restoration of the building was started, which also led to the realization of the coffered ceiling (1617) as well as the Alferi chapel and the Mariani chapel and the rebuilding of the Agnifili chapel, resulting in the leading intervention of the Aquilan Baroque and one of the first examples of the reception of the new style in Italy.

The earthquake of 1703 caused significant injuries but did not destroy the building, which was restored starting from 1730 with the rebuilding of the roof over the transept, the reattachment of a nave side and the concealment of the rose window on the facade, replaced by four square windows placed laterally. In 1872 the building was requisitioned to be used as a barracks, but in reality it was used as such only from 1915 to 1919.

In 2009, struck again by the earthquake, the church recorded collapses in the sanctuary area and serious injuries to the walls of the apses and the lateral naves and is currently not accessible; restoration operations of the monument have an estimated total cost of 5,800,000 euros and a work time of 4 years. During the safety works, important frescoes and the remains of the original rose window of the facade were found.

== Architecture ==
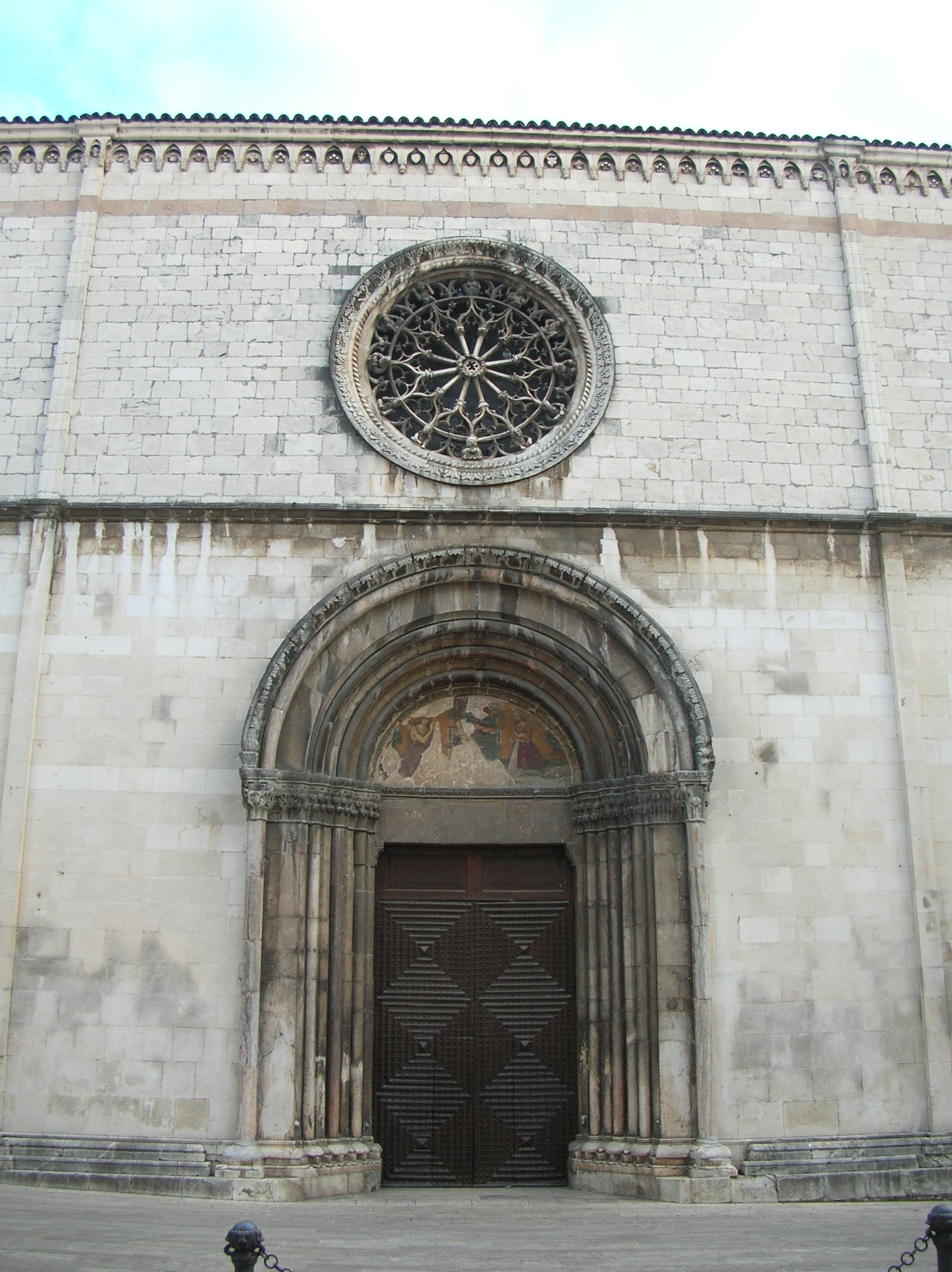
Facade of the Church of Santa Giusta.

The church is located in the heart of the historic center, in the Quarto di San Giorgio, a short distance from Piazza del Duomo and at the head of the homonymous square. Positioned in one of the most important and busy points of L'Aquila between the 13th and 15th centuries, it has been surrounded over time by numerous architectural landmarks such as Palazzo Dragonetti, Palazzo Alfieri, and finally, Palazzo Centi, the epitome of the city's Baroque style.

=== Facade ===
The facade, erected after the earthquake of 1349, features typical architectural and decorative elements of Aquilan religious architecture that are often repeated: below the typical horizontal straight-line termination, adorned with a sequence of Romanesque-Gothic archess, the front is clad in white stone divided into regularly squared and aligned blocks. It is flanked by pilasters on the sides, horizontally divided by a string course, and vertically tripartite by other pilasters that extend beyond the string course, dividing the facade into six panels that also include the portal and the rose window, making it unique in the Aquilan context but also one of the highest achievements before the facade of Collemaggio. The rose window, among the largest and most beautiful in L'Aquila, features refined openwork tracery including twelve human figures in the form of telamons, each with a specific mythological significance. This uniqueness, also isolated within the city context, was already present in some Umbrian thirteenth-century and late-thirteenth-century Apulian roses. A second rose window is visible in the side wall.

The portal, begun in 1347 but completed along with the rose window only in 1403, ends in a distinctly Gothic arch, but round like in other thirteenth-century Aquilan churches. More modern Gothic solutions are instead found in the floral decoration of the capitals, in the brackets supporting the lintel, and in the grouping of the columns into bands. In the lunette is a fresco by Giovanni Antonio da Lucoli depicting the Madonna and Child with Saints John the Baptist and Giusta.

The right vertical band is embellished at the base by a fountain built contemporaneously with the facade itself; the source consists of a rectangular stone basin, framed by eight columns and adorned with the coat of arms of the castle of Bazzano, surmounted by a parapet with two circular fountains from which water flows.

=== Sides ===
The left side of the church, on via del Grifo, is certainly the oldest part of the entire building, perhaps dating back to the early 13th century, like the portal walled with an ogival arch still visible. On the right side, near the transept, is another portal later than the facade, dating to the mid-14th century or the period following the earthquake of 1349.

=== Interior ===
The interior, modified in the 17th century, is partially readable today in its original two-thirteenth-century conformation with three naves separated by two rows of six non-ogival arches according to the Gothic forms in use at that time but round for static reasons, supported by octagonal base columns, similar to those of the basilica of Santa Maria di Collemaggio now incorporated into seventeenth-century pillars. The naves opened through three arches resting on two bundles of pillars of which only the central one remains visible, into a projecting transept and at the end into three apses corresponding to the naves. For reasons still unknown, the new central and left apses were not built in line with the corresponding naves, and the transept was designed to protrude more on the right side.

The church is entirely covered by a wooden ceiling made in 1610 with funding from Annibale and Antonio Alferi, whose names are engraved in the center of the transept ceiling. The central nave is open into five chapels on each side, the result of the transformation of the side naves between the 16th and 17th centuries, each with an altar: the first chapel on the right presents the Martyrdom of Saint Stephen, a canvas attributed to the Cavalier d'Arpino (ancient sources report that the canvas was signed by the painter and dated 1615), while the fourth on the same side contains the Alferi Mausoleum.

The main altar was built in 1740 and consists of a triumphal arch containing a tabernacle and wooden ornaments depicting the Redeemer, the Annunciation, and Saints Giusta and Ursula; beneath it are the relics of Saint Giusta and part of those of Saint Justin, brought there from Bazzano in 1626. In the apse is the wooden choir, the oldest preserved in Abruzzo, dating back to the first quarter of the 15th century, divided into fifteen stalls with backrests decorated with inlaid geometric motifs and with the upper profile ogival decorated with arches. Above is a projecting frame supported by fifteen perforated brackets in which busts of men, animal figures, and decorative elements are carved. A peculiarity of the choir are the four profiled figures carved in relief, depicting three of the four patrons of L'Aquila, Saint Celestine, Saint George and the Dragon, Saint Maximus of Aveia, and Saint Giusta.

In the back wall of the right transept is a fresco of the Annunciation, perhaps from the early 15th century, while on the pillars of the triumphal arch are other frescoes: on the right is a Resurrection and a Coronation of the Virgin, well preserved with other fragments with male and female heads, and on the left is instead a Saint Helena, all works by late Gothic culture and operating within the first thirty years of the 15th century.

In the head of the left transept are other frescoes visible: in the center a fake triptych with Saint George and the Princess in the central panel and, on the sides, Saint Anthony the Abbot with a kneeling man, probably the patron, on the right and Saint Christopher with the Child on his shoulder on the left. The fresco, still imbued with late Gothic refinements and abstractions, interesting also for the view of L'Aquila and Porta Bazzano in the background, can be ascribed to an unidentified painter and dated to the mid-14th century. In another fresco not in the best state of conservation, adjacent to the triptych, is depicted the same presumed patron, depicted bust-length and dressed in the same red and white banded robe and with a helmet and shield beside him identifying him as a knight. At the bottom left is another fresco in a niche with a Lamentation over the Deposed Christ, already dated to the mid-16th century and attributed to Pompeo Cesura, but more likely from the early century and close to the work of Saturnino Gatti. To the right of the entrance is another fresco with the Madonna and Child with Saint Anthony, also of late Gothic culture, in poor condition.

On the left, the fifth chapel houses the Nativity of Jesus attributed to Giulio Cesare Bedeschini, while the fourth features a fresco depicting the Madonna and Child (17th century). In the transept are visible, on the left, remains of fourteenth- and fifteenth-century frescoes and on the right the de Torres Mausoleum, named after the Spanish family related to the Aquilan Dragonetti, with the Martyrdom of Saint James (17th century).

== Bibliografia ==
- Bernardino Del Coco, Santa Giusta, Roma, Società Grafica Romana, 1955.
- Filippo Murri, Chiesa di Santa Giusta di L'Aquila, L'Aquila, Japadre, 1986.
- Valentina Fraticelli, Maria Cristina Rossi, Santa Giusta di Bazzano, L’Aquila, in Prima e dopo il sisma: vicende conservative dell’arte medievale in Abruzzo, catalogo a cura di Claudia D'Alberto, Teramo, 2011.
