= Preturo =

- Frazione
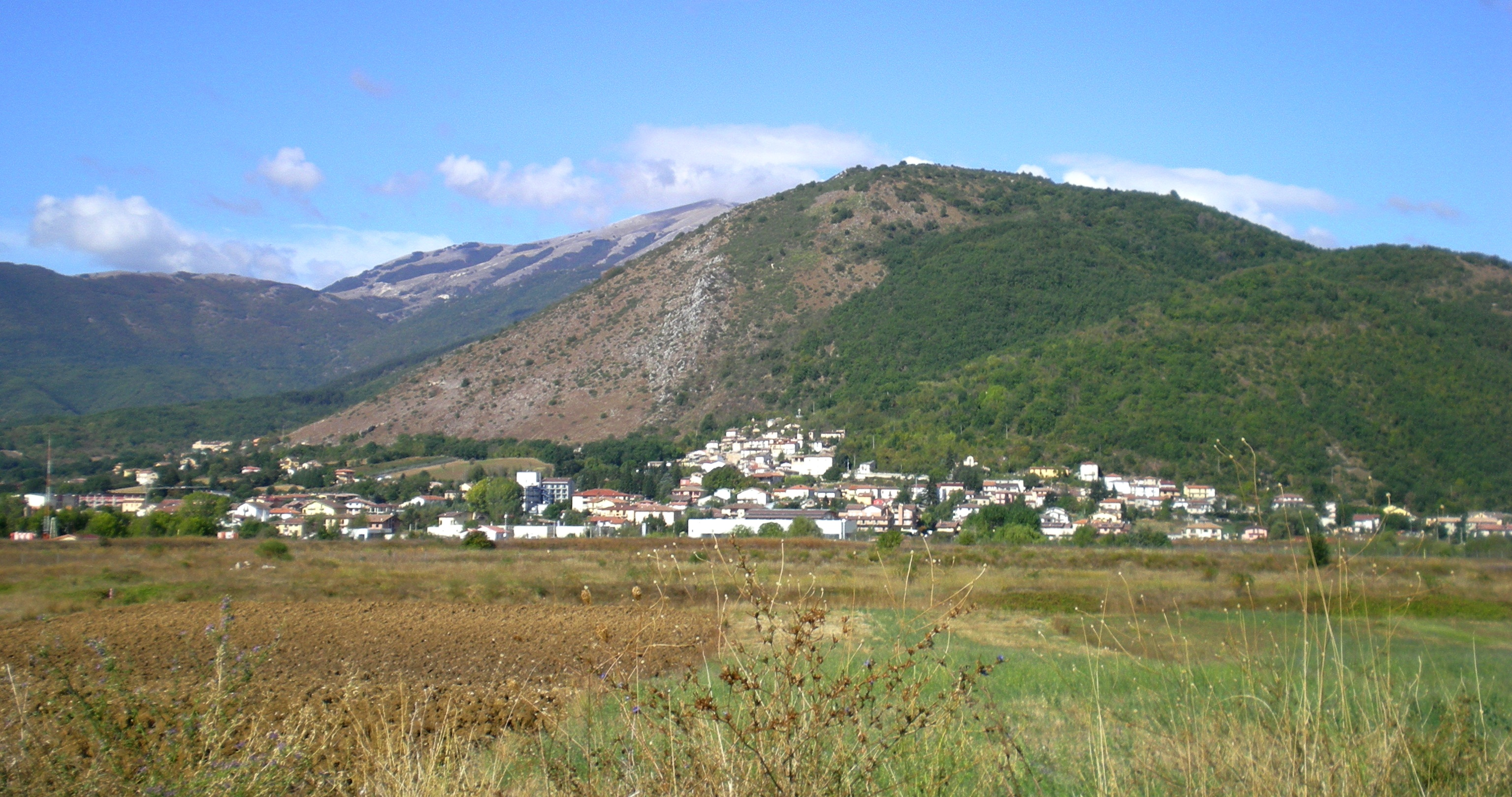
- Interactive map of Preturo
- Coordinates: 42°22′37″N 13°17′46″E
- Country: Italy
- Region: Abruzzo
- Province: L'Aquila (AQ)
- Commune: L'Aquila
- Established: 1927
- Elevation: 685 m (2,247 ft)

Population (2001)
  - Total: 797
- Time zone: UTC+1 (CET)
  - Summer (DST): UTC+2 (CEST)
- Postal code: 67010

Preturo is a frazione in the Province of L'Aquila in the Abruzzo region of central Italy. It was a separate comune until 1927. The L'Aquila-Preturo Airport is located nearby, as well as the remains of the ancient Amiternum.
