= Santa Giusta, Bazzano, L'Aquila =

Church of Santa Giusta in Bazzano
- Chiesa di Santa Giusta a Bazzano
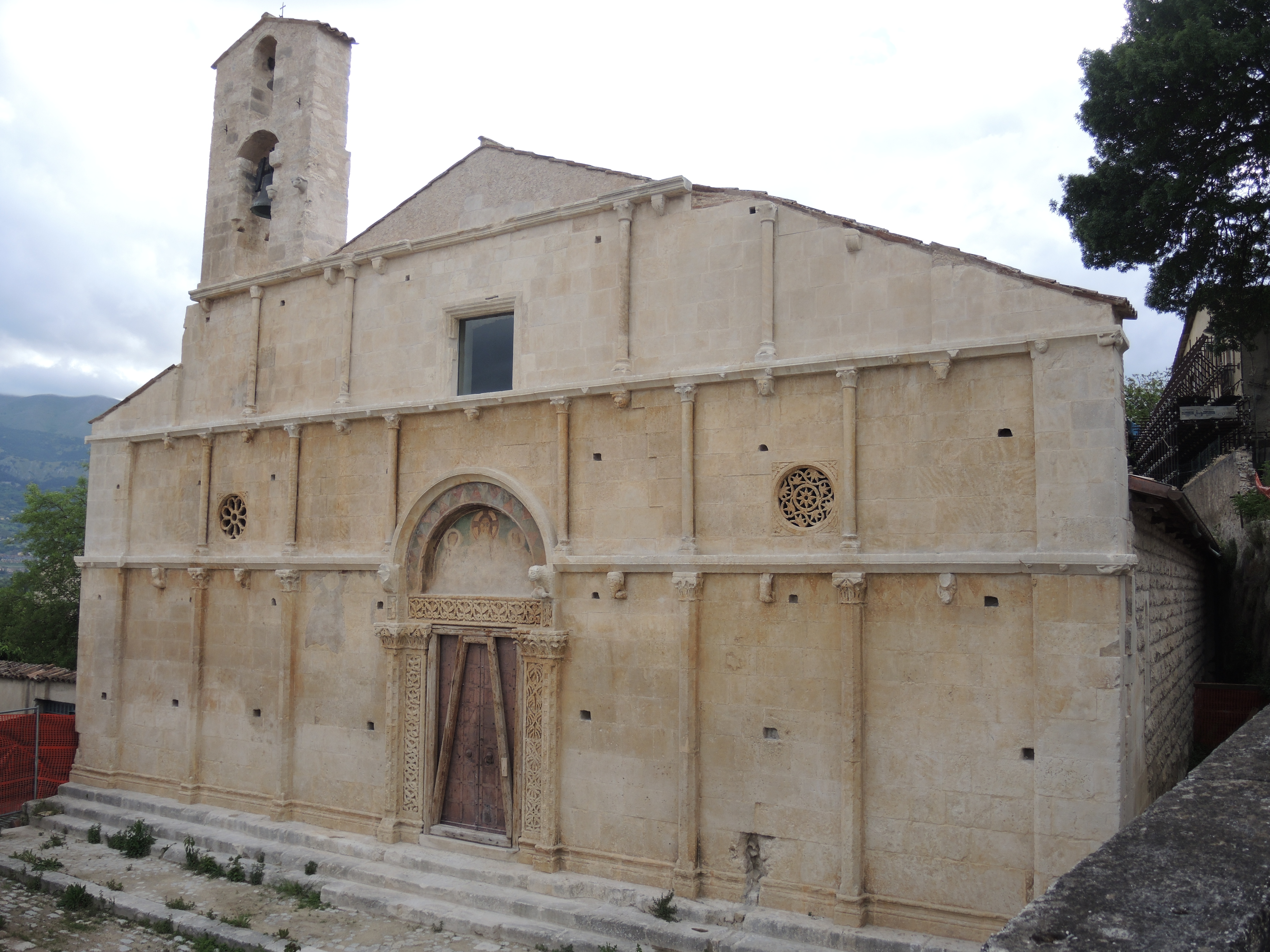
- View of the church

- 42.338078°N 13.453891°E
- Location: Bazzano (L'Aquila)
- Country: Italy
- Denomination: Catholic

History
- Status: Church

Architecture
- Functional status: Active
- Style: Romanesque
- Completed: 9th century

Administration
- Diocese: Archdiocese of L'Aquila

Chiesa di Santa Giusta a Bazzano (Italian for Church of Santa Giusta in Bazzano) is a Romanesque church in Bazzano, frazione of L'Aquila (Abruzzo).

== History ==
The church was built in the 12th century on the site of a pre-existing 9th-century structure; it is one of the most important churches in the L'Aquila area and is characterized by a gable facade in golden stone with decorations in three orders of columns. It stands on the site where legend has it that the young Saint Giusta and all her relatives were martyred; in fact, near the crypt in a picturesque cave, there is still the presence of a Roman oven.

It was erected in 1238 on the ancient gable basilicas of the 3rd century, dedicated one to Santa Giusta di Bazzano and one to her relatives, certainly existing until the 9th century. The aforementioned date, present on the church, is likely the reconstruction after the earthquake of 1214. At the end of the century, the people of Bazzano built another Church of Santa Giusta in their locale, within the walls of L'Aquila.

In 2009, the church was damaged by the 2009 L'Aquila earthquake, with the collapse of the bell gable and the top of the facade, and cracks in the internal parts. After securing the building with shoring, restoration work began in 2011 and is still ongoing. Following a two-year halt, during which only shoring and consolidation work to prevent further collapses were carried out, restoration work resumed in 2014. By 2015, the upper part of the facade and the bell gable had been rebuilt. The final restoration touches delayed the reopening for worship to 2020.

== Architecture ==
The architectural structure is the typical Romanesque basilica with three naves, one of which is interrupted, while the other, smaller in size, is longer than the central one and ends next to the sacristy, which is an extension of the main nave.

Below the rectory and the left nave is the beautiful crypt with a single hall, arranged in the opposite direction to the church, with adjoining rooms carved into the rock where a Roman oven is located; the presence of Roman and Romanesque stone elements and the vaulted ceilings make it an enchanting and mystical place that recalls the early Christians. The facade, dated 1238, is one of the most beautiful elements of the temple; it is a pinnacle of Abruzzese Romanesque architecture divided by horizontal and vertical projections in stone with a central arched portal with columns and surmounting lions and elaborated jambs.
