= L'Aquila Cathedral =

Church in L'Aquila, Italy

Coordinates: 42.3492°N 13.3971°E

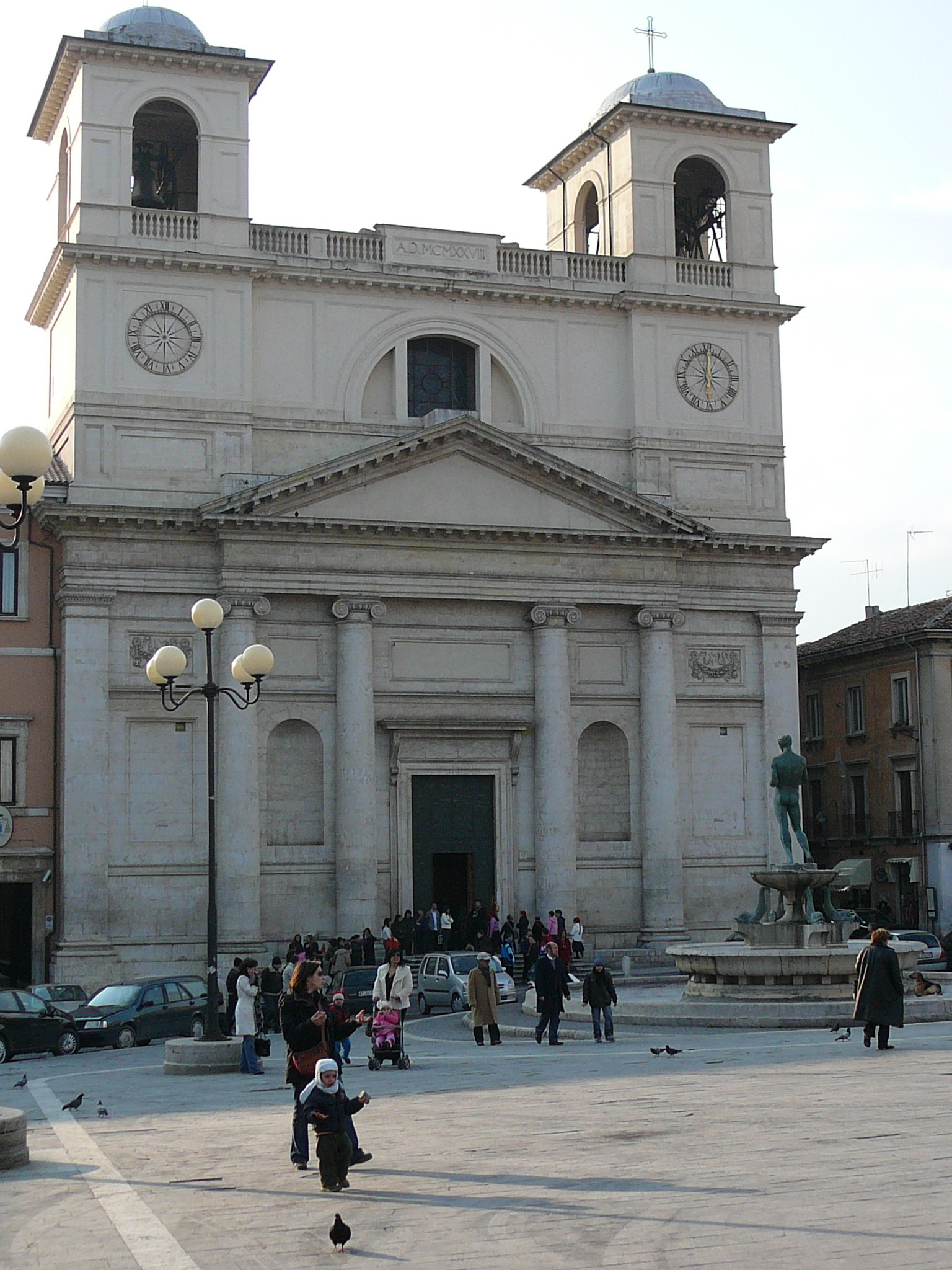
Cathedral before the earthquake of 2009

L'Aquila Cathedral (Italian: Duomo dell'Aquila; Cattedrale metropolitana dei Santi Massimo e Giorgio) is a Roman Catholic cathedral in L'Aquila, Abruzzo, Italy, dedicated to Saint Maximus of Aveia and Saint George. It is the episcopal seat of the Archdiocese of L'Aquila.

== History ==
The cathedral was originally built in the 13th century and destroyed in the earthquake of 1703. It was restored in the 19th century and restored further in the 20th. More recently, it was seriously damaged in the earthquake of 2009, and is presently deemed unfit for use (2023). In the wake of this earthquake, ecclesial functions were temporarily transferred to the Basilica of Santa Maria di Collemaggio, which had also sustained damages.

After August 2013, since the basilica was also closed for worship due to rebuilding works, the ecclesial functions were transferred once again to the Basilica of San Giuseppe Artigiano, not far from the cathedral, which following the same earthquake, had been rebuilt and reopened in July 2012. Reconstruction and restoration works on the cathedral commenced on 28 February 2023, after a lengthy planning process, and are projected to last for 5 years.

== Sources ==
- Abruzzo. Guide Verdi. Touring Club Italiano, 2015. ISBN 9788836565511
