= Santi Marciano e Nicandro, L'Aquila =

Roman Catholic church in L'Aquila, Italy

Coordinates: 42.3488°N 13.3948°E

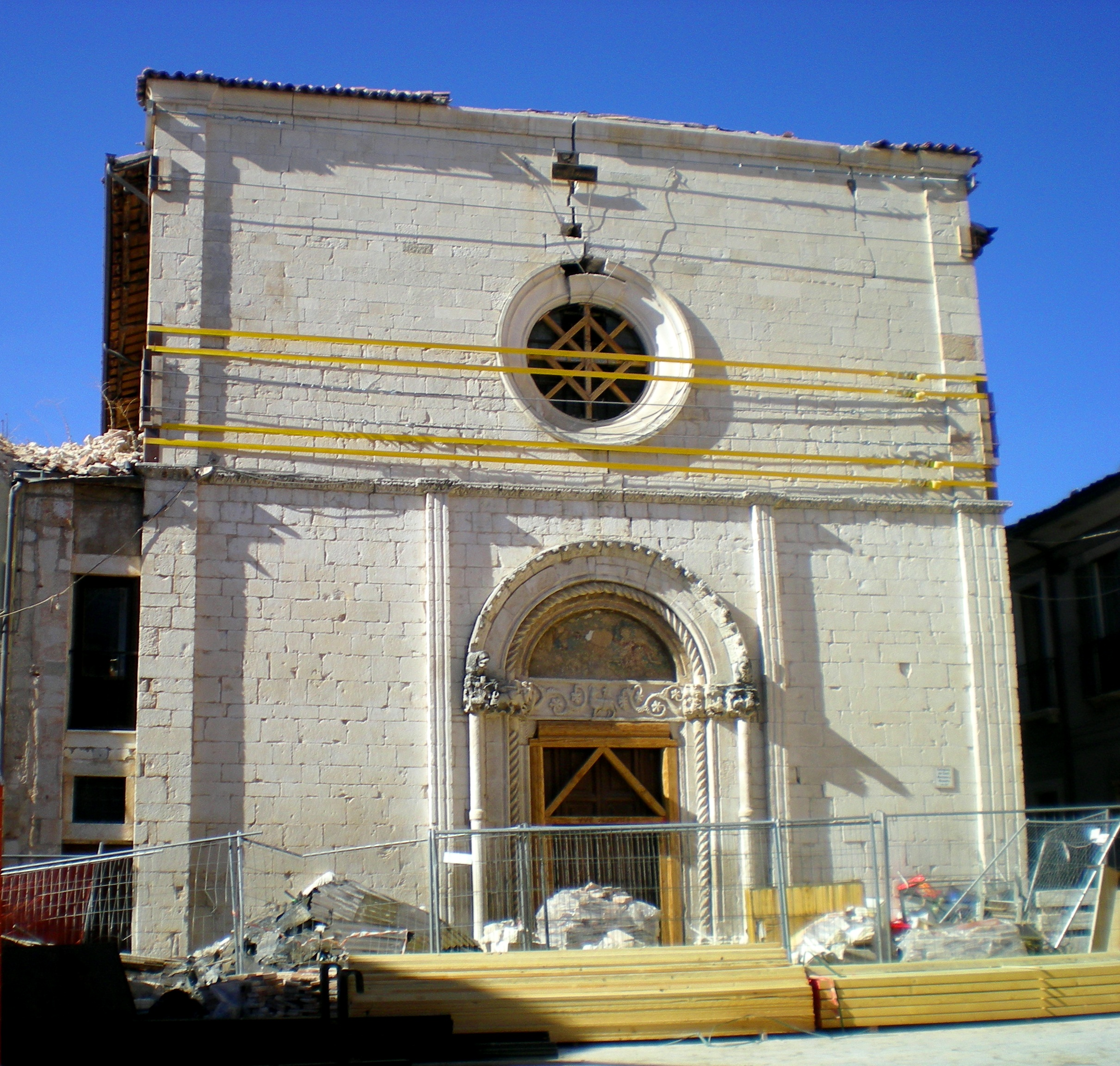
Santi Marciano e Nicandro after the 2009 earthquake

Chiesa dei Santi Marciano e Nicandro is a church in L'Aquila, central Italy.

It was built in Romanesque style in the course of the 13th century, and, after it had been mostly destroyed by an earthquake in 1703, it was renovated in Baroque style. The church was again severely damaged by the earthquake which struck L'Aquila in 2009.

The façade in white stone dates from the 14th century. The portal has capitals with the Four Evangelists (left) and the Adoration of the Magi (right), and is surmounted by a circular window which in 1915 replaced the original rose window. The interior dates mostly from the 18th-century renovation, although the original 13th-century structure has survived in the apse exterior, in the presbytery and the clergy house. It houses 14th- and 15th-century frescoes and statues of St. Peter and St. Marcian.

== Sources ==
- Antonini, Orlando (2010). Architettura religiosa aquilana. Todi: Tau Editrice.
