= Celestinian Forgiveness =

Annual religious event in L'Aquila, Italy

Celestinian Pardon Perdonanza Celestiniana
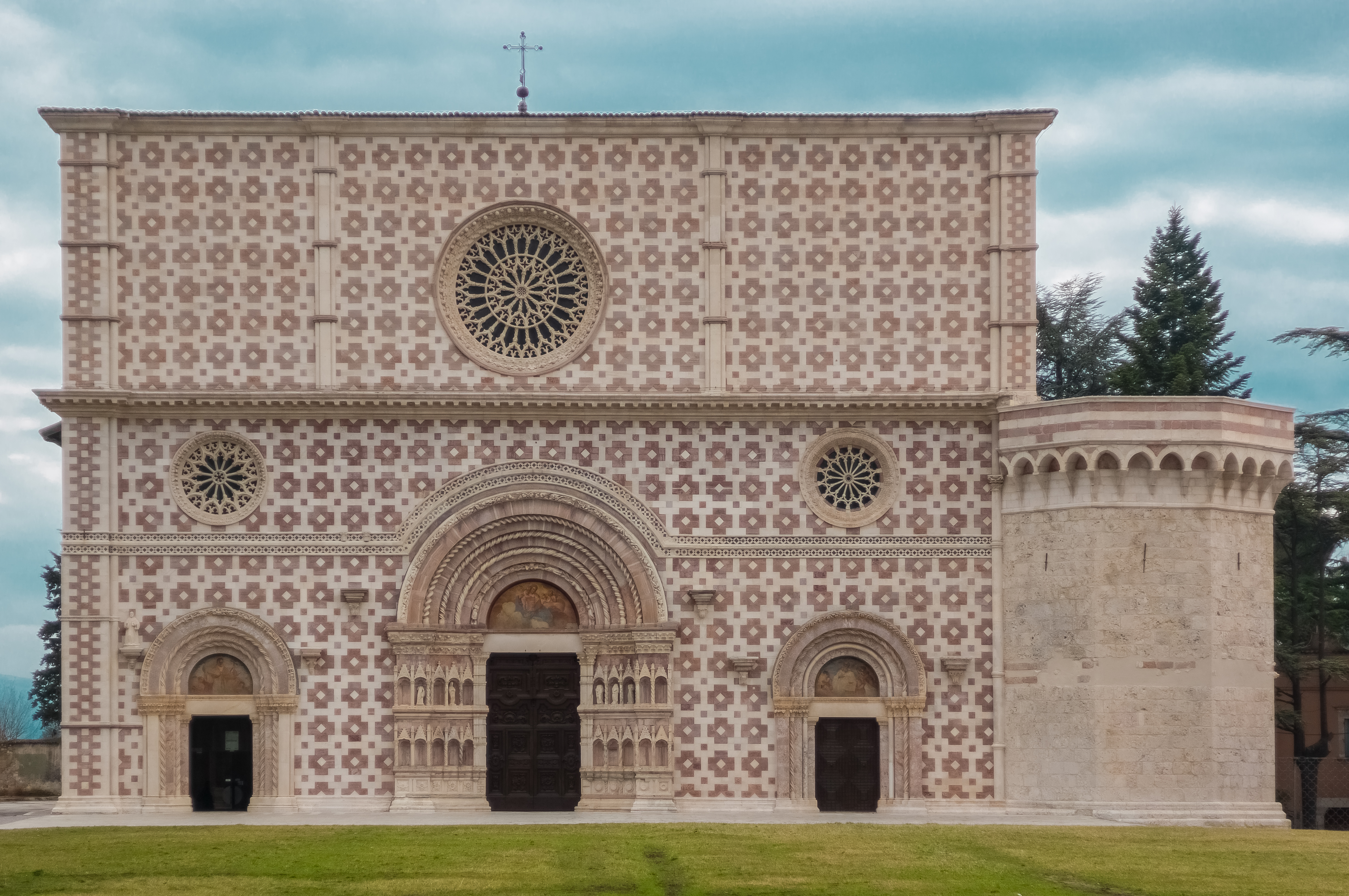
- Santa Maria di Collemaggio, the church where the event takes place.
- Genre: Catholic celebration
- Date: End of August
- Frequency: Annual
- Locations: L'Aquila, Italy
- Inaugurated: 1294

Celestinian Pardon Celebration
- UNESCO Intangible Cultural Heritage
- Country: Italy
- Reference: 01276
- Region: Europe and North America

Inscription history
- Inscription: 2019 (14th session)
- List: Representative

The Celestinian Pardon (in Italian: Perdonanza Celestiniana) is a religious and historical annual event held in L'Aquila, Italy, at the end of August. It is a Catholic jubilee celebration, established in 1294 by Pope Celestine V with his bull Inter sanctorum solemnia (also known as Bull of Pardon or Bull of Forgiveness).

Since 2011 the celebration is a "Heritage of Italy for tradition" ("Patrimonio d'Italia per la tradizione") and in 2019 it was inscribed in the UNESCO Representative List of the Intangible Cultural Heritage of Humanity.
