= Palazzetto dei Nobili =

Building in L'Aquila, Italy

Coordinates: 42.3513°N 13.3974°E

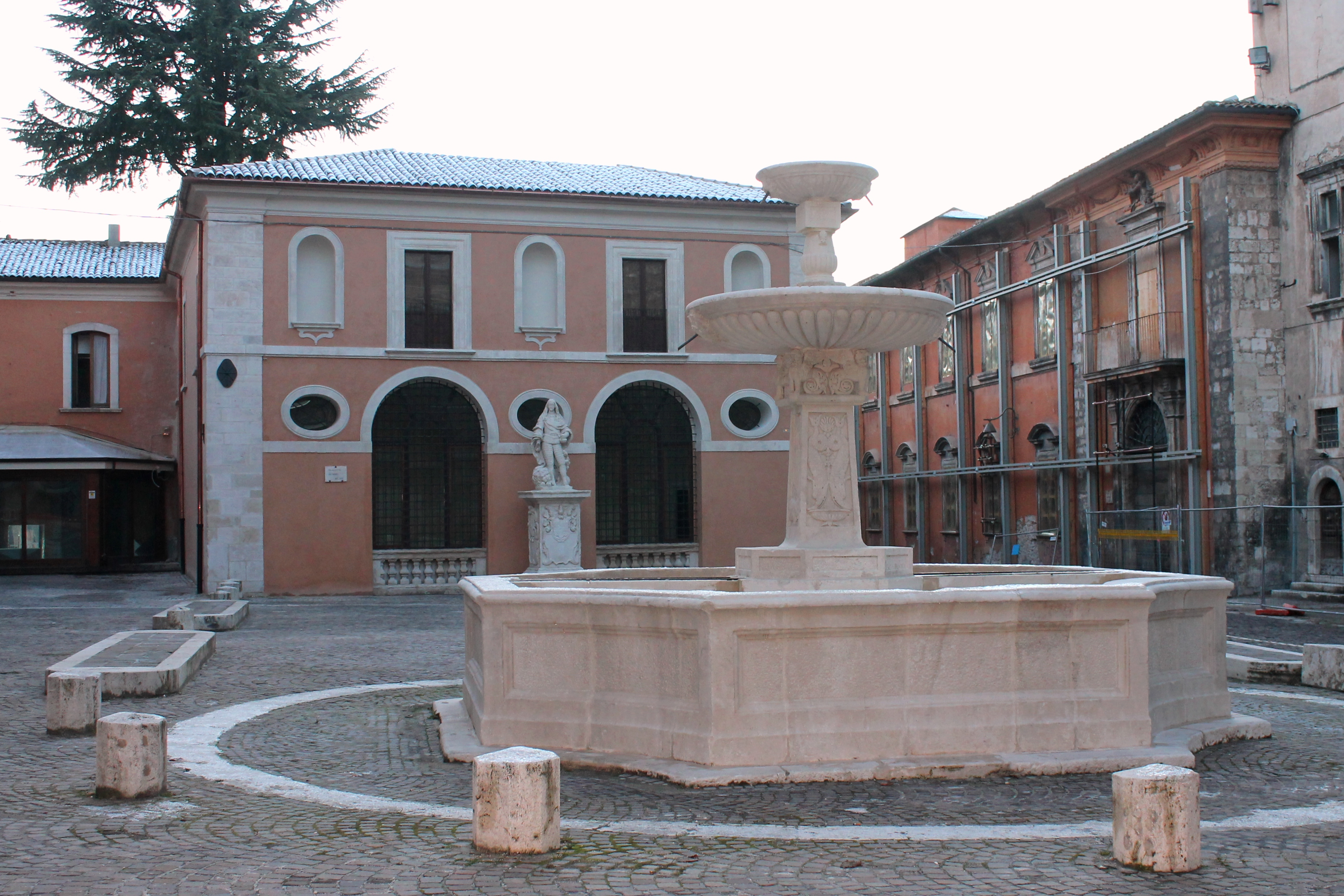
Palazzetto dei Nobili

The Palazzo della Congregazione dei Nobili (Palace of the Congregation of the Nobles), better known as Palazzetto dei Nobili (Palace of Nobles) or “Oratorio dei Nobili” (Oratory of Nobles), is a historic building of L'Aquila in Southern Italy.

The Palace is located in L’Aquila center at piazza Santa Margherita, 2.

== History ==
The Palace of Nobles of l’Aquila is a typical Palace of the Italian Mannerist architecture.

After the 2009 L’Aquila's earthquake, the Palace was renovated and opened in September 2012.

Today the Palace the headquarters of the Committee for the nomination of the European Capital of Culture cities and art exhibitions.

== Bibliography ==
- Orlando Antonini, Architettura religiosa aquilana, Todi (Pg), Tau Editrice, 2010;
- Alessandro Clementi, Elio Piroddi, L'Aquila, Bari, Laterza, 1986;
- Touring Club Italiano, L'Italia - Abruzzo e Molise, Milano, Touring Editore, 2005.
