= Nicola Di Francia =

Italian football defender

Personal information
- Full name: Nicola Di Francia
- Date of birth: September 24, 1985 (age 41)
- Place of birth: L'Aquila, Italy
- Height: 1.84 m (6 ft 0 in)
- Position: Defender

Senior career*
Years	Team	Apps	(Gls)
2002–2003	L'Aquila	0	(0)
2003–2004	Astrea	25	(0)
2004–2007	Rieti	40	(0)
2007–2008	Lupa Frascati	12	(0)
2007	→ Nocera Umbra (loan)	0	(0)
2008–2012	L'Aquila	50	(1)
2008	→ Morro d'Oro (loan)	17	(0)
- * Club domestic league appearances and goals as of 20 May 2012

Nicola Di Francia (born 24 September 1985 in L'Aquila) is an Italian football defender who most recently played for L'Aquila. He previously played in Serie C2 for Rieti.
