= Monticchio, L'Aquila =

Coordinates: 42°19′15″N 13°27′53″E

Monticchio
- Frazione
- Interactive map of Monticchio
- Country: Italy
- Region: Abruzzo
- Province: L'Aquila
- Commune: L'Aquila
- Time zone: UTC+1 (CET)
  - Summer (DST): UTC+2 (CEST)

Monticchio is a frazione of L'Aquila in the Abruzzo, region of Italy.

The patron saint of Monticchio is Blessed Timoteo.
