= Nestore Leoni =

Italian painter (1862–1947)

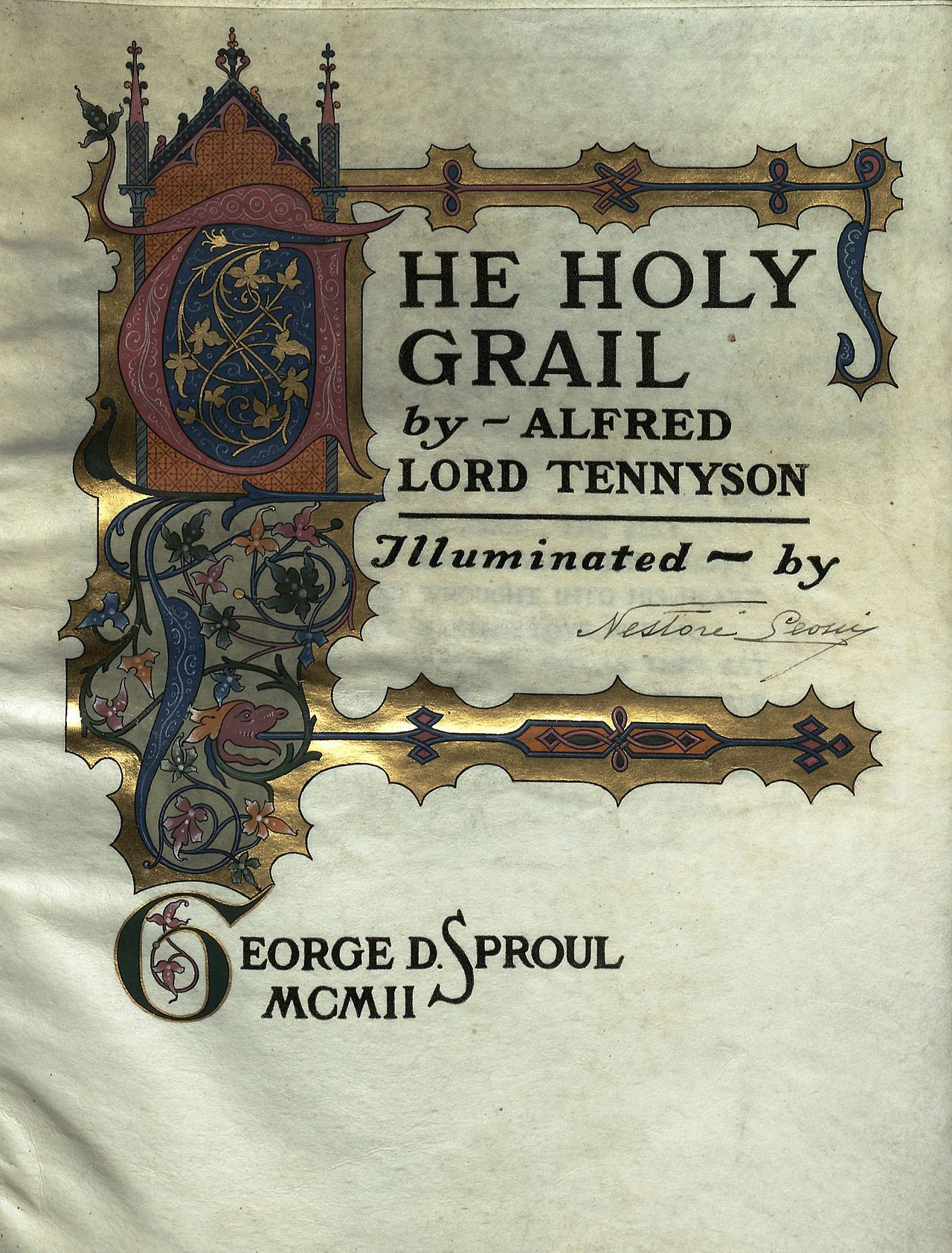
Illumination by Leoni for a 1902 edition of a book by Alfred, Lord Tennyson

Nestore Leoni (14 February 1862 in L'Aquila, Abruzzo – 1947) was an Italian painter and illuminator of manuscripts (miniatore).

He was a resident of Florence. Initially, he studied in L'Aquila, but later dedicated himself to the study of classic manuscript illumination, particularly in the Florentine Libraries, striving to imitate antique styles. Among his earliest works was the cover of an album commemorating the visit of Emperor William II of Germany to Rome, which received praised from Niccolo Barabino, a professor in Florence. Leoni was also commissioned to create designs for porcelain and documents commemorating special occasions, such as a document from the Società Filarmonica Fiorentina to Madame Hastreiter, after a charity concert.

Cavaliere Civelli commissioned him to design covers for his edition of La Vita Nuova by Dante, which he decorated on parchment, in a style from the 1500s, reproduced using chromolithography. He also completed in similar style the Canzone di Cino da Pistoia to Dante, on Death of Beatrice, offered to the queen of Italy in occasion of the centenary of Beatrice Portinari.
