= L'Aquila =

- Comune
- Comune dell'Aquila
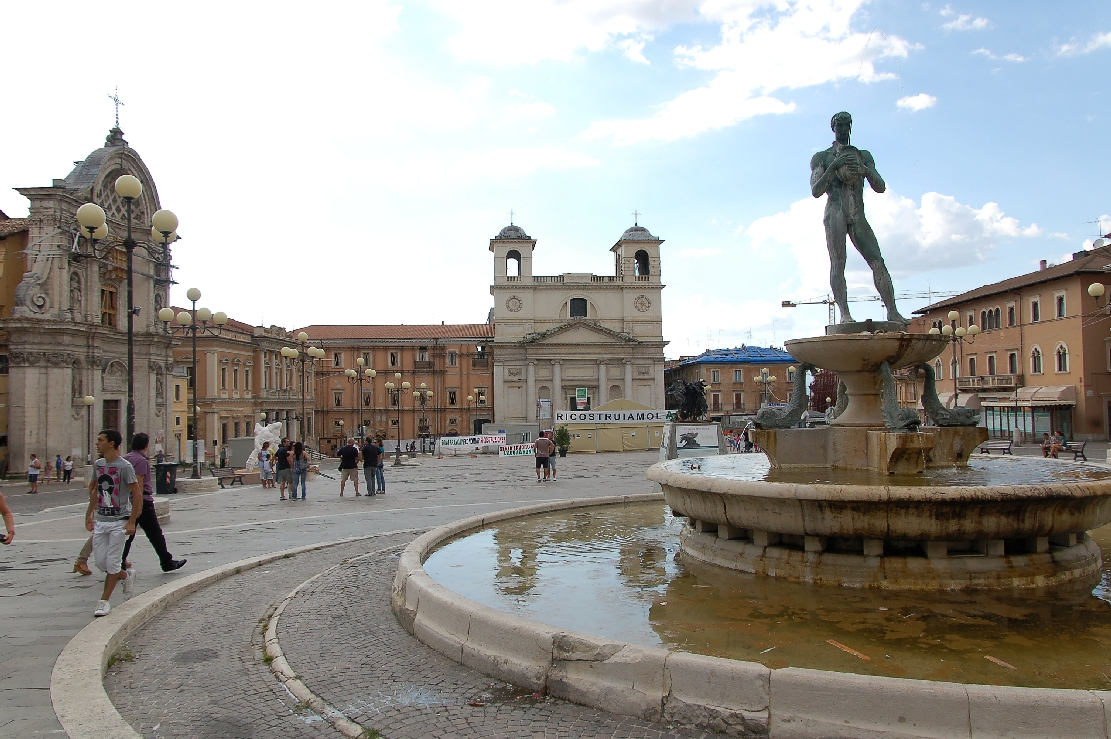
- Piazza del Duomo with the L'Aquila Cathedral in the background

- Flag Coat of arms

- Location within Italy Location within Abruzzo Location within Europe
- Coordinates: 42°21′N 13°24′E
- Country: Italy
- Region: Abruzzo
- Province: L'Aquila
- Frazioni: see list

Government
  - Mayor: Pierluigi Biondi (FdI)

Area
  - Total: 473.91 km^{2} (182.98 sq mi)
- Elevation: 714 m (2,343 ft)

Population (2025)
  - Total: 70,421
  - Density: 148.60/km^{2} (384.86/sq mi)
- Demonym: Aquilani
- Time zone: UTC+1 (CET)
  - Summer (DST): UTC+2 (CEST)
- Postal code: 67100
- Dialing code: 0862
- Patron saint: St. Maximus, St. Equitius, St. Peter Celestine, St. Bernardino of Siena
- Saint day: June 10
- Website: Official website

L'Aquila (/ˈlækwɪlə/ LAK-wil-ə; Italian: [ˈlaːkwila]; Neapolitan: [ˈlaːkwiːlə]) is the capital city of the region of Abruzzo in central Italy. With 70,421 inhabitants as of 2025, it is also the second-largest city in the region. Laid out within medieval walls on a hill in the wide valley of the Aterno river, it is surrounded by the Apennine Mountains, with the Gran Sasso d'Italia to the north-east.

L'Aquila sits on a hillside in the middle of a narrow valley; the snow-capped mountains of the Gran Sasso massif flank the town. A maze of narrow streets, lined with Baroque and Renaissance buildings and churches, open onto elegant piazzas. Home to the University of L'Aquila, it is a lively college town and, as such, has many cultural institutions: a repertory theatre, a symphony orchestra, a fine art academy, a state conservatory and a film institute. There are several ski resorts in the surrounding province (Campo Imperatore, Ovindoli, Pescasseroli, Roccaraso, Scanno).

== History ==
=== Middle Ages ===
The city's construction was begun by Frederick II, Holy Roman Emperor and King of Sicily, out of several already existing villages (ninety-nine, according to local tradition; see Amiternum), as a bulwark against the power of the papacy. The name of Aquila means "Eagle" in Italian. Construction was completed in 1254 under Frederick's son, Conrad IV of Germany. The name was switched to Aquila degli Abruzzi in 1861, and L'Aquila in 1939. After the death of Conrad, the city was destroyed by his brother Manfred in 1259, but soon rebuilt by Charles I of Anjou, his successor as king of Sicily. The walls were completed in 1316.

It quickly became the second city of the Kingdom of Naples. It was an autonomous city, ruled by a diarchy composed of the City Council (which had varying names and composition over the centuries) and the King's Captain. It fell initially under the lordship of Niccolò dell'Isola, appointed by the people as the People's Knight, but he was then killed when he became a tyrant. Later, it fell under Pietro "Lalle" Camponeschi, Count of Montorio, who became the third side of a new triarchy, with the Council and the King's Captain. Camponeschi, who was also Great Chancellor of the kingdom of Naples, became too powerful, and was killed by order of Prince Louis of Taranto. His descendants fought with the Pretatti family for power for several generations, but never again attained the power of their ancestor. The last, and the one true "lord" of L'Aquila, was Ludovico Franchi, who challenged the power of the pope by giving refuge to Alfonso I d'Este, former duke of Ferrara, and the children of Giampaolo Baglioni, deposed lord of Perugia. In the end, however, the Aquilans had him deposed and imprisoned by the king of Naples.

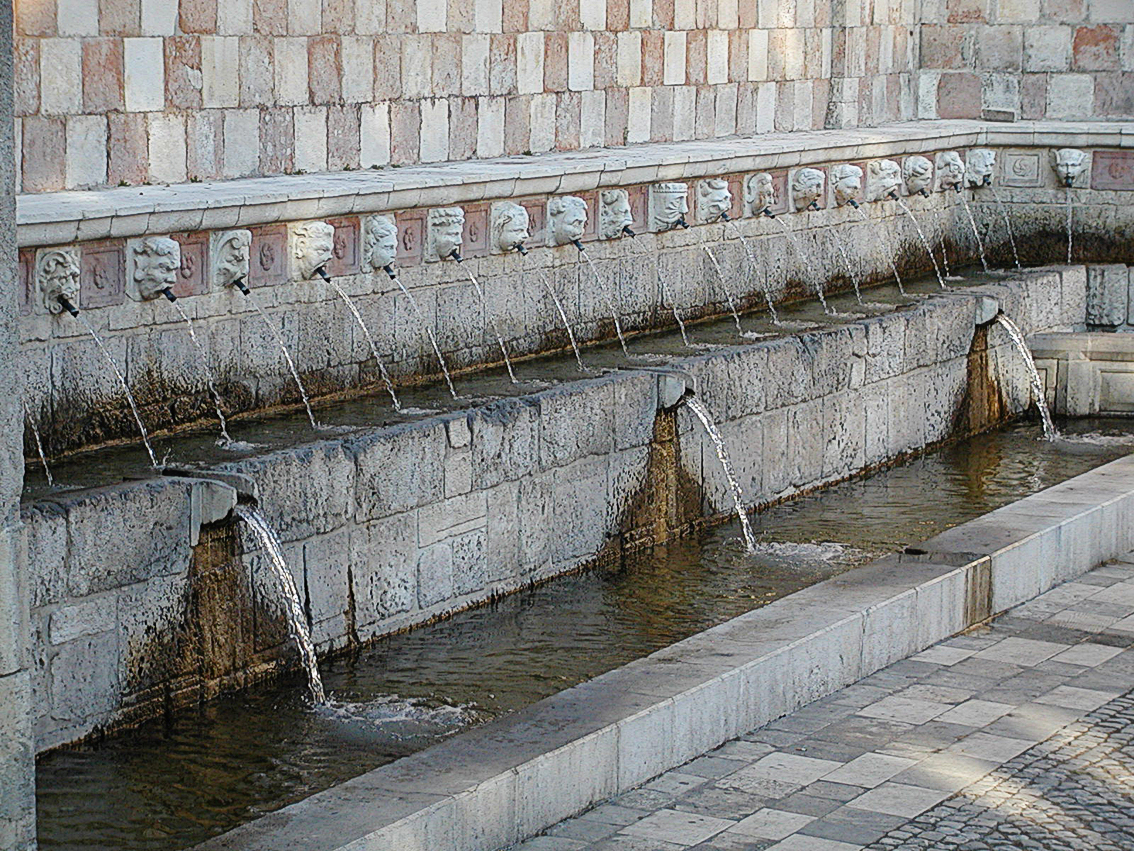
Fountain of the 99 Spouts.

The power of L'Aquila was based on the close connection between the city and its mother-villages, which had established the city as a federation, each of them building a borough and considering it as a part of the mother-village. The Fountain of the 99 Spouts (Fontana delle 99 Cannelle), was given its name to celebrate the ancient origin of the town. The City Council was originally composed of the Mayors of the villages, and the city had no legal existence until King Charles II of Naples appointed a "Camerlengo", responsible for city tributes (previously paid separately by each of its mother-villages). Later, the Camerlengo also took political power, as President of the City Council.

From its beginnings the city constituted an important market for the surrounding countryside, which provided it with a regular supply of food: from the fertile valleys came the precious saffron; the surrounding mountain pastures provided summer grazing for numerous transhumant flocks of sheep, which in turn supplied abundant raw materials for export and, to a lesser extent, small local industries, which in time brought craftsmen and merchants from outside the area.

Within a few decades L'Aquila became a crossroads in communications between cities within and beyond the Kingdom, thanks to the so-called "via degli Abruzzi", which ran from Florence to Naples by way of Perugia, Rieti, L'Aquila, Sulmona, Isernia, Venafro, Teano and Capua.

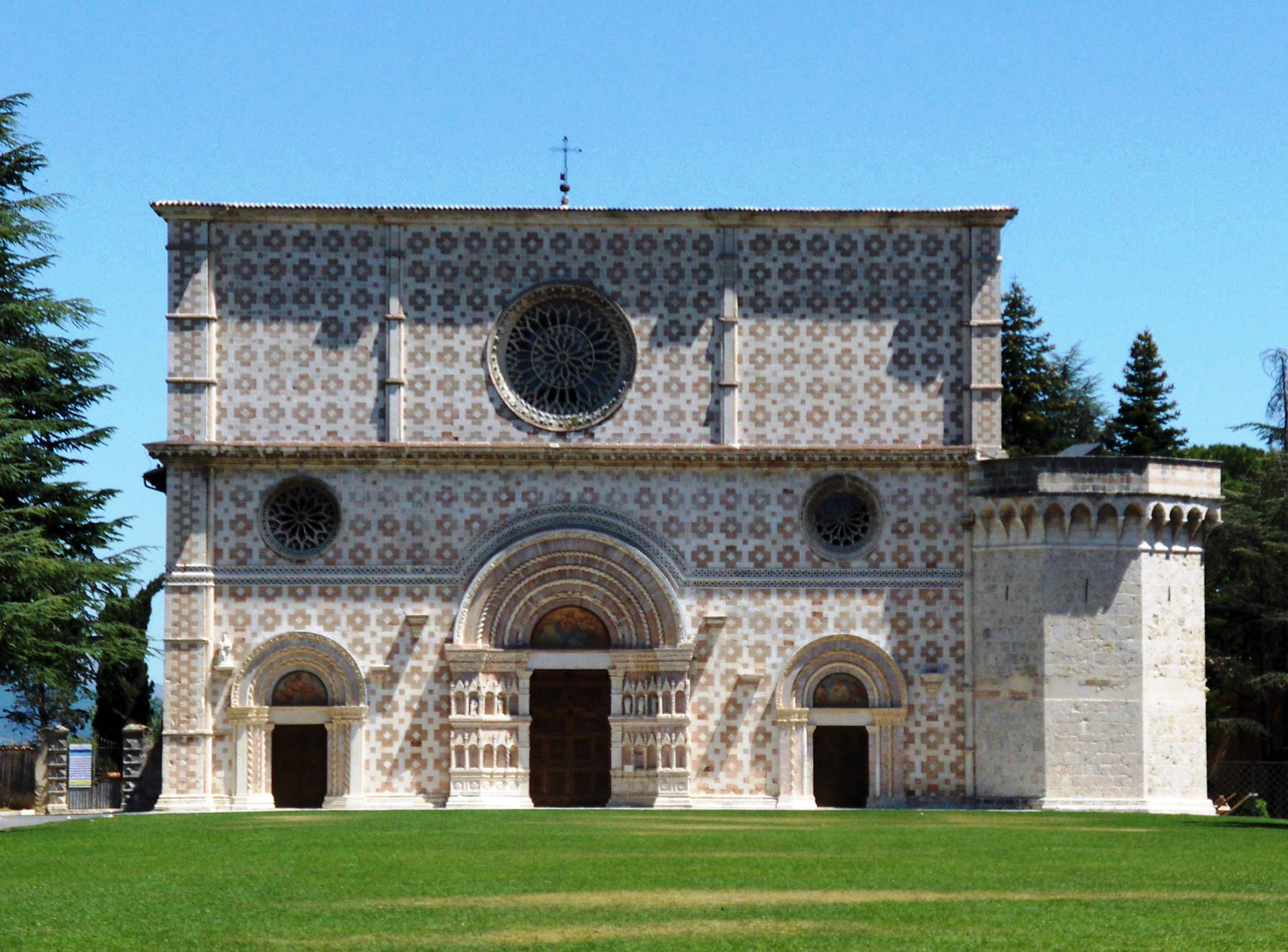
Church of Santa Maria di Collemaggio.

Negotiations for the succession of Edmund, son of Henry III of England, to the throne of the Kingdom of Sicily involved L'Aquila in the web of interests linking the Roman Curia to the English court. On 23 December 1256 Pope Alexander IV elevated the churches of Saints Massimo and Giorgio to the status of cathedrals as a reward to the citizens of L'Aquila for their opposition to King Manfred who, in July 1259, had the city razed to the ground in an attempt to destroy the negotiations. On 29 August 1294 the hermit Pietro del Morrone was consecrated as pope Celestine V in the church of Santa Maria di Collemaggio, in commemoration of which the new pope decreed the annual religious rite of the Pardon (nowadays known as Celestinian Forgiveness, Perdonanza Celestiniana), still observed today in the city on 28 and 29 August: it is the immediate ancestor of the Jubilee Year.

The pontificate of Celestine V gave a new impulse to building development, as can be seen from the city statutes. In 1311, moreover, King Robert of Anjou granted privileges which had a decisive influence on the development of trade. These privileges protected all activities related to sheep-farming, exempting them from customs duties on imports and exports. This was the period in which merchants from Tuscany (Scale, Bonaccorsi) and Rieti purchased houses in the city. Hence the conditions for radical political renewal: in 1355 the trade guilds of leather-workers, metal-workers, merchants and learned men were brought into the government of the city, and these together with the Camerario and the Cinque constituted the new Camera Aquilana. Eleven years earlier, in 1344, the King had granted the city its own mint.

In the middle of the 14th century the city was struck by plague epidemics (1348, 1363) and earthquakes (1349). Reconstruction began soon, however. In the 14th–15th century Jewish families came to live in the city, while the generals of the Franciscan Order chose the city as the seat of the Order's general chapters (1376, 1408, 1411, 1450, 1452, 1495). Bernardino of Siena, of the Franciscan order of the Observance, visited L'Aquila twice, the first time to preach in the presence of King René of Naples, and in 1444, on his second visit, he died in the city. In 1481 Adam of Rottweil, a pupil and collaborator of Johann Gutenberg, obtained permission to establish a printing press in L'Aquila.

The Osservanti branch of the Franciscan order had a decisive influence on L'Aquila. As a result of initiatives by Friar Giovanni da Capistrano and Friar Giacomo della Marca, Lombard masters undertook, in the relatively underdeveloped north-east of the city, an imposing series of buildings centring on the hospital of Saint Salvatore (1446) and the convent and the Basilica of San Bernardino. The construction work was long and difficult, mainly because of the earthquake of 1461, which caused the buildings to collapse, and the translation of the body of San Bernardino did not take place until 14 May 1472. The whole city suffered serious damage on the occasion of the earthquake, and two years went by before repairs on the churches and convents began.

In a strategy finalised to increasing their political and economic autonomy, the Aquilani took a series of political gambles, siding sometimes with the Roman Papacy, sometimes with the Kingdom of Naples. When the Pope excommunicated Joanna II, Queen of Naples, appointing Louis III of Anjou as heir to the crown in her stead, L'Aquila sided with the Angevines. Joanna hired the condottiero Braccio da Montone. In exchange for his services, Braccio obtained the lordship of Teramo, as well as the fiefdoms of Capua and Foggia: he started a 13-month-long siege of L'Aquila, that resisted bravely. Facing Braccio, at the head of the Angevin army was Muzio Attendolo Sforza and his son Francesco. The final clash between the two contenders was just below the walls of Aquila, near the hamlet today called Bazzano. In the battle fought on 2 June 1424, Braccio, mortally wounded in the neck, was made prisoner and transported to Aquila, where he died three days later, on 5 June 1424. The Pope had him buried in deconsecrated earth. The citizens of L'Aquila honoured the bravery of their enemy Braccio by dedicating one of the main streets of the city to his name.

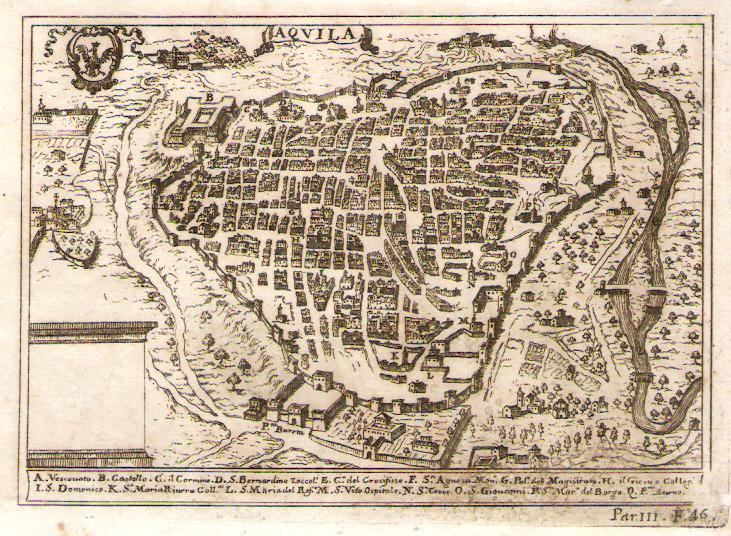
L'Aquila in 1703.

=== Modern era ===
This period of freedom and prosperity ended in the 16th century, when Spanish viceroy Philibert van Oranje partially destroyed L'Aquila and established Spanish feudalism in its countryside. The city, separated from its roots, never developed again. Ancient privileges were revoked. L'Aquila was again destroyed by an earthquake in 1703. Successive earthquakes have repeatedly damaged the city's large cathedral, and destroyed the original dome of the Basilica of San Bernardino, designed along the lines of the dome of Santa Maria del Fiore in Florence. The city was also sacked two times by French troops in 1799.

L'Aquila, like so much of Italy, is a city of political contrasts. In the 1970s a novel by Alberto Moravia was seized because it was considered obscene, a local Catholic Archbishop protested the nudity of a centuries-old statue of a young man, and a group of local reactionaries even asked for the seizure of the £50 coin because it showed a naked man. In October 2003, however, a liberal judge in l'Aquila ordered the small town of Ofena to remove a crucifix from its elementary school so as not to offend the religious sensibilities of two young Muslim students. After a national outcry, the judge's decision was overturned. In May 2007 Massimo Cialente, a physician and medical researcher, was elected mayor of L'Aquila with a centre-left coalition.

=== Earthquakes ===
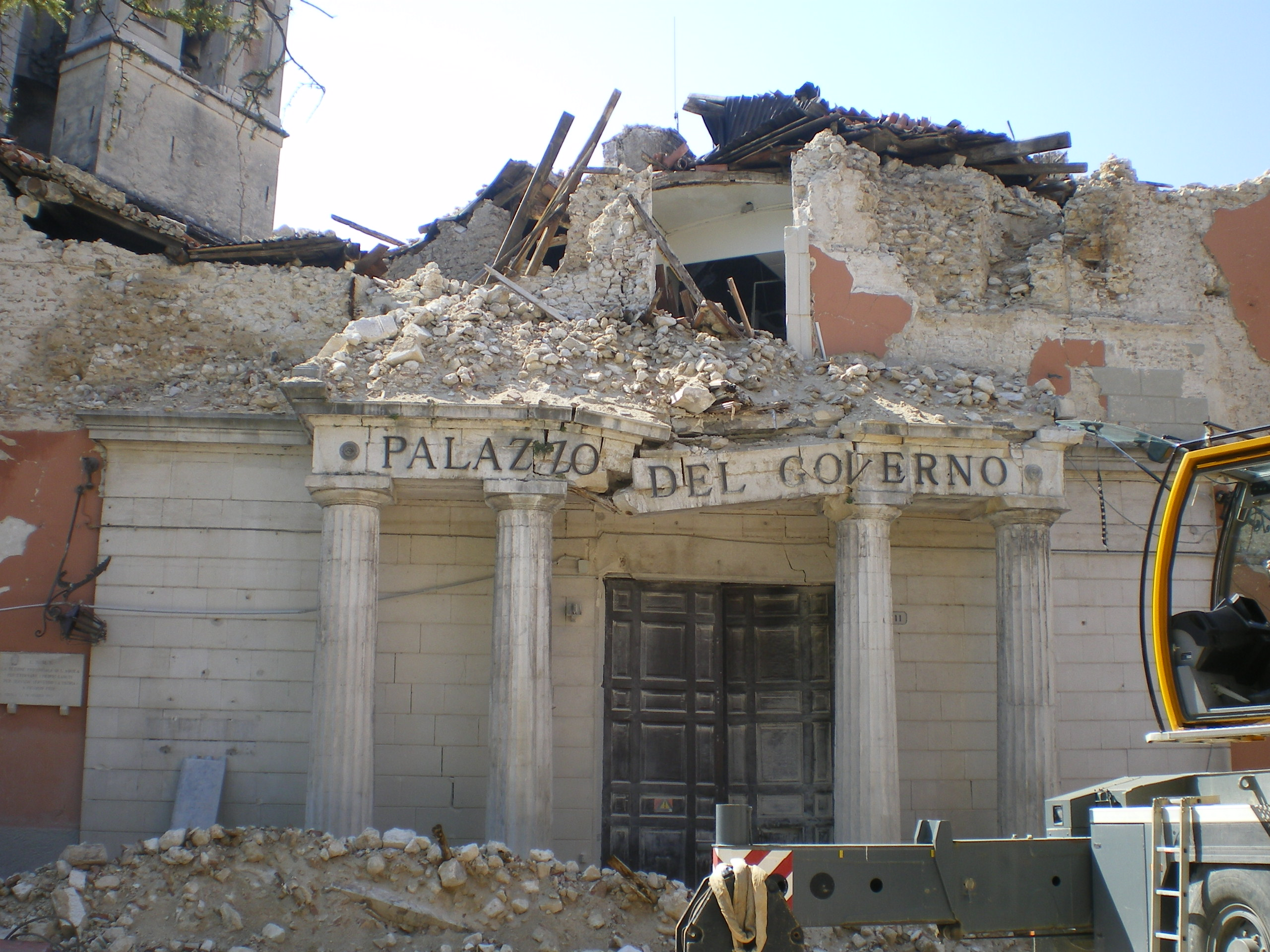
The local prefecture (a government office) damaged by the earthquake.

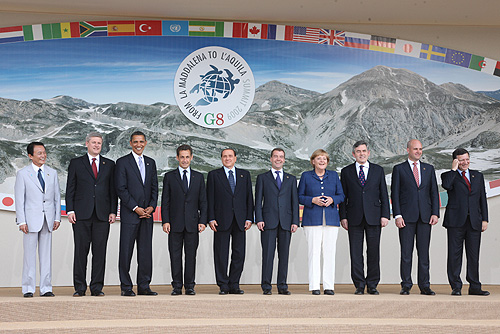
Leaders pose for a group photo on the first day of the G8 Summit.

Earthquakes mark the history of L'Aquila, as the city is partly built on an ancient lake-bed which amplifies seismic activity.

On 3 December 1315 the city was struck by an earthquake which seriously damaged the San Francesco Church. Another earthquake struck on 9 September 1349, killing about 800 people. Other earthquakes struck in 1452, then on 26 November 1461, and again in 1501 and 1646. On 3 February 1703 a major earthquake struck the town. More than 3,000 people died and almost all the churches collapsed; Rocca Calascio, the highest fortress in Europe was also ruined by this event, yet the town survived. L'Aquila was then repopulated by decision of Pope Clement XI. The town was rocked by earthquake again in 1706. On 26 June 1958 an earthquake of 5.0 magnitude struck the town.

On 6 April 2009, at 01:32 GMT (03:32 CEST) an earthquake of 6.3 magnitude struck central Italy with its epicentre near L'Aquila, at 42.4228°N 13.3945°E. Initial reports said the earthquake caused damage to between 3,000 and 10,000 buildings in L'Aquila. Several buildings also collapsed. 308 people were killed by the earthquake, and approximately 1,500 people were injured. Twenty of the victims were children. Around 65,000 people were made homeless. There were many students trapped in a partially collapsed dormitory. The 6 April earthquake was felt throughout Abruzzo; as far away as Rome, other parts of Lazio, Marche, Molise, Umbria, and Campania.

=== G8 summit ===
Because of the 2009 earthquake, the Berlusconi government decided to move that year's G8 summit from its scheduled Sardinian host of La Maddalena to L'Aquila, so that disaster funds would be distributed to the affected region and to show solidarity with the city's inhabitants. World leaders converged on L'Aquila on 8 July and many of them were given tours of the devastated city by the host Prime Minister.

== Geography ==
Close to the highest of the Apennine summits, L'Aquila, with an elevation of 721 metres (2,365 ft), is situated in the valley of the Aterno-Pescara, between four mountain peaks above 2,000 metres (6,600 ft).

The mountains block the city off from the warm humid air currents of the Mediterranean, giving rise to a climate that is dry and cooler than most of central Italy. It's a common saying among locals that the city enjoys 11 cold months a year and one cool one ("Undici misi de friddu e unu de friscu").

L'Aquila is approximately 100 kilometres (62 mi) east-northeast of Rome, with which it is connected by an autostrada through the mountains.

=== Climate ===
L'Aquila has a borderline warm-summer Mediterranean climate (Köppen Csb), hot-summer Mediterranean climate (Köppen Csa), humid subtropical climate (Köppen Cfa) and oceanic climate (Köppen Cfb), influenced by its high altitude in the Apennine Mountains.

Climate data for L'Aquila 42°22′N 13°21′E
Month	Jan	Feb	Mar	Apr	May	Jun	Jul	Aug	Sep	Oct	Nov	Dec	Year
Mean daily maximum °C (°F)	6.4 (43.5)	8.5 (47.3)	12.3 (54.1)	16.3 (61.3)	20.9 (69.6)	25.3 (77.5)	29.0 (84.2)	29.1 (84.4)	24.7 (76.5)	18.4 (65.1)	12.2 (54.0)	7.4 (45.3)	17.5 (63.6)
Daily mean °C (°F)	2.3 (36.1)	3.8 (38.8)	7.0 (44.6)	10.7 (51.3)	14.9 (58.8)	18.7 (65.7)	21.6 (70.9)	21.6 (70.9)	18.1 (64.6)	12.8 (55.0)	7.8 (46.0)	3.7 (38.7)	11.9 (53.5)
Mean daily minimum °C (°F)	−1.8 (28.8)	−1.0 (30.2)	1.7 (35.1)	5.0 (41.0)	8.8 (47.8)	12.2 (54.0)	14.2 (57.6)	14.1 (57.4)	11.4 (52.5)	7.2 (45.0)	3.3 (37.9)	−0.1 (31.8)	6.3 (43.3)
Average rainfall mm (inches)	66.1 (2.60)	64.5 (2.54)	51.2 (2.02)	56.6 (2.23)	51.0 (2.01)	46.1 (1.81)	34.7 (1.37)	37.7 (1.48)	52.8 (2.08)	66.3 (2.61)	91.3 (3.59)	83.7 (3.30)	702 (27.64)
Average snowfall cm (inches)	27.0 (10.6)	19.8 (7.8)	7.2 (2.8)	0 (0)	0 (0)	0 (0)	0 (0)	0 (0)	0 (0)	0 (0)	0 (0)	13.8 (5.4)	67.8 (26.6)
Average rainy days	8	8	8	9	8	6	5	5	6	8	10	10	91
Average snowy days	3	2.2	1	0	0	0	0	0	0	0	0	1.6	7.8

== Subdivisions ==
The following is a list of the frazioni in the comune of L'Aquila: Aquilio, Aragno, Arischia, Assergi, Bagno, Bazzano, Camarda, Cansatessa, Casaline, Cermone, Cese di Preturo, Civita di Bagno, Colle di Preturo, Colle di Sassa, Colle Roio – Poggio di Roio, Collebrincioni, Collefracido di Sassa, Collemare di Sassa, Coppito, Filetto, Foce di Sassa, Forcelle, Genzano di Sassa, Gignano, Monticchio, Onna, Paganica, Pagliare di Sassa, Pescomaggiore, Pettino, Pianola, Pile, Pizzutillo, Poggio di Roio, Poggio Santa Maria, Pozza di Preturo, Pratelle, Preturo, Ripa, Roio Piano, San Giacomo Alto, San Giuliano, San Gregorio, San Leonardo, San Marco Di Preturo, San Martino di Sassa, Santa Rufina di Roio, Sant'Angelo, Sant'Elia, Santi, San Vittorino, Sassa, Tempera, Torretta, Vallesindola, Vasche.

== Demographics ==
Historical population

Year	Pop.	±%
1861	33,569	—
1871	35,172	+4.8%
1881	39,072	+11.1%
1901	43,829	+12.2%
1911	45,125	+3.0%
1921	48,204	+6.8%
1931	51,174	+6.2%
1936	51,160	−0.0%

Year	Pop.	±%
1951	54,633	+6.8%
1961	56,019	+2.5%
1971	60,131	+7.3%
1981	63,678	+5.9%
1991	66,813	+4.9%
2001	68,503	+2.5%
2011	66,964	−2.2%
2021	69,210	+3.4%

Source: ISTAT

== Main sites ==
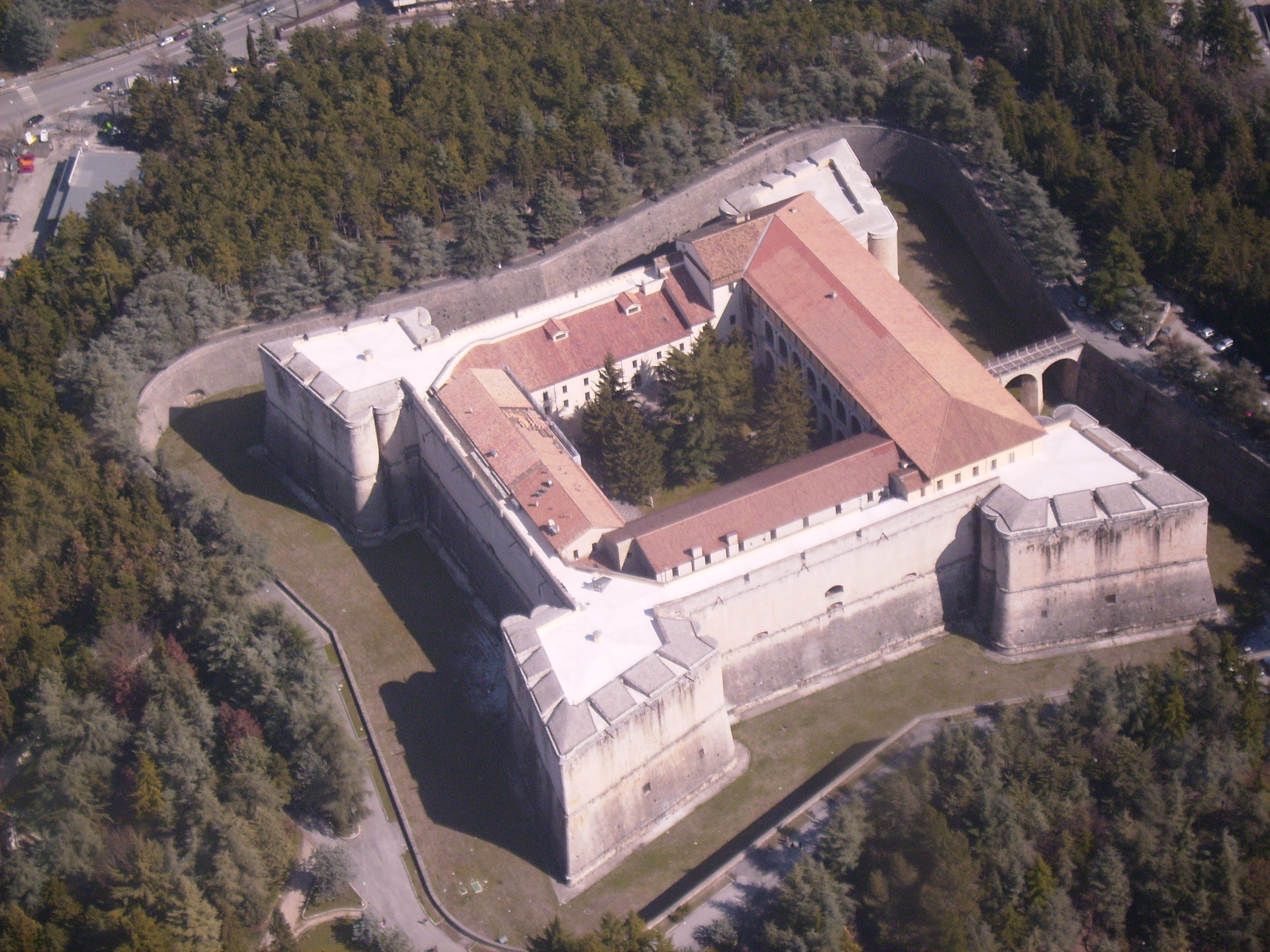
The Spanish fort.

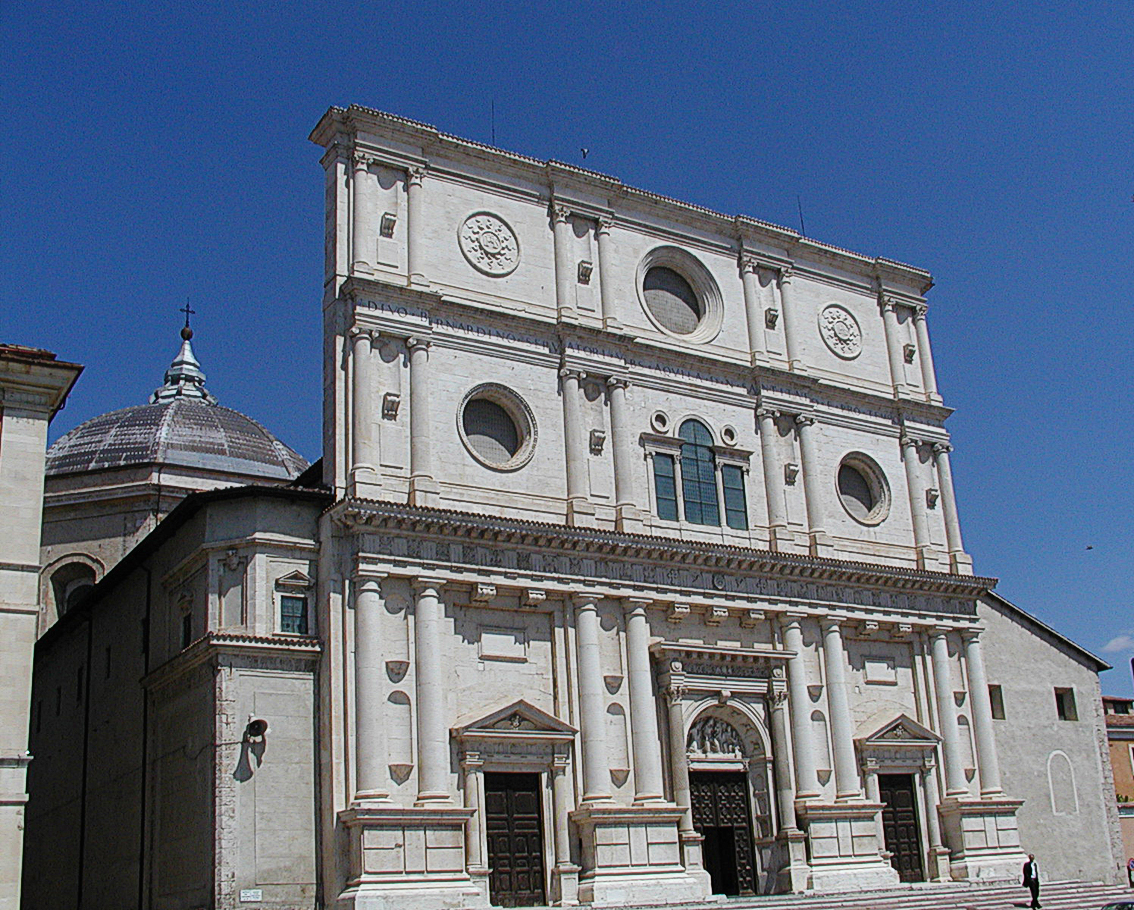
Basilica of San Bernardino

Although less than an hour-and-a-half drive from Rome, and popular with Romans for summer hiking and winter skiing in surrounding mountains, the city is sparsely visited by tourists. Among the sights are:

=== Religious buildings ===
- L'Aquila Cathedral: main church dedicated to Saint Maximus of Aveia (San Massimo), was built in the 13th century, but razed after the 1703 earthquake. The most recent façade dated from the 19th century, but the earthquake of 2009 and subsequent aftershocks collapsed parts of the transept and possibly more of the cathedral.
- Basilica of San Bernardino (1472): church has a fine Renaissance façade by Nicola Filotesio (commonly called Cola dell'Amatrice), and contains the monumental tomb of the saint (1480), decorated with sculptures, and executed by Silvestro Ariscola.
- Santa Maria di Collemaggio: church just outside the town, has a very fine, but simple, Romanesque façade (1270–1280) in red and white marble, with three decorated portals and a rose-window above each. The two side doors are also fine. The interior contains the mausoleum of Pope Celestine V erected in 1517.
- Santa Giusta: Romanesque façade with Gothic rose window
- San Silvestro: 14th-century Romanesque façade with Gothic rose window
- Chiesa dei Santi Marciano e Nicandro: a 13th century church

=== Secular buildings ===
- Spanish fort (Forte Spagnolo): massive castle in the highest part of the town, erected in 1534 by the Spanish viceroy Don Pedro de Toledo. In 2016, home to the National Museum of Abruzzo.
- Fontana Luminosa ("Luminous Fountain"): a 1930s sculpture of two women bearing large jars.
- Fontana delle novantanove cannelle (1272): a fountain with ninety-nine jets distributed along three walls. The source of the fountain is still unknown.
- L'Aquila cemetery: includes grave of Karl Heinrich Ulrichs, 19th‑century German gay rights pioneer who lived in L'Aquila; every year, gay people from all over the world meet at the cemetery to honour his memory.
- Palace of Nobles
- Roman ruins of Amiternum: ruins of an Ancient Roman city

Also nearby are several ski resorts like Gran Sasso d'Italia, the highest of the Apennines where in its valley the movie The Name of the Rose was filmed in the end of the 1980s. The town also contains some fine palaces: the municipality has a museum, with a collection of Roman inscriptions and some illuminated service books. The Palazzi Dragonetti and Persichetti contain private collections of pictures.

== Culture ==
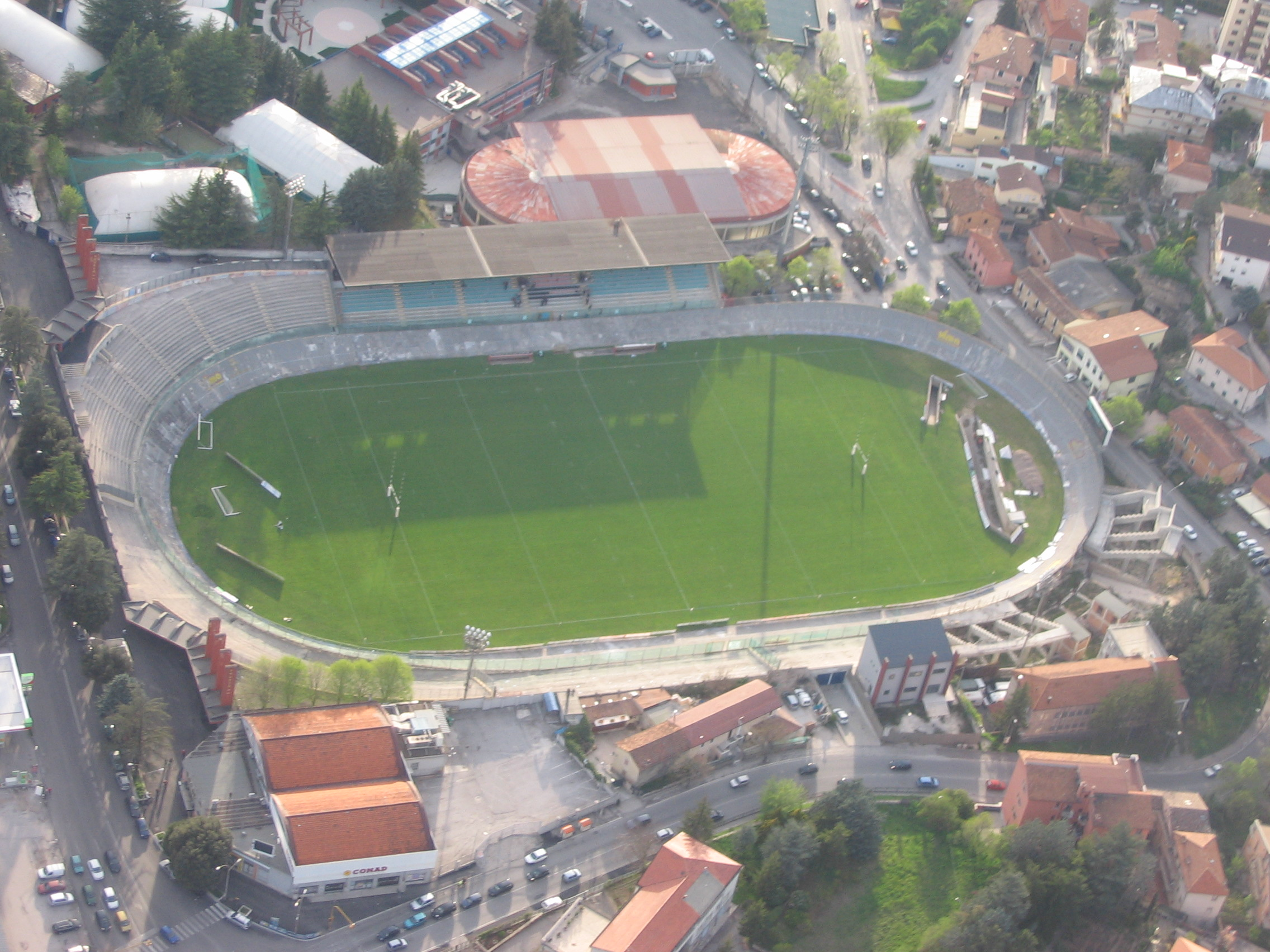
Tommaso Fattori Stadium

=== Cinematographic activities ===
The first step of L'Aquila in the cinematographic activities was the Cineforum Primo Piano founded by Gabriele Lucci in the middle of the 1970s. As a work of Lucci, in 1981 saw the establishment of l'Istituto Cinematografico dell'Aquila, an institute for the production and diffusion of the cinematographic culture in Italia and abroad.

The Teatro Stabile d'Abruzzo is based in the city and was formed in 2000.

=== Sport ===
The city is the home of five-time Italian champions L'Aquila Rugby. The football squad, L'Aquila Calcio, played 3 times in serie B.

== International relations ==
L'Aquila is twinned with:

- Baalbek, Lebanon
- Bernalda, Italy
- Bistrița, Romania
- Cuenca, Spain
- Foggia, Italy
- Haining, China
- Hobart, Australia
- Rottweil, Germany
- San Carlos de Bariloche, Argentina
- Sant'Angelo d'Alife, Italy
- Siena, Italy
- Washington, D.C., United States
- York, Toronto, Canada
- Zielona Góra, Poland

== Transport ==
L'Aquila railway station, on the Terni–Sulmona railway, is the main train station of the city, with trains to Terni, Rieti and Sulmona. L'Aquila–Preturo Airport is located 7.4 km (5 mi) northwest of the city. However, the airport is not operating commercial flights but is still open for private flights to come in and out of the airport. The nearest commercial airports are Abruzzo Airport, located 103 km (64 mi) to the east and Rome's Leonardo da Vinci Rome Fiumicino Airport, located 148 km (92 mi) south west of L'Aquila.

As of November 2025 there is still no clear bus connection from the train station. It's an uphill 45 minute walk. There is no regular bus that departs from directly outside the train station and the city is not covered by Uber or other systems. There is no signage and no way to find a connection to the city from the train station.

== Notable people ==
- Appius Claudius Caecus, (Amiternum, 350 B.C. – ?, 271 B.C.), Roman politician
- Sallustius (4th century), historian
- Celestine V, (?, 1215 – Fumone, 1296), saint
- Buccio di Ranallo, (Aquila 1294 – Aquila 1363), epic poet, historian, Count of Pettino
- Braccio da Montone, (Perugia, 1368 – Aquila, 1424), condottiero
- Bernardino da Siena, (Massa Marittima, 1380 – Aquila, 1444), saint
- John of Capistrano, (Capestrano, 1386 – Ilok, 1456), saint
- Amico Agnifili, (Rocca di Mezzo, 1398 – Aquila, 1476), Cardinal
- Antonia of Florence (1402–1472), saint
- Giovanbattista Branconio dell'Aquila, (Aquila, 1473 – 1522), papal protonotary, friend of Raphael
- Marco Dall'Aquila (c.1480-after 1538), lutenist and composer
- Mariangelo Accorso, (Aquila, 1489 – Aquila, 1546), Humanist
- Pompeo Cesura, (Aquila, ? – Rome, 1571), painter
- Karl Heinrich Ulrichs (1825–1895), writer
- Raffaele Cappelli (1848–1921), politician
- Nestore Leoni (1862–1947), painter
- Nazzareno De Angelis (1881–1962), opera singer
- Amleto Vespa (1888–1940), spy for Japan
- Corrado Bafile (1903–2005), Cardinal
- Trebisonda Valla, (Bologna 1916 – L'Aquila 2006), Athlete
- Lorenzo Natali, (Florence, 1922 – Rome, 1989), vice-president of the European Commission.
- Ferdinando Bologna (1925–2019), Art historian
- Carlo Franchi (1938–2021), racing driver
- Paul Piccone (1940–2004), founder and editor of TELOS
- Roberto Ruscitti (b. 1941), composer
- Mario Magnotta (1942–2009), janitor and internet phenomena
- Bruno Vespa (b. 1944), journalist
- Claudia Romani (b. 1982), model
- Nicola Di Francia (born 1985), footballer

== See also ==
- Orazio di Santis
- Santa Giusta (Bazzano, L'Aquila)
- 2009 L'Aquila earthquake
- L'Aquila Cathedral

== Sources ==
- Poland, Chris; Razzano, Holly; Scott, Andrew; Hernandez, Ricardo (2009). "L'Aquila, Italy: The Next Lesson". Civil Engineering. 79 (11): 46–53. doi:10.1061/ciegag.0000254. ISSN 0885-7024.
- Bindi, V. (1889). Monumenti storici ed artistici degli Abruzzi. Naples. p. 771 seq.
