= Buccio di Ranallo =

Italian medieval writer

Buccio di Ranallo (Italian pronunciation: [ˈbuttʃo di raˈnallo]; c. 1294 – 1363) was an Italian poet, writer, and Count of Pettino, known for a historical chronicle (Cronica) about L'Aquila, his native town, which covers the period from 1254 to 1362.

== Bibliography ==
- Buccio di Ranallo (2008). Carlo De Matteis (ed.). Cronica. Florence: Edizioni del Galluzzo. ISBN 978-88-8450-257-5.
