= Sant'Elia, L'Aquila =

Coordinates: 42°20′14″N 13°25′08″E

Sant'Elia
- Frazione
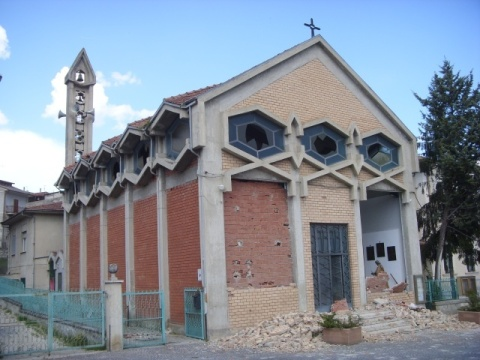
- Interactive map of Sant'Elia
- Country: Italy
- Region: Abruzzo
- Province: L'Aquila
- Commune: L'Aquila
- Time zone: UTC+1 (CET)
  - Summer (DST): UTC+2 (CEST)

Sant'Elia is a frazione of L'Aquila in the Abruzzo, region of Italy.
