= Pianola, L'Aquila =

Coordinates: 42.31667°N 13.4°E

Pianola
- Frazione
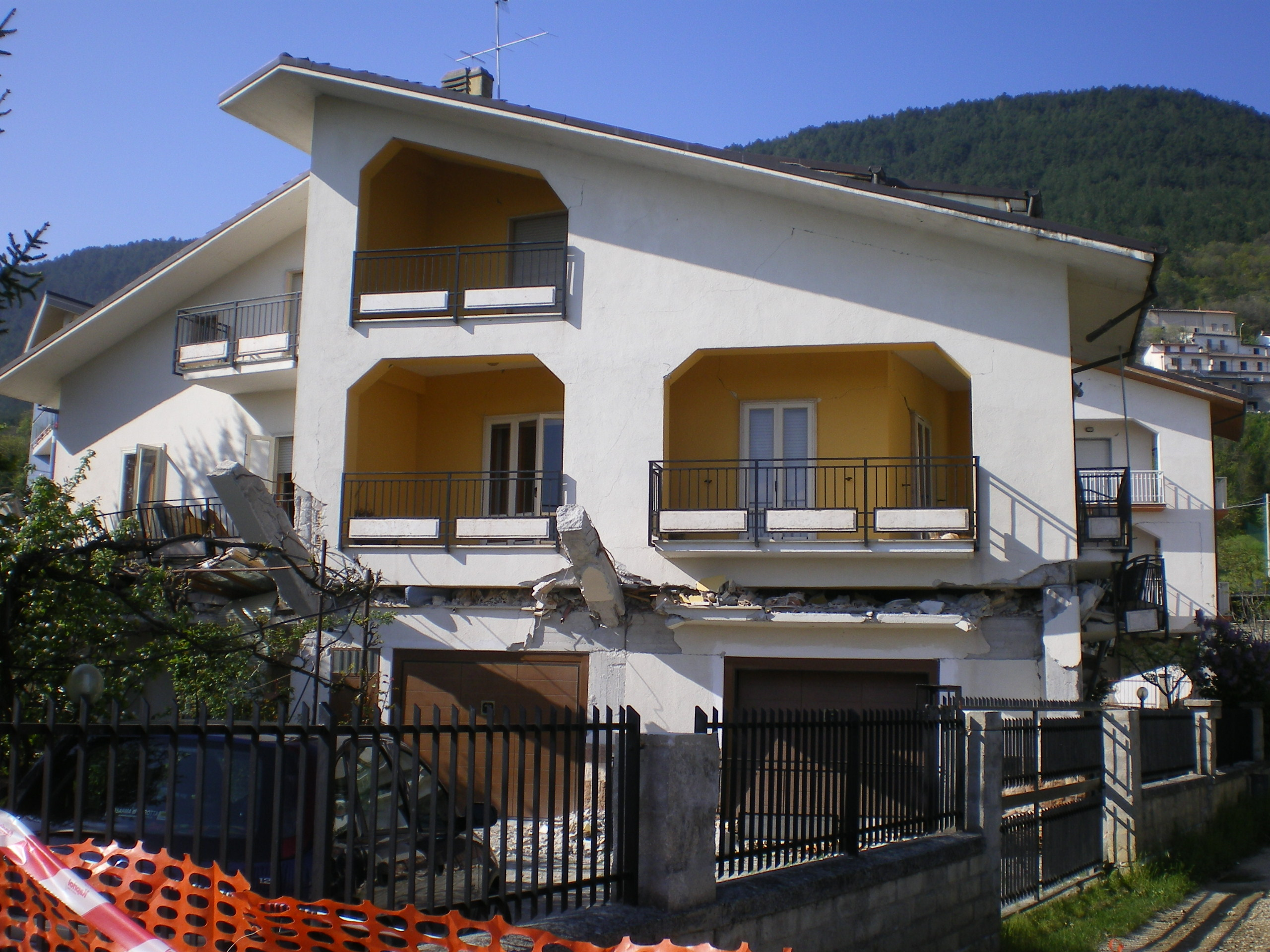
- Interactive map of Pianola
- Country: Italy
- Region: Abruzzo
- Province: L'Aquila
- Commune: L'Aquila
- Elevation: 726 m (2,382 ft)
- Time zone: UTC+1 (CET)
  - Summer (DST): UTC+2 (CEST)
- Postal code: 67100

Pianola is a small village near L'Aquila, Abruzzo in central Italy. It is situated in the Apennine Mountains at 726 m (2,382 ft) above sea level.
