= L'Aquila–Preturo Airport =

Airport in Aquila, central Italy

L'Aquila–Preturo Airport Aeroporto dei Parchi – L'Aquila
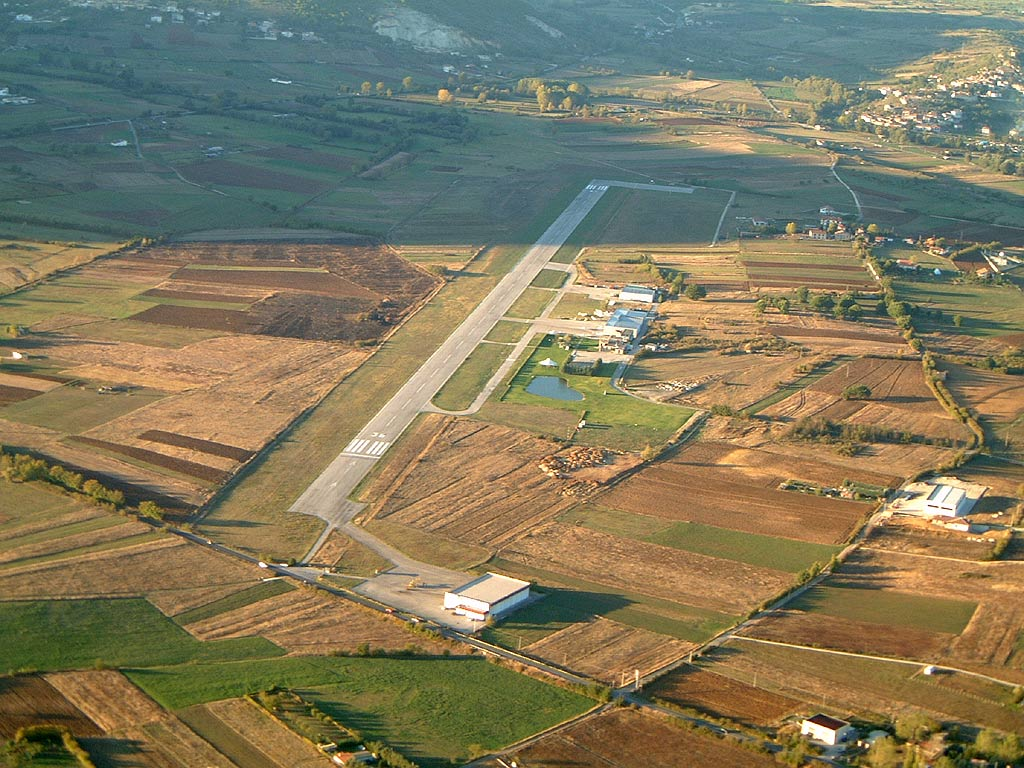
- IATA: QAQ; ICAO: LIAP

Summary
- Airport type: Public
- Operator: Aeroporto dei Parchi d'Abruzzo S. r. l.
- Serves: L'Aquila, Italy
- Elevation AMSL: 2,211 ft (674 m)
- Coordinates: 42°22′47″N 013°18′33″E
- Website: www.aeroportodeiparchi.it

Map
- Location of airport in Italy

Runways
Direction	Length		Surface
Direction	m	ft	Surface
18/36	1,409	4,623	Asphalt
- Source: DAFIF

L'Aquila–Preturo Airport (Italian: Aeroporto dei Parchi – L'Aquila) (IATA: QAQ, ICAO: LIAP), is an airport serving L'Aquila, a city and comune of the Abruzzo region in central Italy. The airport is also known as Parchi Airport, Preturo Airport (for the village at which it is located), and more complete combinations such as Aeroporto dei Parchi di I'Aquila Preturo. The airport is located 4 nautical miles (7.4 km; 4.6 mi) west-northwest of L'Aquila.

== Facilities ==
The airport resides at an elevation of 2,211 feet (674 m) above mean sea level. It has one runway designated 18/36 with an asphalt surface measuring 1,410 by 26 metres (4,626 ft × 85 ft).

== G8 ==
Following the earthquake that hit L'Aquila in 2009, the airport has played a key role in rescue operations. Hence, for example, helicopters evacuated more than 150 persons from San Salvatore Hospital. Before the G8 summit, the structure has been renewed and served by an adequate road system. The airport has been equipped with a parking lot and new buildings, including the Italian Civil Aviation Authority headquarters. PAPI and NDB systems have been installed and runway lighting was provided. During the G8, 146 aircraft, 2544 people and 37 delegations used the L'Aquila–Preturo Airport. Afterwards, the airport was declared fit to civil traffic.
On 24 August 2011, the airport has been officially certified as Second Class according to International Civil Aviation Organization rules; it can operate with aircraft up to 12 m (39 ft) long, seating 20 to 42 persons.

== Recent developments ==
In April 2015, the Italian authority for civil aviation (ENAC) declared the airport closed to commercial flights. The decision came out by the fact that the air traffic never concretized in a certain way. The airport remains open for private flights.

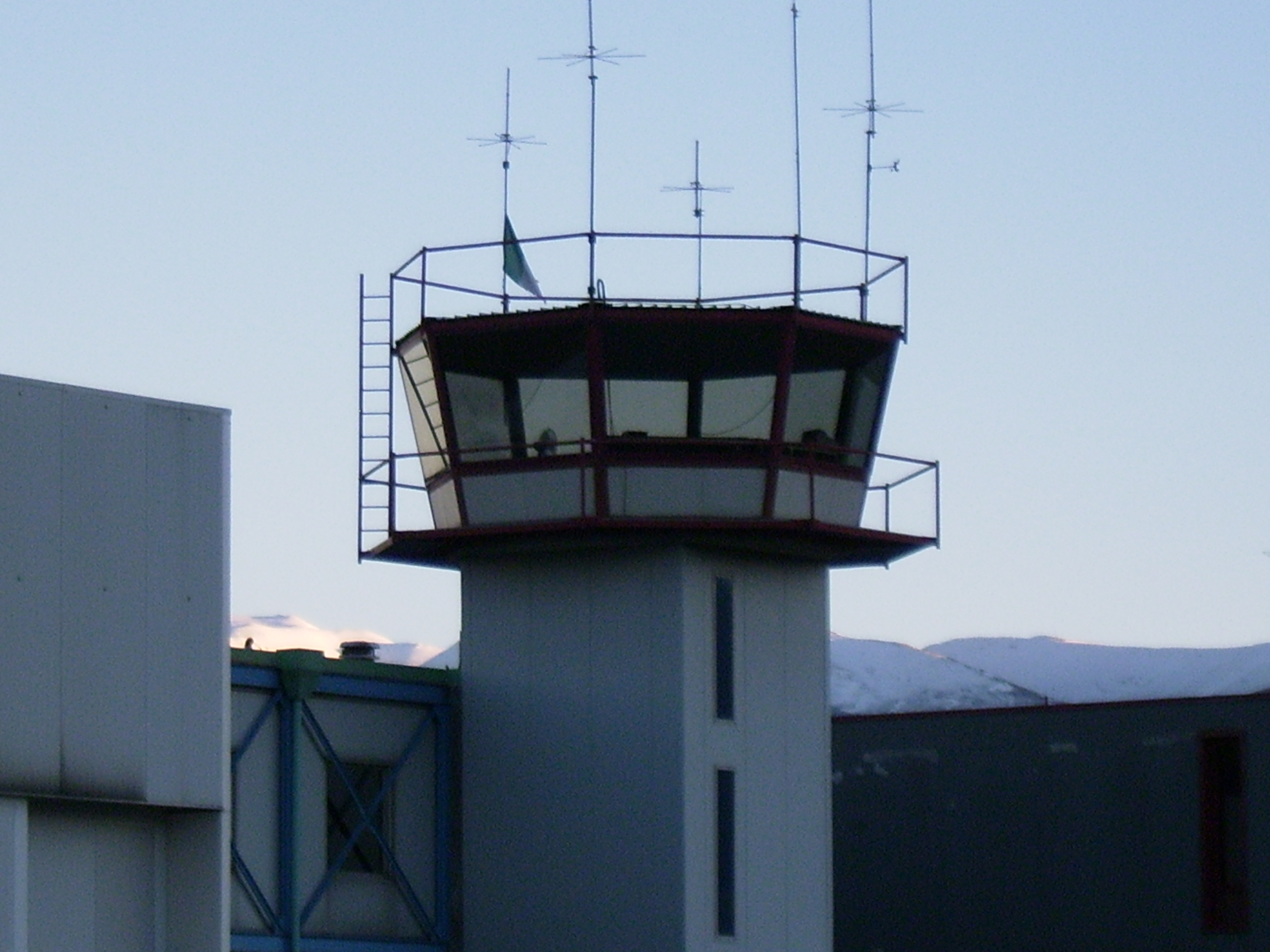
Control tower

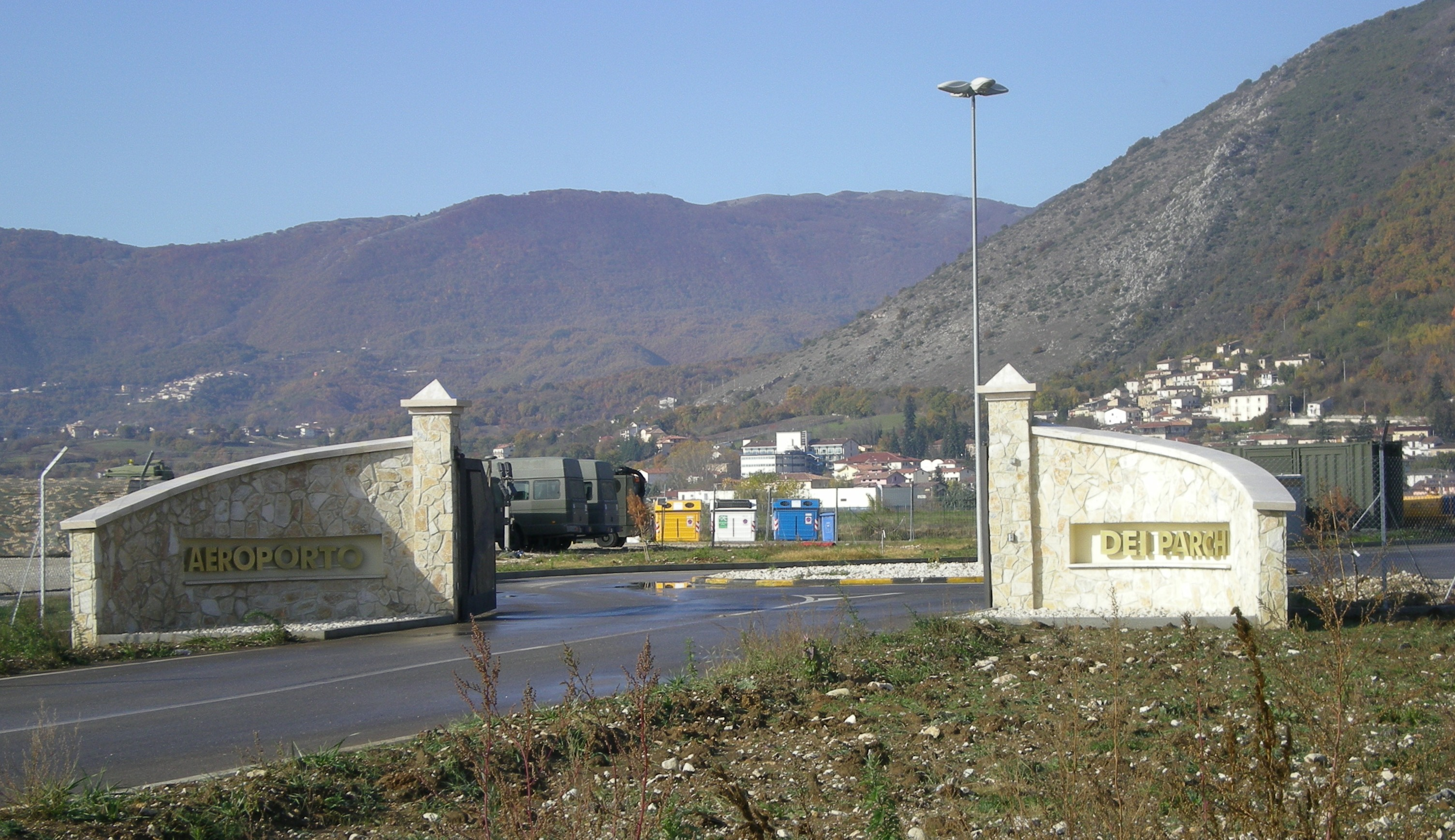
Main entrance

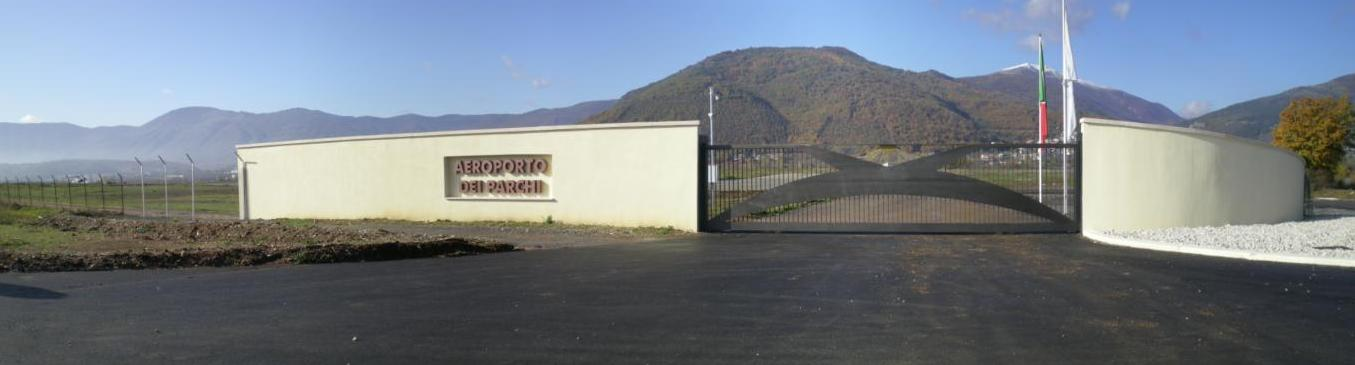
North entrance

== See also ==
- List of airports in Italy
