= Maximus of Aveia =

3rd-century Christian saint and martyr

Saint Maximus of Aquila
- Died: ~250 AD
- Venerated in: Roman Catholic Church
- Feast: June 10
- Patronage: L'Aquila

Saint Maximus of Aveia (died c. 250 AD) (sometimes also known as Saint Maximus of Aquila) is one of the patron saints of L'Aquila, Italy.

== Life ==
He was born in Aveia, currently known as Fossa. As a deacon, he was martyred for his faith. Tradition says that he was tortured and then thrown over a cliff near his native city. This occurred during the persecutions of the Roman Emperor Decius.

In 1256, the episcopal seat of Aveia was moved to L'Aquila, together with the relics of Maximus. The newly built cathedral of the Roman Catholic Archdiocese of L'Aquila was dedicated in his name and that of Saint George, another martyr.

== See also ==
- Catholic Church in Italy
- List of early Christian saints
- Saint Maximus of Aveia, patron saint archive
