= Santa Maria di Collemaggio =

Italian Roman Catholic church

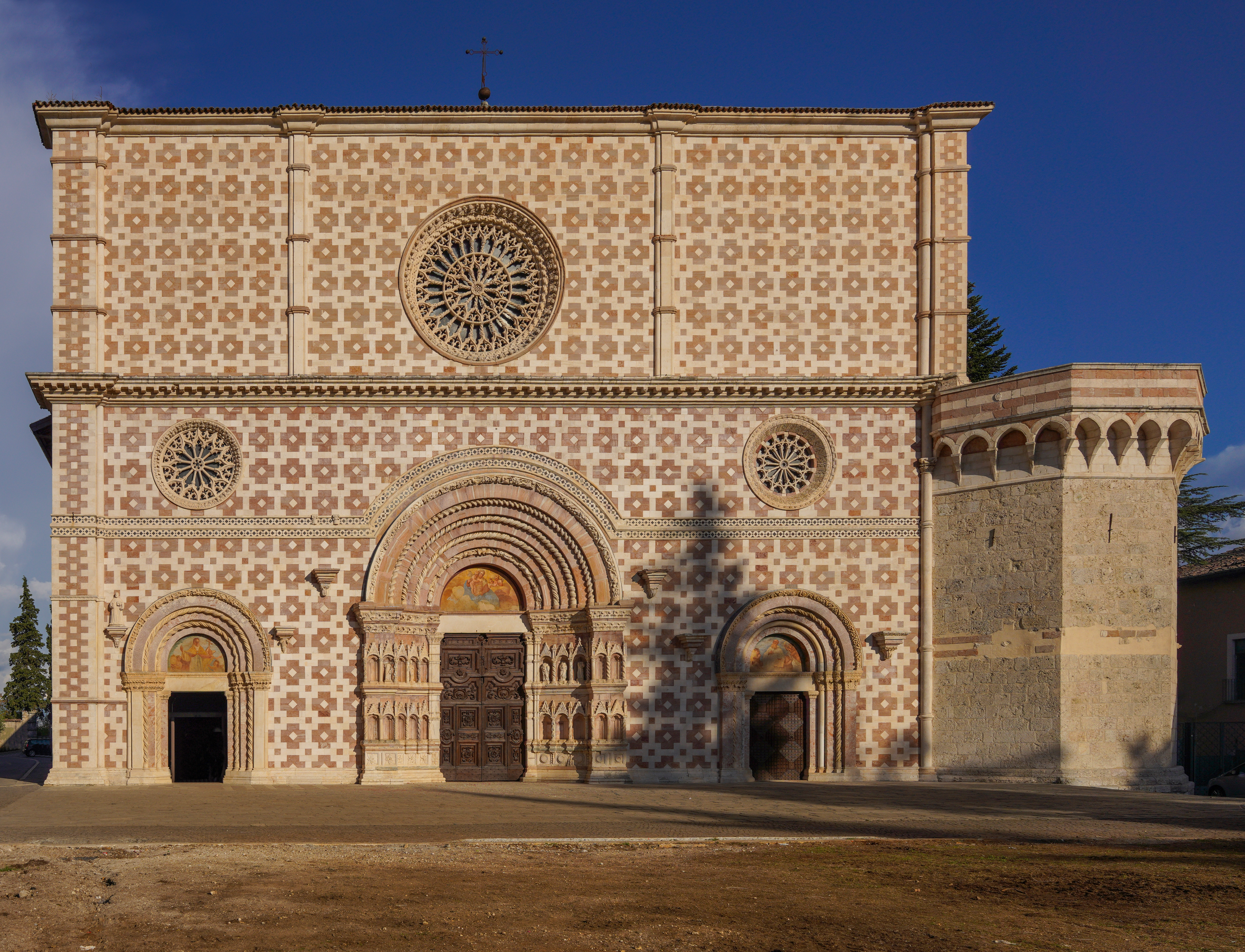
- The façade of Santa Maria di Collemaggio

Religion
- Affiliation: Roman Catholic Church
- Province: Archdiocese of L'Aquila
- Ecclesiastical or organisational status: Basilica

Location
- Location: L'Aquila, Italy
- Interactive map of Santa Maria di Collemaggio
- Coordinates: 42°20′34″N 13°24′17″E

Architecture
- Type: Church
- Style: Romanesque, Gothic
- Groundbreaking: 1287

Santa Maria di Collemaggio is a large medieval church in L'Aquila, central Italy. It was the site of the original Papal Jubilee, a penitential observation devised by Pope Celestine V, who is buried there. The church, which therefore ranks as a basilica because of its importance in religious history, sits in isolation at the end of a long rectangular sward of grass at the southwest edge of the town.

The church is a masterpiece of Abruzzese Romanesque and Gothic architecture and one of the chief sights of L'Aquila. The striking jewel-box effect of the exterior is due to a pattern of blocks of alternating pink and white stone; the interior, on the other hand, is massive and austere. Outbuildings include a colonnaded cloister, with the central fountain typical of many other similar Italian cloisters, and the former monastic refectory.

Parts of the structure were significantly damaged in the 2009 earthquake in L'Aquila and the church was reopened in 2017.

== History ==
In 1274, while traveling through L'Aquila, a hermit from Morrone named Pietro, founder of the Celestine Order, spent the night on a nearby hill, the Colle di Maggio, and had a dream in which the Virgin Mary, surrounded by angels at the top of a golden stairway, asked him to build a church there in her honor. In 1287 the Celestines bought the land, started construction the following year, and consecrated the still-unfinished church in 1289. The hill that gave its name to the church no longer exists, the valley between it and the city having been filled in during the 19th century; further adjustments to the local topography were made in the 1930s to improve accessibility to the church.

On August 29, 1294, Pietro da Morrone was crowned Pope there, as Celestine V, and as part of his coronation instituted a plenary pardon of sins for all who would visit the church, confessed and repentant, on 28 and 29 August of any year. The "Celestinian Forgiveness" (in Italian: Perdonanza Celestiniana) is widely viewed by church historians as the immediate ancestor of the Jubilee and Holy Year instituted only six years later by Pope Boniface VIII; and it is still celebrated at the church, thousands of pilgrims converging on L'Aquila for it every year. A Holy Door similar to the one in Rome was added to the church in the 14th century; a fresco in the lunette appropriately depicts the Virgin and Child, St. John the Baptist and St. Celestine.

The church continued to be embellished during the Middle Ages, impetus being provided by the canonization of St. Celestine in 1313 and the translation of his relics in 1327.

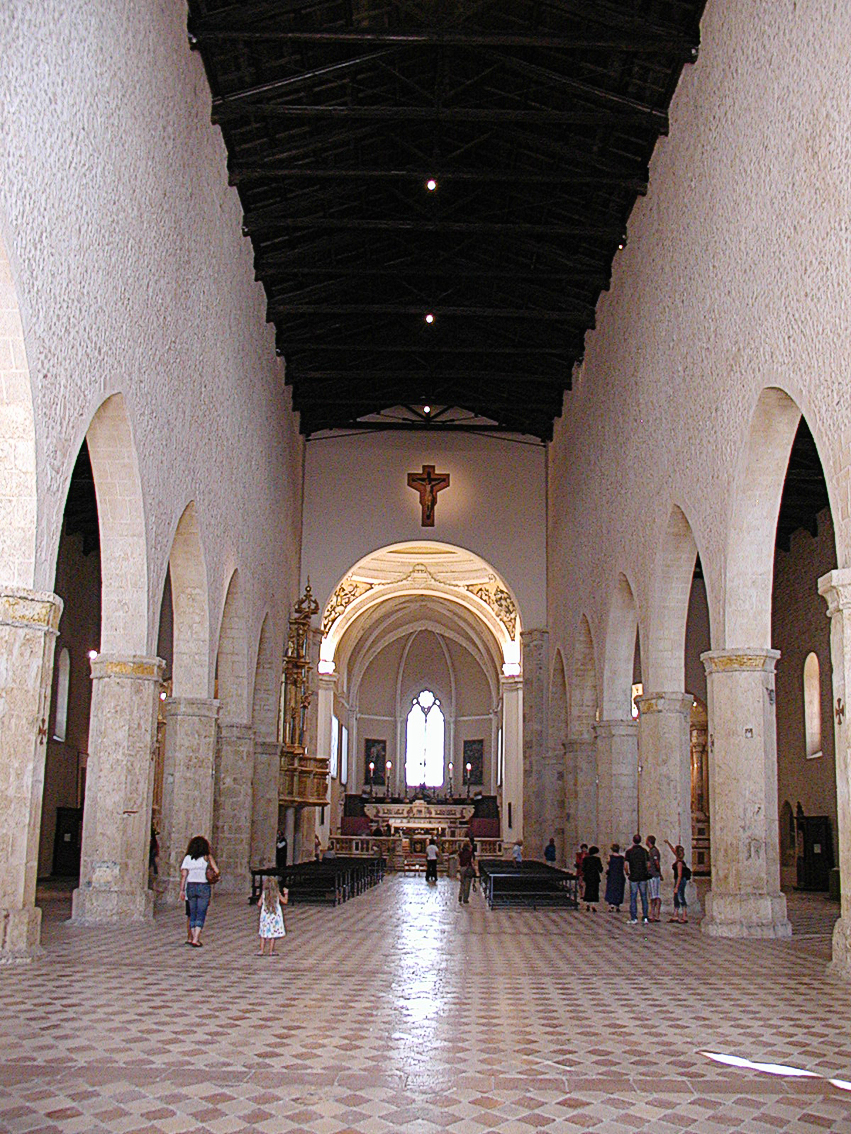
Interior view before the 2009 earthquake

The dome of Santa Maria di Collemaggio collapsed in the 1461 L'Aquila earthquake. A wall of the church collapsed in the earthquake that hit L'Aquila on April 6, 2009. In the first post-quake images of the area, the facade of the church still stands behind the restoration scaffolding. Cracks have appeared in some areas of the walls. The most severe damage to the basilica was the roof and dome collapse over the transept and part of the choir. The tomb of Pope Celestine was also damaged. Works for the restoration of the building were concluded in 2017 and since then the church is open to the public.

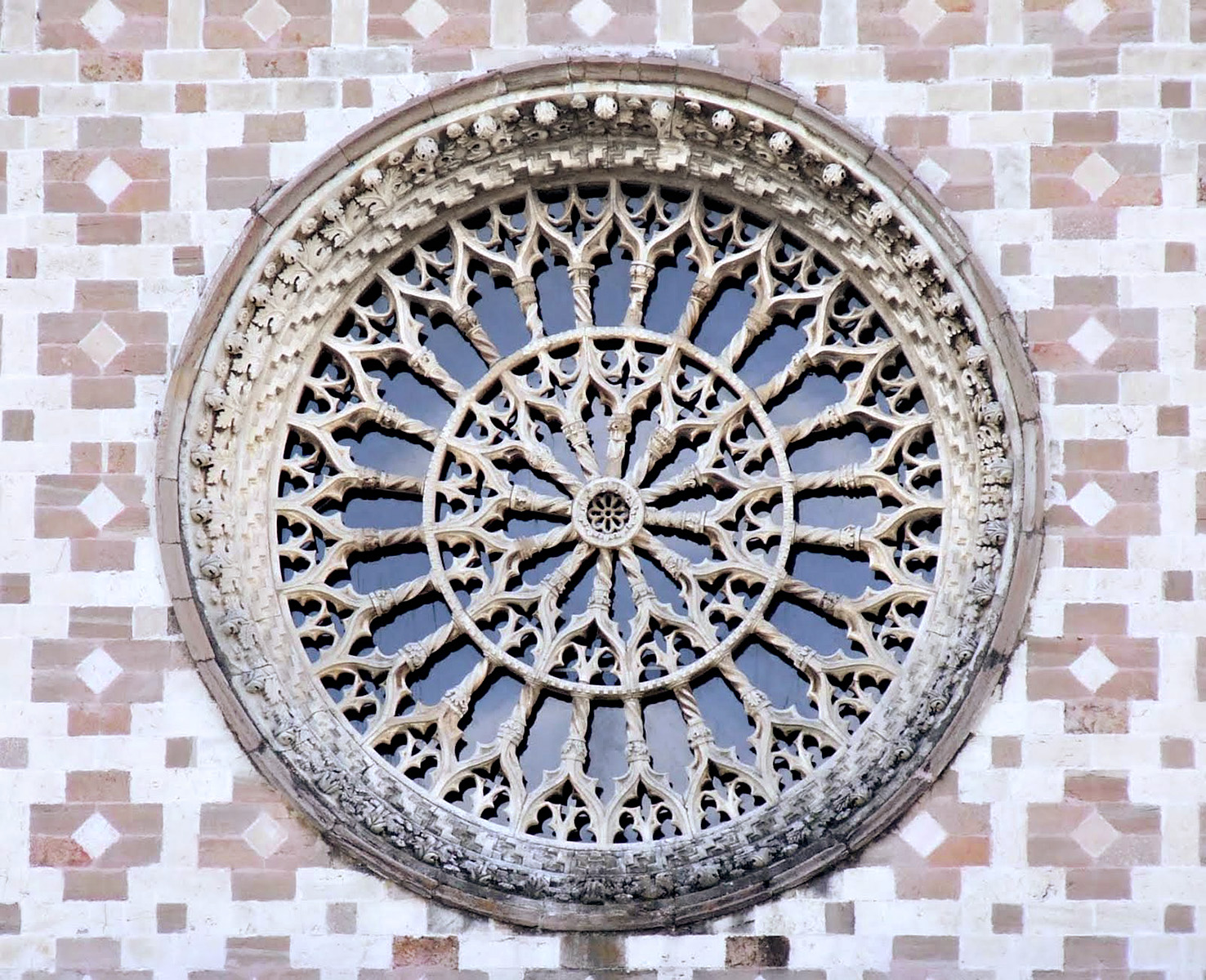
The central rose window

== Architecture ==
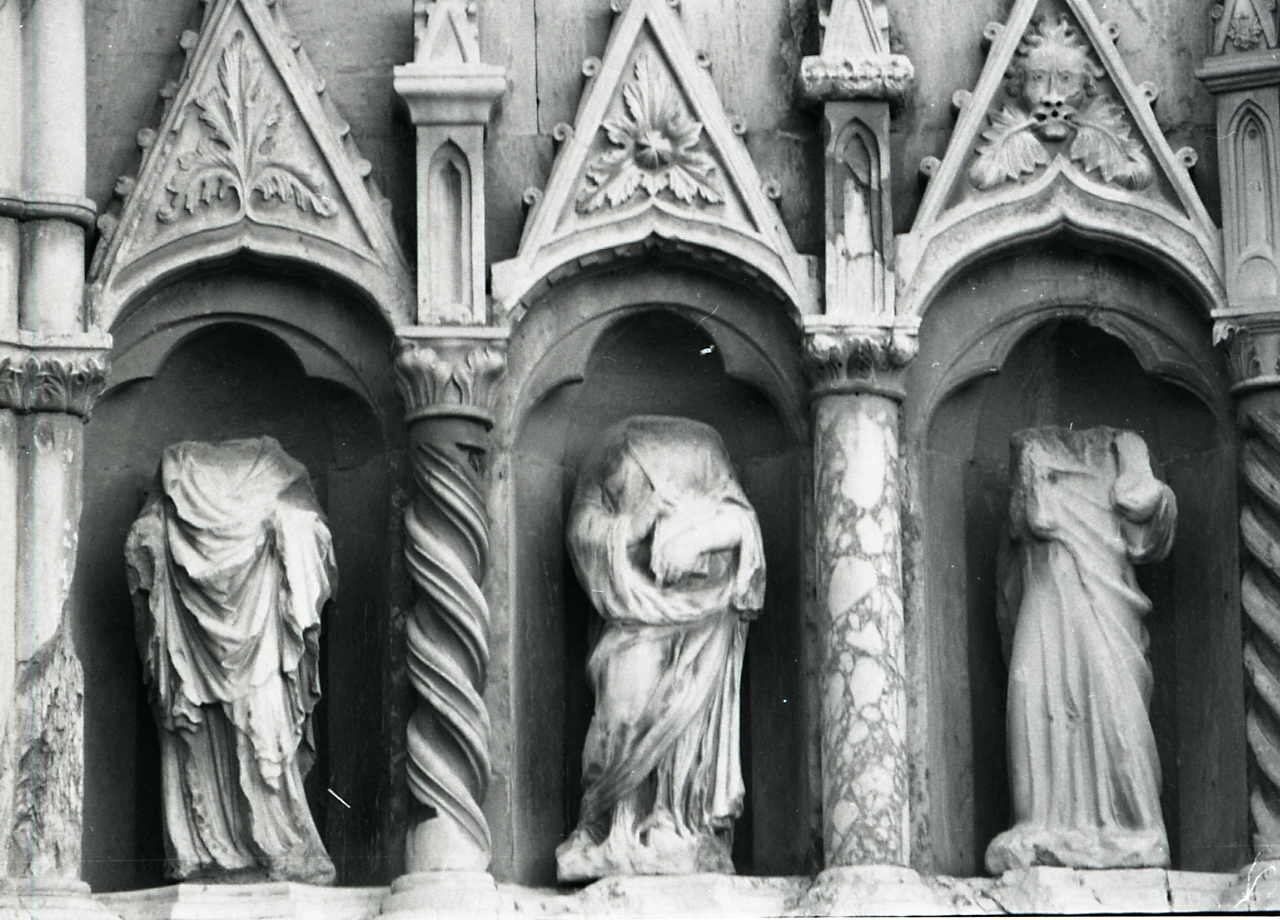
Detail of the tabernacles and statues of the main portal. Photo by Paolo Monti, 1969.

The elegant Romanesque façade has the appearance of a wall, with a central door, embellished in the 15th century, and two smaller flanking doors; each door is a round arch set into a series of archivolts, and each is surmounted by a rose window. The main decoration of the façade, however, consists in the use of contrasting stone arranged in a sort of tapestry of cruciform elements. The façade lacks any of the customary crowning gables or other superstructures and may be unfinished. An octagonal belfry, reduced to a stub after it had to be demolished following an earthquake, gives the building an asymmetrical appearance. The three portals and three rose-windows are all different. The central door was significantly reworked in the 15th century, decorated with blank niches arranged in two rows over a base composed of square panels carved with floral motifs.

A rear view of the church shows a congeries of various extensions over the centuries, mostly of the Gothic period.

The interior follows the standard plan of a nave and two side aisles, each one divided from it by a row of columns, from which arches support a tall wooden ceiling. The floor of the nave is in the same red and white stone as the façade.

A major restoration, aiming to return the church to its original Romanesque appearance by removing accretions over the centuries, was completed in 1972. This was the first time its furniture was actually refurbished.

The church's principal monument, in the right aisle next to the choir, is the tomb of pope Celestine V. Commissioned by a guild of wool workers in 1517, it is the work of Girolamo da Vicenza, and contains the remains of the Pope in a silver urn. The present urn was made at the end of the Second World War by Aquilan goldsmith Luigi Cardilli: it replaced an urn stolen by French troops in 1646, which itself replaced the first urn, removed by the Prince of Orange in 1530. The transept also includes two Baroque altarpieces, one of which includes a 14th-century statue of the Virgin, often attributed to Silvestro dell'Aquila, a pupil of Donatello.

The interior of the church is not profusely decorated, or at least not much decoration has come down to us, but includes 14th- and 15th-century frescoes by an anonymous local artist, depicting scenes of the Virgin's life: the Virgin Mary between St. Agnes and St. Apollonia, a Dormition of the Virgin, and a Coronation. The church also contains a Crucifixion with St. Julian (who is specially venerated in L'Aquila), an early 16th-century frescoed niche of a Virgin with Child and Saints, and fourteen oversized 17th-century paintings by Karl Ruther, a monk of Gdańsk, representing episodes from the life of St. Celestine.

== Sources ==
- Touring Club Italiano (2005). Abruzzo: L'Aquila e il Gran Sasso, Chieti, Pescara, Teramo, i parchi e la costa adriatica (in Italian). Touring Editore.
- Carla Bartolomucci (2004). Santa Maria di Collemaggio: interpretazione critica e problemi di conservazione (in Italian). Roma, Palombi.
- Giannandrea Capecchi e Maria Grazia Lopardi (2009). Notre Dame di Collemaggio. Conoscenze e misteri degli antichi costruttori (in Italian). Roma, Arkeios.
- Carlo Cilleni Nepis (1894). Il tempio di Collemaggio (in Italian). L'Aquila, Giuseppe Mele.
- Leonida Giardini, Marcello Pezzuti, Fabio Redi (2006). Celestino V e la sua Basilica (in Italian). Cinisello Balsamo (BG), Silvana Editore.
- Roberto Grillo (2000). Il luogo del perdono (in Italian). L'Aquila, Idearte.
- Luigi Lopez (1987). Celestino V, la Perdonanza, Collemaggio (in Italian). L'Aquila, Tazzi.
- Mario Moretti (1972). Collemaggio (in Italian). Tivoli (RM), De Luca.
- Fabiano Petricone (2005). La Basilica di Santa Maria di Collemaggio all'Aquila: guida storica, artistica, religiosa (in Italian). L'Aquila, GTE.
