= Necropolis of Fossa =

Archaeological site in Fossa (AQ), Italy

- Necropoli di Fossa
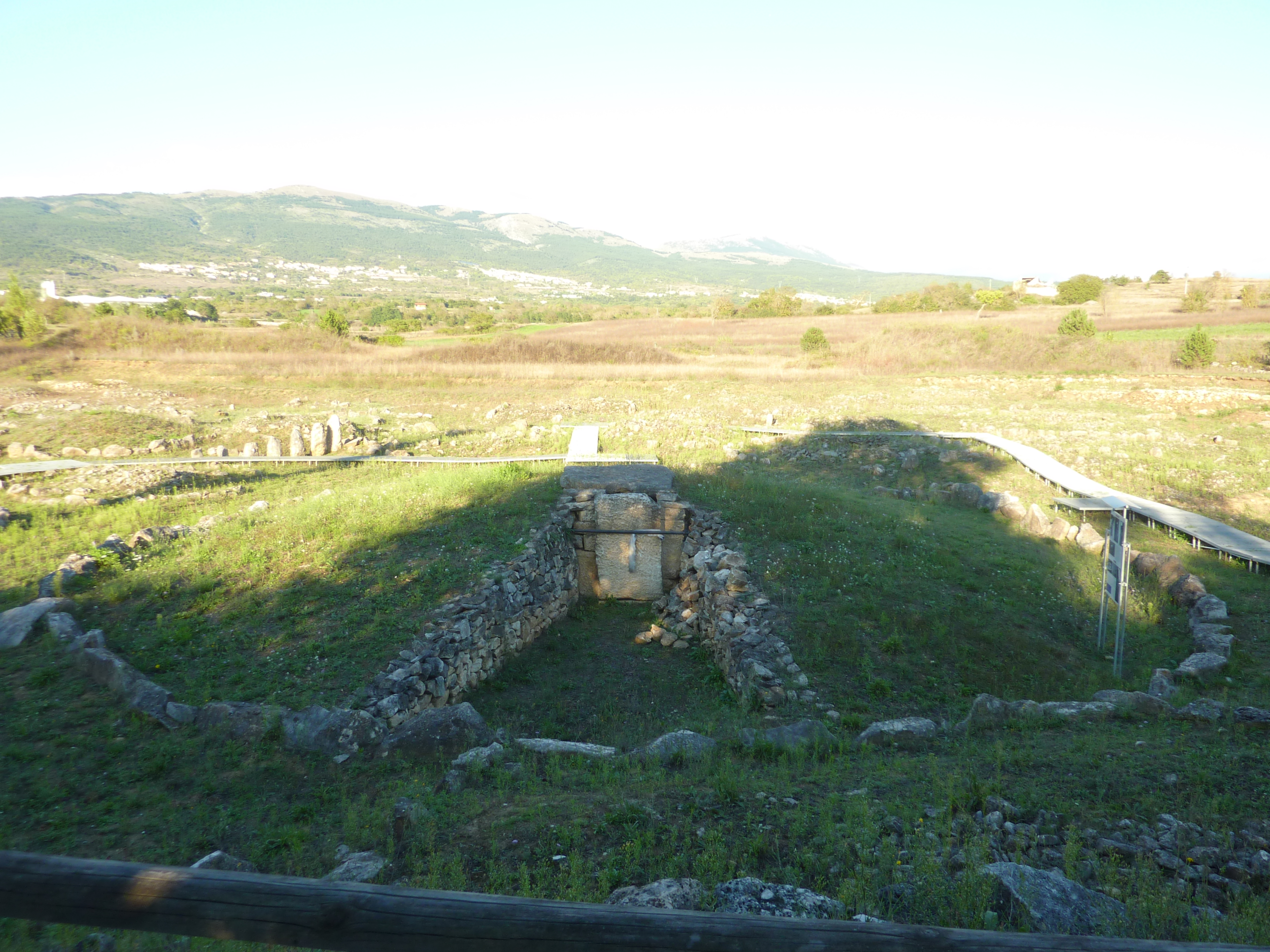
- View of the necropolis

- Location within Abruzzo
- 42.310764°N 13.505018°E
- Type: Necropolis
- Periods: Italic peoples
- Cultures: Vestini
- Location: Fossa
- Region: Abruzzo

Site notes
- Management: Comune of Fossa
- Public access: yes

Necropolis of Fossa was an Italic necropolis, the ruins of which are located in the comune of Fossa, in the province of L'Aquila in the Abruzzo region of Italy.

== History ==
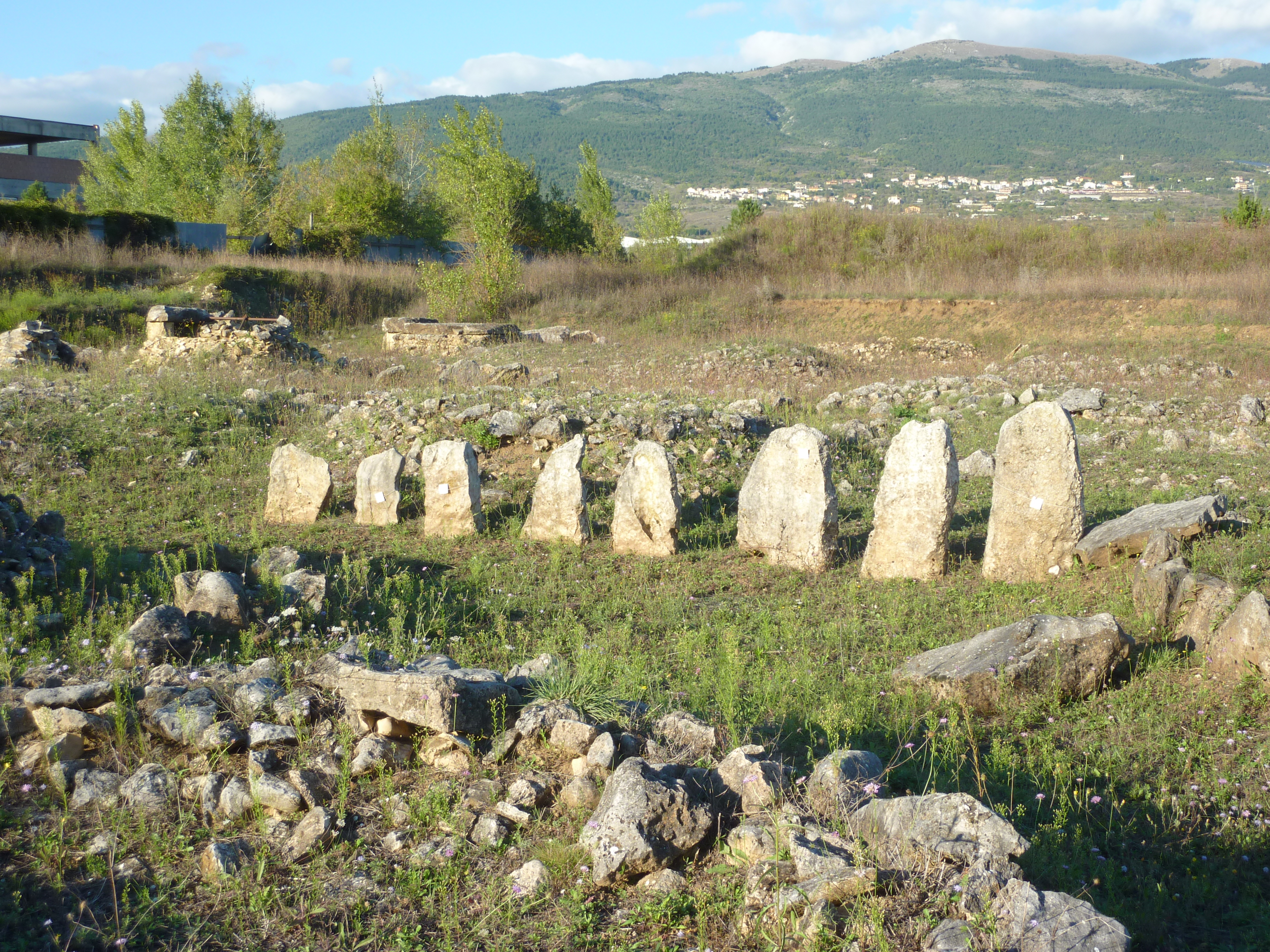
Menhir

The origins of the necropolis of Fossa are attributed to the first population residing in the area, the Vestini on Monte Cerro, where remains of a fortified village dating back to between the 9th and 8th century BC can be found. Later, the development of Aveia during the Roman era continued its use until around the 1st century BC.

The area is located in an alluvial zone on the eastern bank of the Aterno river. It was discovered accidentally in 1992 during excavations for the construction of an industrial warehouse.

The excavated area covers 3,500 m², with approximately 500 tombs of different types (tumuli, pits, chamber tombs, and infant burials in ceramic tiles) dating back to three main periods.

== Iron Age ==
In the first two centuries (9th and 8th centuries BC), the tombs primarily consisted of tumuli and simple pits dug into the ground.

The tumuli were constructed with mounds of earth and stones, typically measuring between eight and fifteen meters in diameter, enclosed by stone circles. Some male tumuli featured a line of menhir of decreasing height from the inside out.

Inside the tumulus was the pit where the deceased and some of their personal effects, typically ceramic or bronze vessels, razors, and weapons for men, and jewelry for women, were buried.

== Orientalizing and Archaic Ages ==
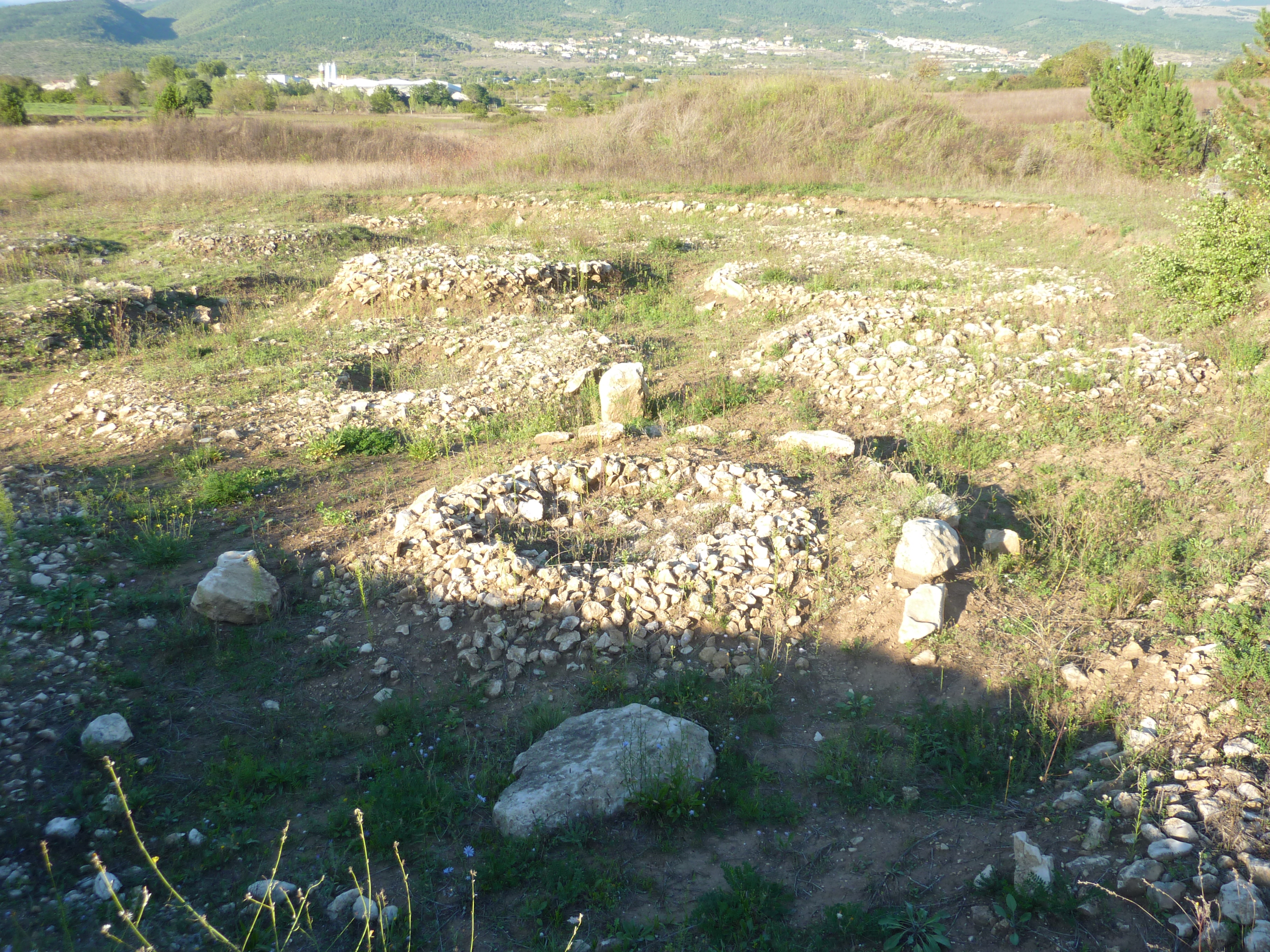
Tumuli

In the following two centuries (8th-6th century BC), both pits and tumuli continued to be built, though the latter were now around 4 meters in diameter, and the lines of menhir for male tombs disappeared.

Regarding the grave goods, female tombs continued to contain jewelry, while male tombs contained weapons, including chest-protecting discs similar to those worn by the Warrior of Capestrano. In addition to local ceramics, imported vases, typically Etruscan, appeared.

By the 6th century, the use of tumuli ended, and simple pit graves became prevalent. Additionally, infant burials began, where newborns were placed in a ceramic tile and covered with another.

== Hellenistic Age ==
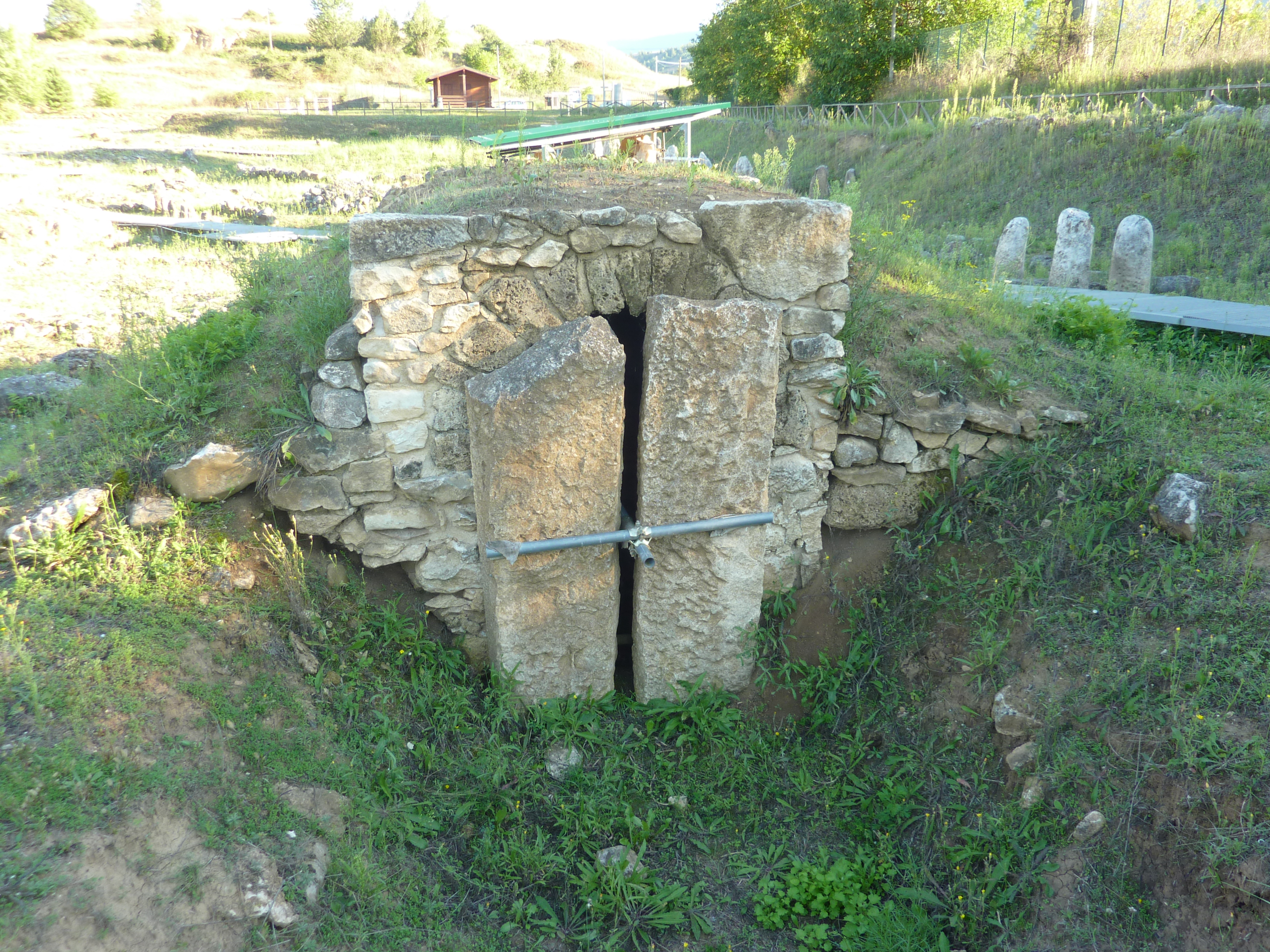
Chamber tomb

In the first phase (4th-3rd century BC), the tombs were exclusively pit graves for single burials. The grave goods no longer contained weapons but included ceramics and jewelry.

In the late Hellenistic period (2nd-1st century BC), monumental forms returned with chamber tombs, family hypogea with a quadrangular plan made of stone, accessed via a corridor with an entrance closed by one or two vertical stone slabs. Among the grave goods, notable items include funerary beds made of wood and leather, decorated with zoomorphic and anthropomorphic bone elements.

Other types of tombs in this period include box tombs (with stone or wooden walls), tombs with monumental markers, simple pit graves, and infant burials in ceramic tiles.

In the final century (1st century BC), alongside inhumation, cremation became widespread. The ashes of the deceased were collected in a jar closed with a flat stone or a ceramic lid and placed in the tomb without any grave goods.

== Bibliography ==
- Serena Cosentino; Gianfranco Mieli (2002). "La Necropoli Protostorica di Fossa". In Enrico Santangelo (ed.). Castelli e tesori d'arte della Media Valle dell'Aterno. Pescara: Carsa Edizioni. pp. 117–123. ISBN 88-501-0051-5.
- Serena Cosentino; Vincenzo d'Ercole; Gianfranco Mieli (2001). La Necropoli di Fossa vol. I - Le testimonianze più antiche. Pescara: Carsa Edizioni. p. 240. ISBN 978-88-501-0001-9.
- Vincenzo d'Ercole; Enrico Benelli, eds. (2004). La Necropoli di Fossa vol. II - I corredi orientalizzanti e arcaici. Pescara: Carsa Edizioni. p. 256. ISBN 978-88-501-0053-8.
- Vincenzo d'Ercole; Maria Rita Copersino, eds. (2003). La Necropoli di Fossa vol. IV - L'età ellenistico-romana. Pescara: Carsa Edizioni. p. 392. ISBN 978-88-501-0049-1.
