= Santa Maria ad Cryptas =

Church of Santa Maria ad Cryptas
- Chiesa di Santa Maria ad Cryptas
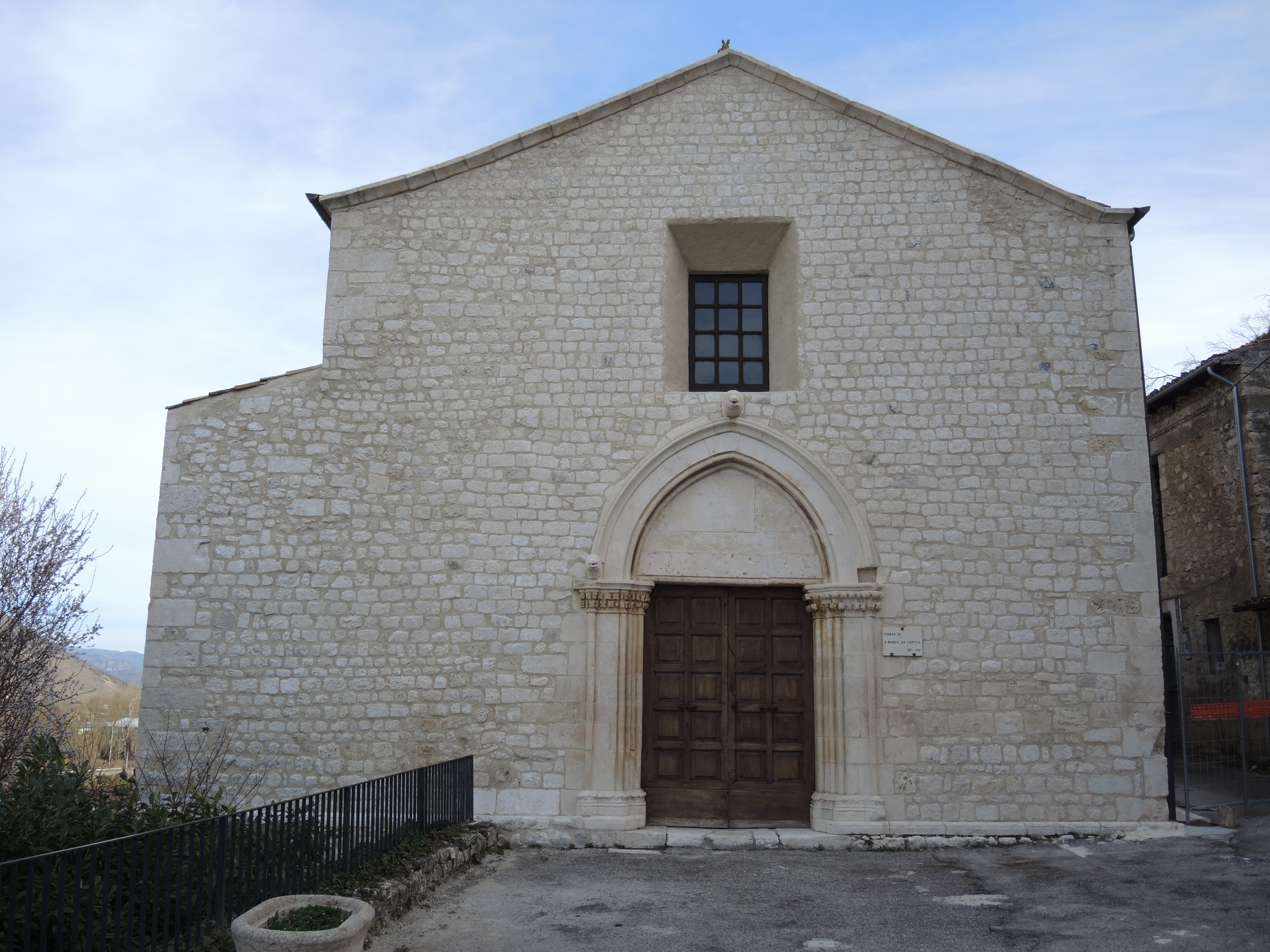
- View of the church

- Location within Abruzzo
- 42.3019°N 13.4839°E
- Location: Fossa
- Country: Italy
- Denomination: Catholic

History
- Status: Church

Architecture
- Functional status: Active
- Style: Romanesque
- Completed: 10th century

Administration
- Diocese: Archdiocese of L'Aquila

Chiesa di Santa Maria ad Cryptas (Italian for Church of Santa Maria ad Cryptas) is a Middle Ages church in Fossa, Province of L'Aquila (Abruzzo).

== History ==
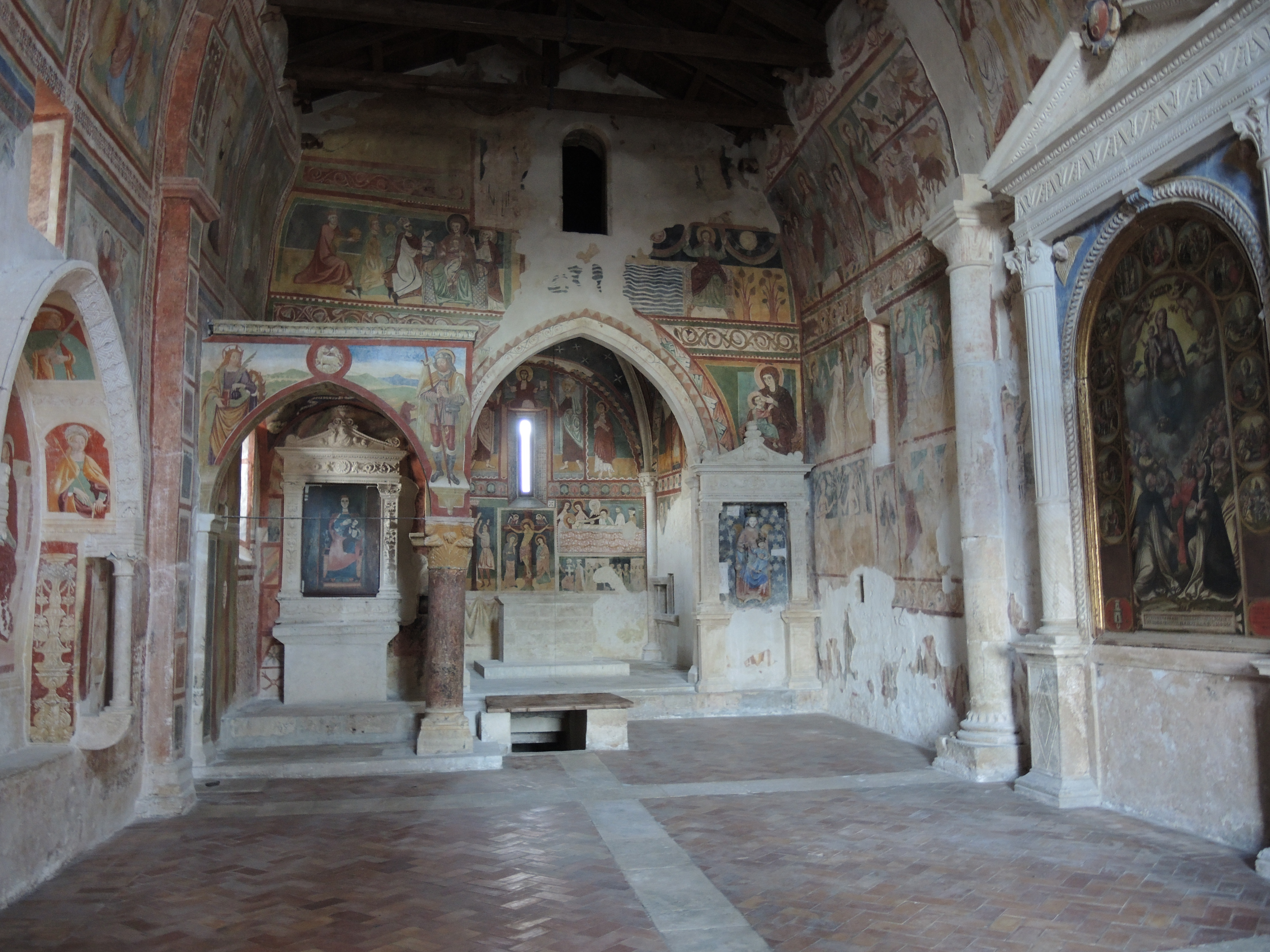
Interior

The Church of Santa Maria ad Cryptas (or of the Caves) is located about a kilometer from the center of the village of Fossa and a few kilometers from the Monastery of Santo Spirito (Ocre) in Ocre, upon which it depended. Presumably, the church was initially built as a Roman-Byzantine style temple in the 9th or 10th century AD with a crypt from which it derived its name.

Four centuries later, a Gothic-Cistercian building was constructed on the previous temple by Benedictine craftsmen. Its construction on a slope required consolidation works with a buried counterfort wall along the entire valley side and two support pillars at the ends of the church's lateral wall. Among the stones of the external masonry, remnants from the buildings of the Roman city of Aveia, on which the current Fossa was later built, can be observed.

The church was severely damaged by the 2009 L'Aquila earthquake. On April 28, 2019, after a long restoration, it was reopened for worship, almost ten years after the earthquake.

== Architecture ==
=== Exterior ===
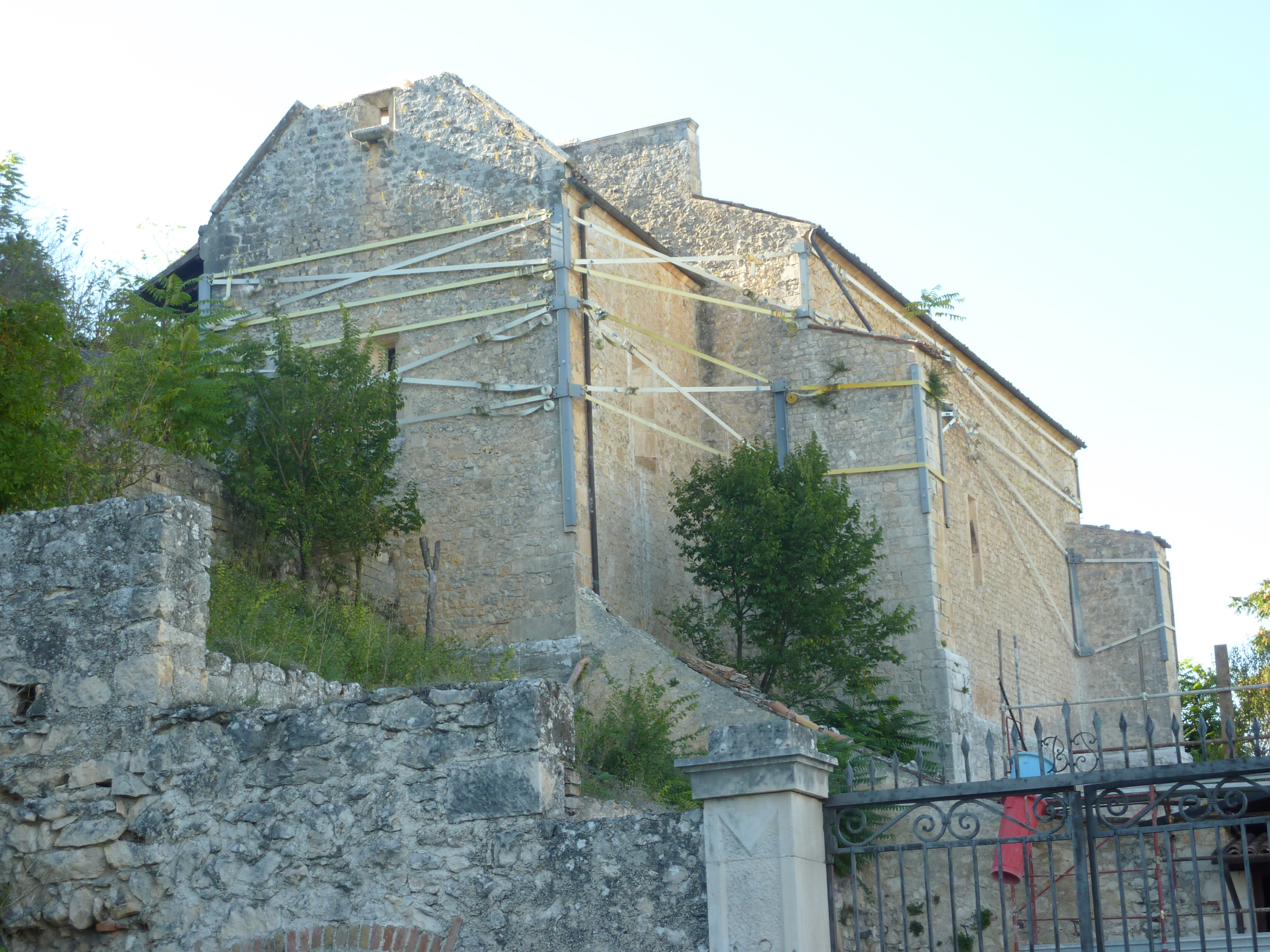
Side facade

The main facade on the west side is very simple and has a gabled structure with an extension on the left side to add reinforcement on the valley side wall. The Gothic pointed portal is surmounted by a large rectangular window. The two pillars are adorned on the sides with columns topped with capitals decorated with rosettes, flowers, and palms. The capitals support lions (the one on the right has been lost) and a third one is above the portal arch. In the lunette, the remains of a fresco can be seen, of which only a few traces remain. The window above the portal does not align with the style of the facade and was presumably made more recently.

The rear facade is characterized by a triangular pediment and has two openings, the first below being long and narrow with double splaying, while the second above is small and square. Two more long and narrow windows with double splaying are found on each side of the church.

=== Interior ===
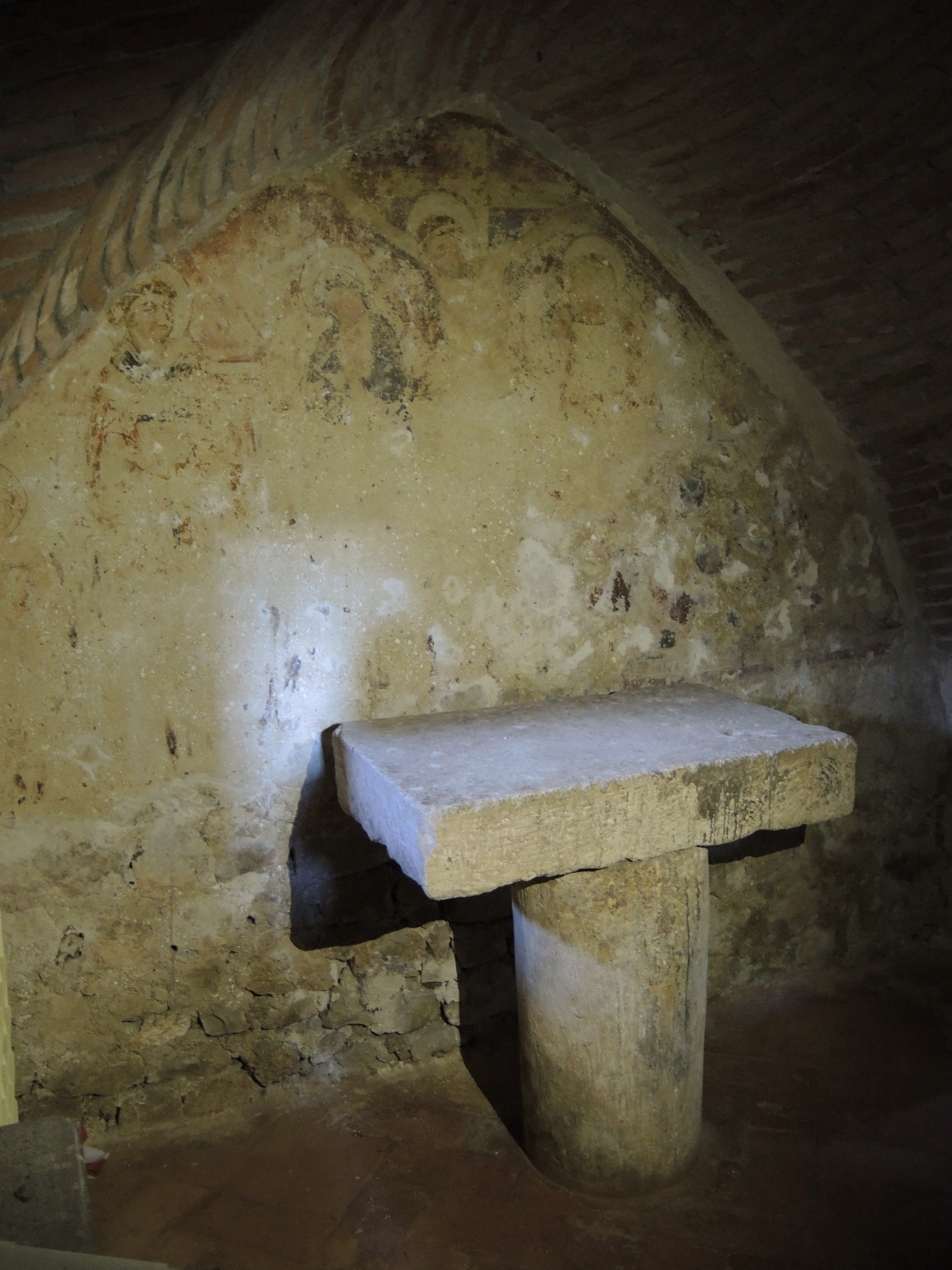
Crypt

The interior of the church in Cistercian style has a single nave with three bays. An arch separates the nave from the presbytery, which is square in shape. Raised by three steps, the apsidal area is covered by a ribbed vault with four ribs resting on as many small columns. In front of the presbytery is the staircase leading to the crypt, presumably derived from a hypogeum dedicated to the goddess Vesta. In the crypt, there is an altar made from a stone table resting on a column segment; there is a fragment of a fresco depicting the Crucifixion. The side walls are divided into three bays by pilasters; on the left wall, instead of one of the pilasters, there is a half-column, probably from the city of Aveia.

The nave's ceiling is made of wooden trusses, but it is likely that it was originally masonry. Indeed, there are hints of arches and the support pillars for the arches of a probable pointed barrel vault similar to that of the Oratory of San Pellegrino in Bominaco: it is unknown whether the vault was never completed or if it collapsed after construction.

Among the works originally housed in the church, the tempera on wood of the Madonna del Latte by Gentile da Rocca, dated 1283, is noteworthy and is one of the oldest in Abruzzo. The chapel in the center of the northern wall houses the Annunciation dated 1486 by Sebastiano di Nicola da Casentino, one of the major representatives of the Abruzzo Renaissance. Also from this church is the Madonna di Fossa, currently in the National Museum of Abruzzo.

=== The Frescoes ===
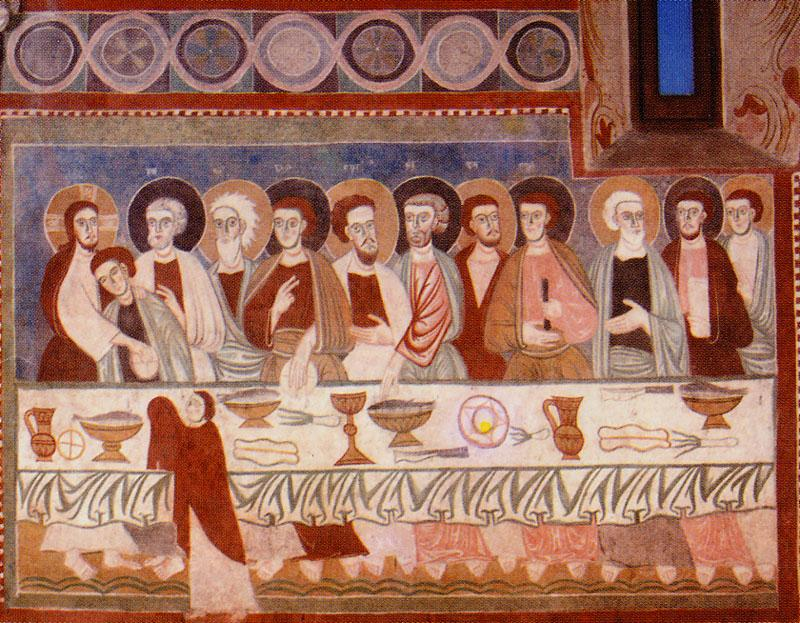
Fresco of the Last Supper (1285)

The fresco cycle belongs to the tradition of 13th-century pictorial cycles in Abruzzo, which also includes those of the Abbey Church of San Tommaso Becket in Caramanico Terme and the Church of Santa Maria di Ronzano in Castel Castagna. The cycle is dated to the last years of the 13th century, between 1264 and 1283, the year the Madonna del Latte altarpiece was created, which is preserved in the National Museum in L'Aquila. This work, attributed to Gentile da Rocca, includes these frescoes. The names of the work's patrons can be found at the bottom of the apse: Guglielmo Morelli of Sant'Eusanio (whose existence is documented in 1259), his wife, an abbot named Guido, and three young women.

This cycle covers much of the single nave of the small church, from the triumphal arch to the presbytery, the side walls, and the counter-facade. The cycle is much more varied than that of Bominaco, based on the juxtaposition of scenes from the Old and New Testaments: the primary cycle of Genesis, located on the wall of the triumphal arch, continues on the right wall. The first depiction is of God represented as a young, beardless man separating the sun from the moon. In the same panel, the Creator is centrally positioned between waves on one side and wheat sheaves on the other. The second phase of the narrative unfolds in the first bay of the right wall: the scenes are the division of Good from Evil and the Creation of Animals, then in the second register, the Creation of Adam and Eve, with the Eternal's warning against the Tree of Life on the left. The presence of God only in the first scene demonstrates the creative and original spirit of the author, as does the panel of God's warning to Adam and Eve. In the third register of Genesis, there are the Original Sin, the Expulsion from the Garden of Eden with the gate of Eden guarded by a cherub (a typical element of Abruzzese originality).

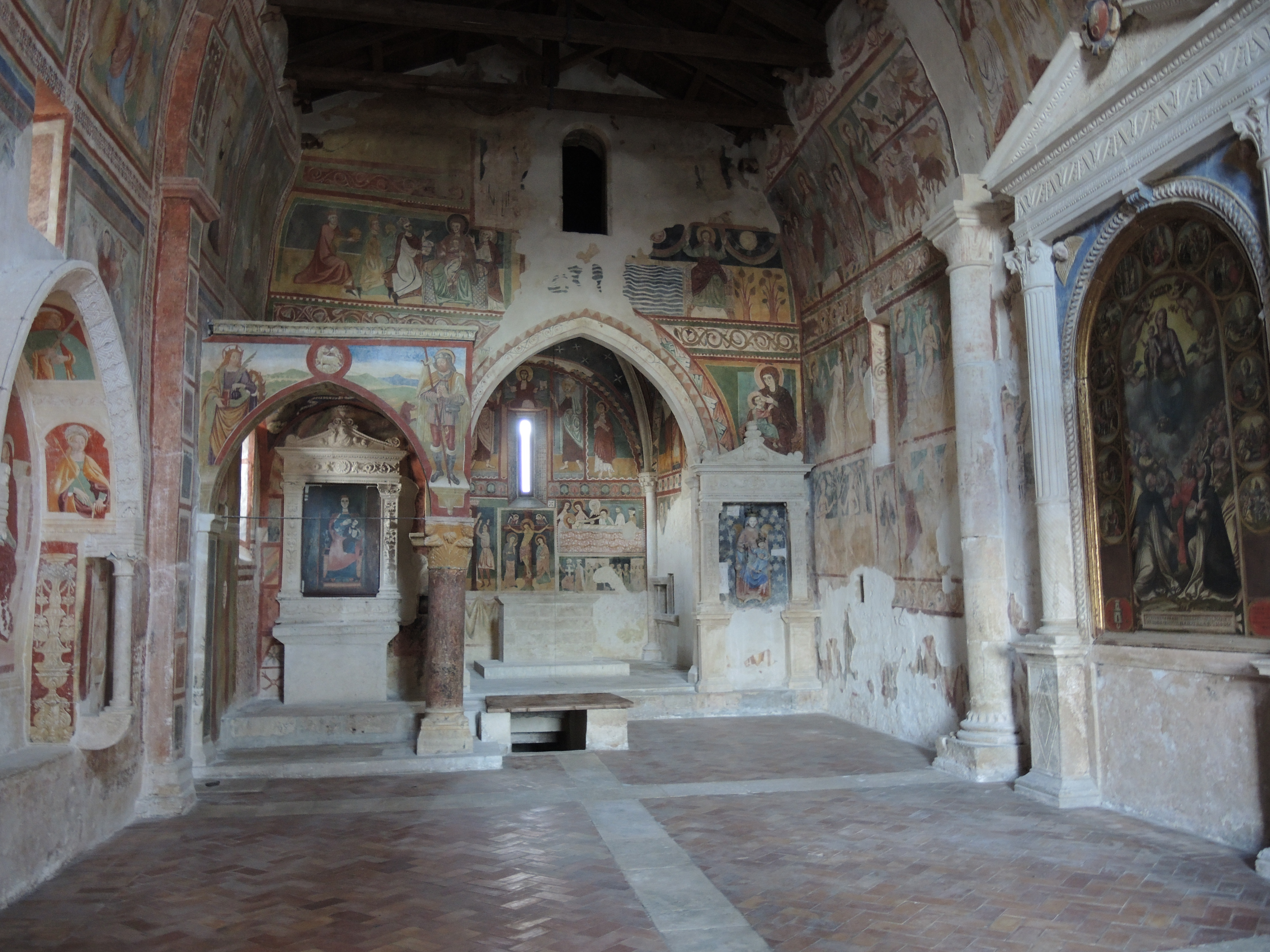
General view of the nave

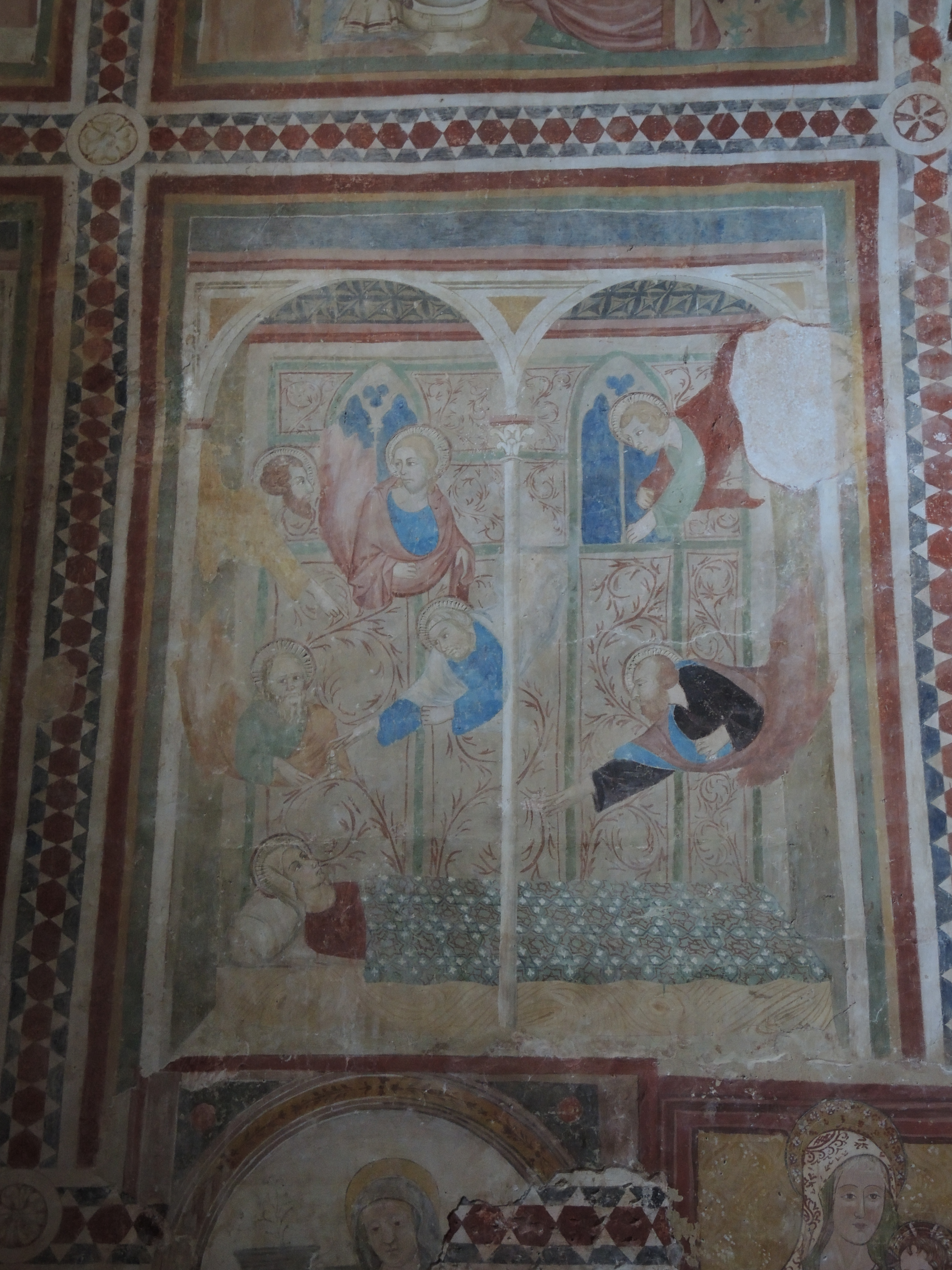
Death of the Assumption

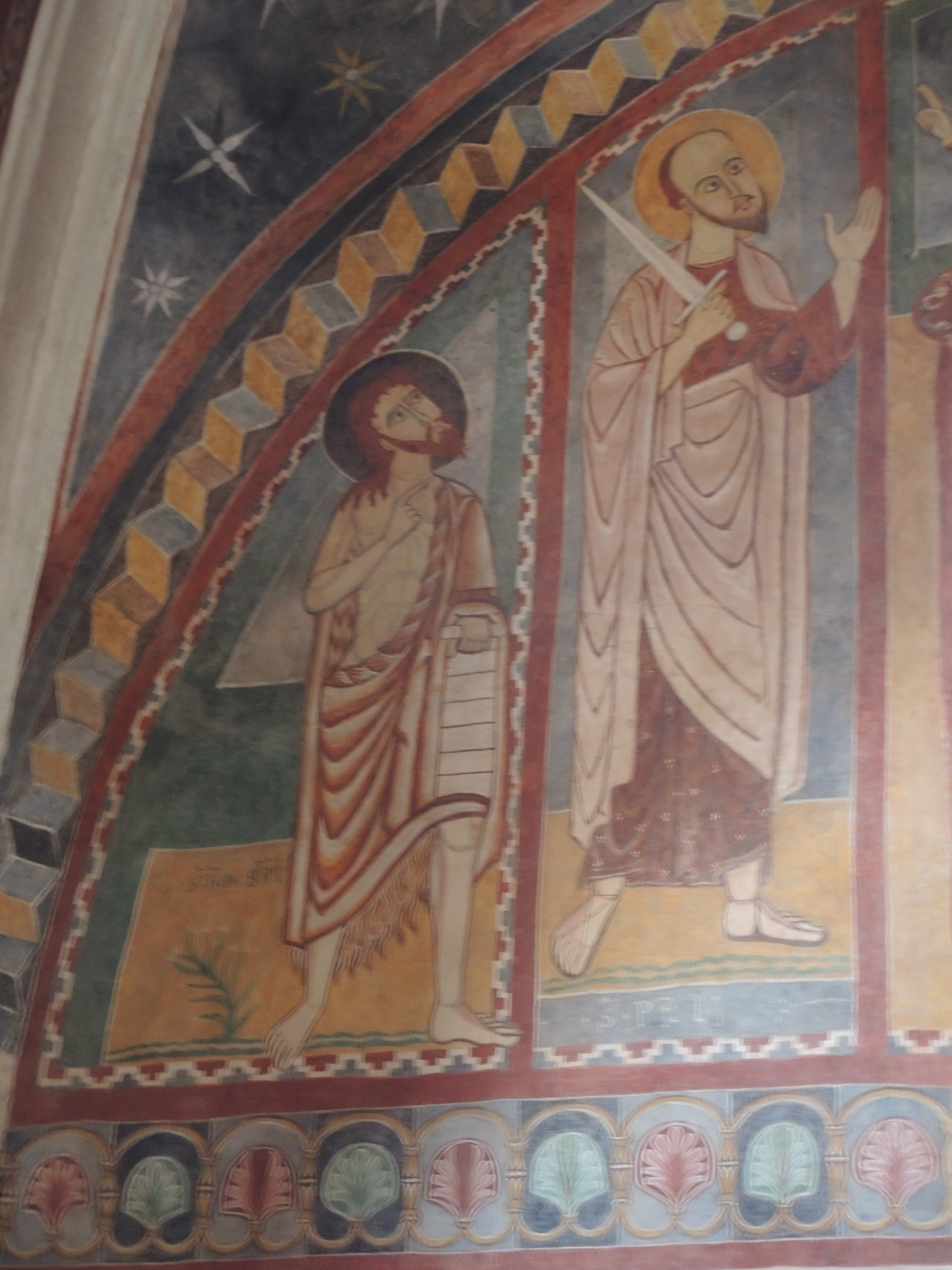
Detail of the ciborium, with Saint John the Baptist and Saint Paul the Apostle

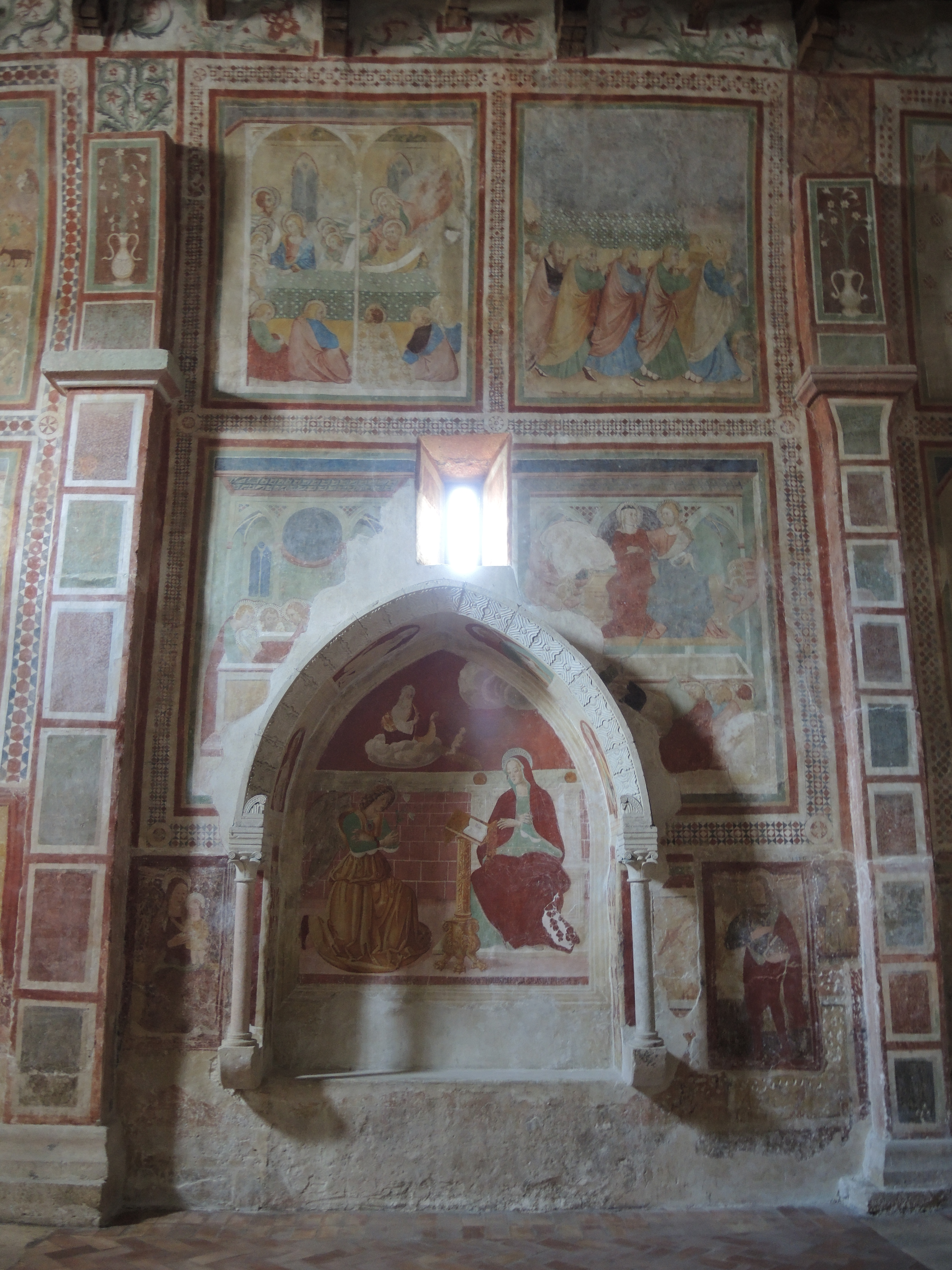
Stories of the life of Jesus and Mary, in the foreground Annunciation

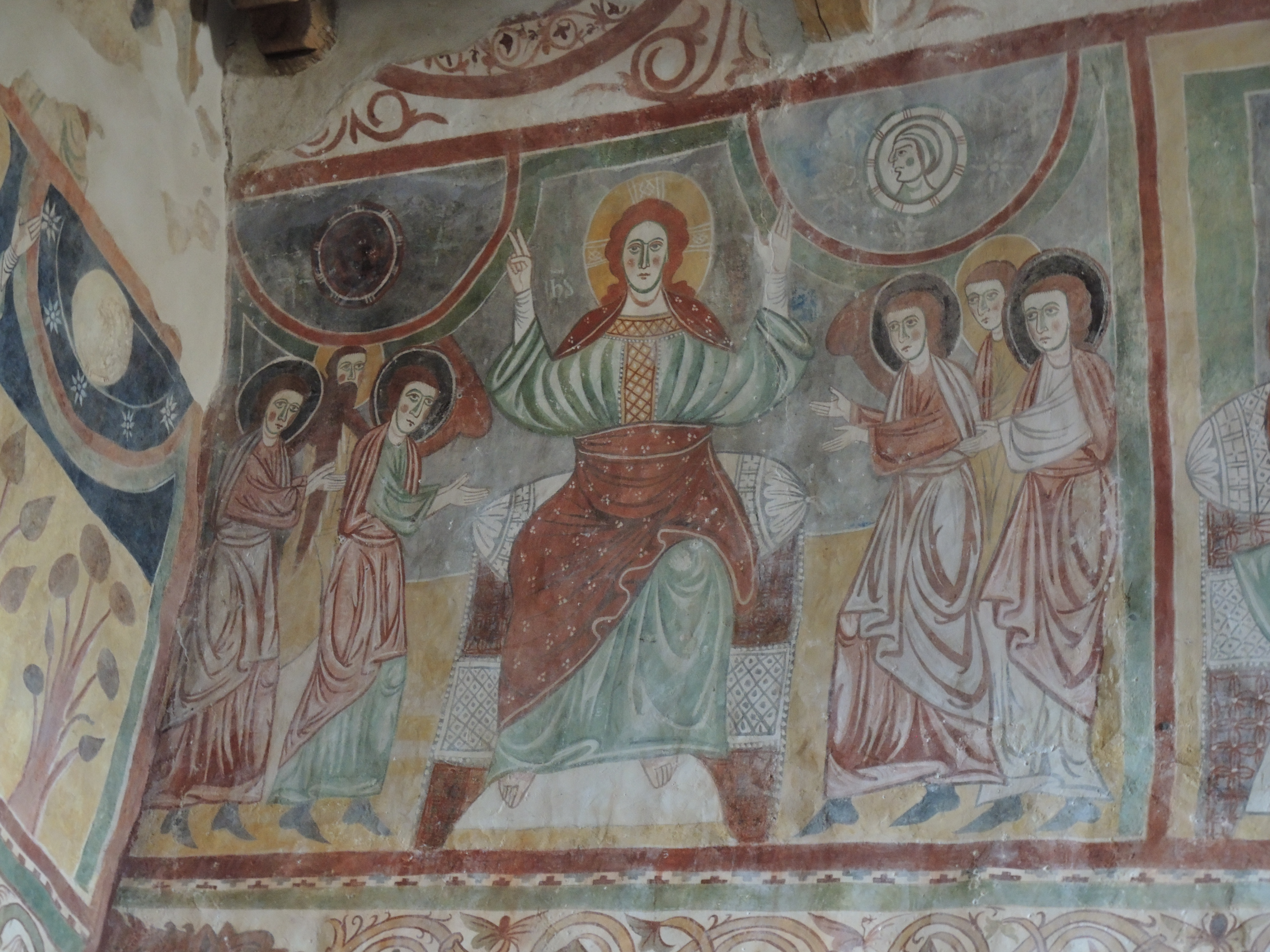
Creation of the world: Separation of light and darkness

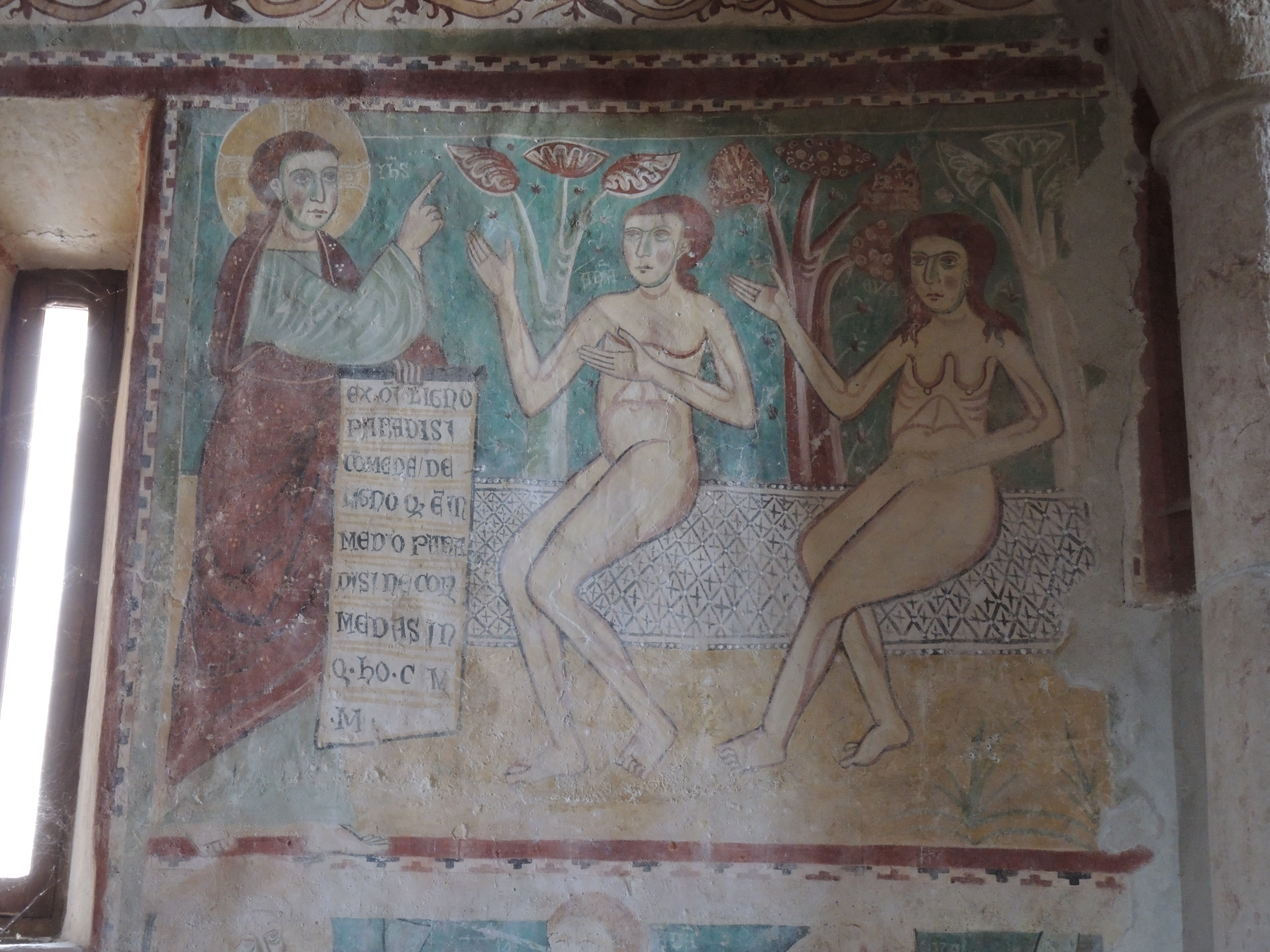
Expulsion from the Garden of Eden

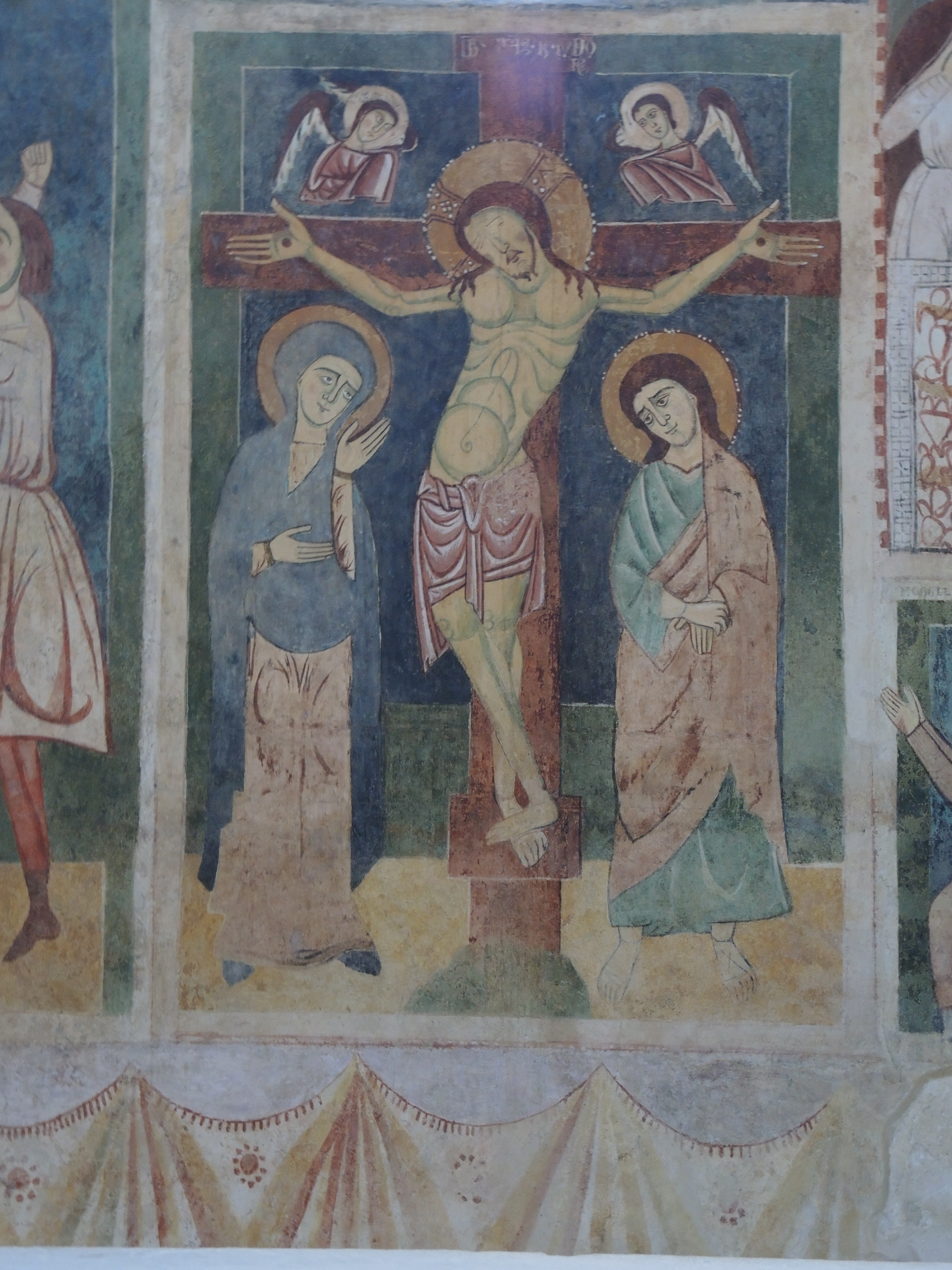
Crucifixion

The second cycle depicts characters placed in niches, holding a scroll with messages in their right hand. Based on the placement and names, some of them are Prophets, others are saints. The third bay, divided into three registers, presents two saintly knights at the top: on the left, Saint George killing the dragon, and on the right, Saint Martin removing his cloak. The patron was indeed a member of the chivalric order. The frescoes in the second register show the Allegory of the Six Final Months of the Year, represented through labor activities. In the third register are the Three Patriarchs Abraham, Isaac, and Jacob holding small figures representing the elect of Paradise. The Passion of Christ cycle is depicted in the presbytery, on the apsidal walls. On the left wall in the lunette, there are five figures with a book, and below begins the narrative of the Passion with the scenes of the Last Supper and the Kiss of Judas. Unlike in Bominaco, there is greater particularism in the rendering of faces, and Judas is portrayed separately from the Apostles. Near the lunette, separate from the scenes of the Passion, are the adult Christ Pantocrator, to the left Saint John the Baptist and Paul the Apostle, to the right Saint Peter and John the Evangelist; the second register of the Passion shows the panels of the Flagellation with a particular scene of Pontius Pilate's decision, and then the figure of the tortured Christ, followed by the scene of the Crucifixion with the Madonna and Saint John the Apostle, then the Deposition. Below this is a fresco portraying the patron with a cross-bearing shield, and next to him, characters dressed in contemporary fashion, i.e., the knight's family, named Guglielmo Amore, as the inscription reports.

The third cycle of the Last Judgment is one of the oldest in Abruzzo, occupying the counter-facade and divided into five registers. In the first at the top, there is Christ in Majesty flanked by angels with trumpets, in the second ten characters, and more recent additions from the 16th century. In the third, there are the souls of the elect and the damned. Angels bearing scrolls with the divine sentence separate the two groups.

Noteworthy is the rendering of the characters and the inclusion of monks representing Divine Justice. The fourth register depicts the Resurrection of the Dead with a row of tombs from which figures emerge, and finally, the last register, divided by the entrance portal, shows Saint Michael the Archangel weighing the souls on a scale with the Virgin beside him, and to the right the depiction of Hell with descriptions of the punishments.

These fresco cycles in Santa Maria ad Cryptas represent the great Abruzzese pictorial moment at the end of the 13th century, involving artists from Montecassino. According to Matthiae, the direction of the workshops was entrusted to one man, who worked according to Byzantine schemes, as evidenced by the paintings of the lunette of Christ and the Apostles; later other artists took their place in the workshop, depicting scenes from the Old and New Testaments. The introduction of mannerisms, sharp contours of the garments and faces, is part of the French influence of Charles of Anjou who conquered Swabian Abruzzo, as well as the well-pronounced folds of the garments, the contours of the eyes, so that these paintings conveyed spirituality and emotion to the observer, rather than the daintiness and doctrine in the Romanesque Benedictine manner.
