= Benign symmetric lipomatosis =

Rare condition of the subcutaneous fat

- Other names: Benign symmetric lipomatosis of Launois–Bensaude; Madelung's disease; multiple symmetric lipomatosis; cephalothoracic lipodystrophy; symmetrical adenolipomatosis; fat neck (Fetthals)
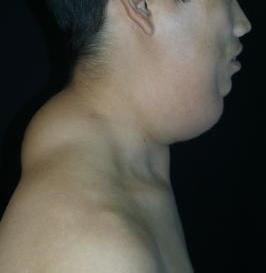
- A young man with benign symmetric lipomatosis (Madelung's disease) of unknown cause exhibiting Madelung's collar and buffalo hump
- Specialty: Dermatology, endocrinology
- Usual onset: Adult-onset

Benign symmetric lipomatosis (also known as Madelung's disease) is an adult-onset skin condition characterized by extensive symmetric fat deposits in the head, neck, and shoulder girdle area. The symmetrical fat deposits are made of unencapsulated lipomas, which distinguishes it from typical lipomatosis which has encapsulated lipomas that are not usually symmetrical. Benjamin Brodie described the condition in 1846. The German surgeon Otto Wilhelm Madelung was the first to give a detailed description of the disorder in 1888, followed by Launois and Bensaude in 1898.

== Disease ==
Madelung's disease is rare, with an estimated incidence of 1 in 25,000 in Italy. Older research found that it affects males up to 15 to 30 times more frequently than females; however, more recent studies have found a higher prevalence among women than men (1:2.5) and so further epidemiological studies are needed. It predominantly affects those of the Mediterranean and European populations, although rare cases have been documented outside of those populations (such as Ethiopian, Chinese, Mexican-American, Indian, African-American, and African-Indian).

Large fat deposits around the neck, and more rarely in the tongue, may negatively affect breathing, swallowing, and speaking. Orbital involvement is very rare, with proptosis (bulging of the eye) and persistent bilateral lumps on the eyelids.

=== Comorbidity ===
Comorbidities frequently involve the endocrine systems, with hypercholesterinemia and hypothyroidism being the most common. Other comorbidities include diabetes mellitus, hypertension, and gout. In individuals with alcohol use disorder, there is also alcohol-related cirrhosis of the liver. There have also been reports of peripheral neuropathy, ragged red fibres in muscle cells (suggesting mitochondrial myopathy), sudden cardiac death, and neurological involvement, although it is unknown whether these are due to prolonged alcohol use disorder as such symptoms of mitochondrial dysfunction also appear in alcoholics without Madelung's disease. However, rarely, instances of mitochondrial dysfunction (high lactate/low pyruvate, polyneuropathy, decreased cytochrome c oxidase and abnormal mitochondria) have been documented in non-alcoholics with Madelung's disease.

Cosmetic disfigurement due to the fat deposition in the cervicothoracic region results in a "pseudoathletic appearance," resembling the Italian statue Warrior of Capestrano and carvings of Queen of Punt (Egypt). The fat deposited around the front of the neck is known as Madelung's collar or horse collar. Fat deposited on the back of the neck between the shoulder blades is known as a dorsocervical fat pad or buffalo hump. Fat deposited in the parotid region is known as hamster cheeks.

== Cause ==
The cause of the disease remains unknown, but its incidence strongly correlates with alcohol use disorder (over 90% of cases); in such cases, abstinence from alcohol prevents disease progression. Defects in the adrenergic-stimulated lipolysis and accumulation of embryological brown fat have also been reported.

== Types ==
Earlier, the disease was classified by G. Enzi and others into two types:

- Type I: neck (Madelung's collar/horse collar), shoulders, supraclavicular triangle, and proximal upper limbs.
- Type II: abdomen and thighs.

In 1991, Donhauser classified the disease into four types, which subsequently became a commonly accepted classification:

- Type I (Madelung's collar/horse collar): neck, upper back, shoulder girdle, and upper arms.
- Type II (pseudoathletic type): shoulder girdle, deltoid region, upper arms, and thorax.
- Type III (gynecoid type): lower body, especially the thighs and medial side of the knees.
- Type IV (abdominal type): abdomen.

In 2018, a new classification was proposed, as most of the patients in the largest German study of that time did not reliably fit into the Donhauser classification system. Schiltz and others at the University Hospital Regensburg proposed the disease to be classified into five types:

- Type I (Upper body)
  - Ia: neck.
  - Ib: neck, shoulder girdle, and upper arms.
  - Ic: neck, shoulder girdle, upper arms, and trunk.
- Type II (Lower body): hips, buttocks, and thighs.
- Type III (Upper and lower body): general distribution, without involvement of head, forearms, and calves.

== Treatment ==
Traditionally the treatment is mainly surgical, consisting of the removal of the lipomas (lipectomy), although recent study has proposed liposuction and phosphatidylcholine injection as possible alternatives.

== Society ==
The appearance of people with the disease is depicted in:

- Carvings of Queen of Punt (Egypt), as noted above
- The Italian statue The Warrior of Capestrano, as noted above
- Donna Leon's crime novel, Beastly Things (2012), wherein the protagonist investigates the murder of a man who had the condition, which Brunetti learns has a high incidence in Italy

== See also ==
- Goitre
- List of skin conditions
- Madelung's deformity
