= Bernardino of Fossa =

Italian chronicler

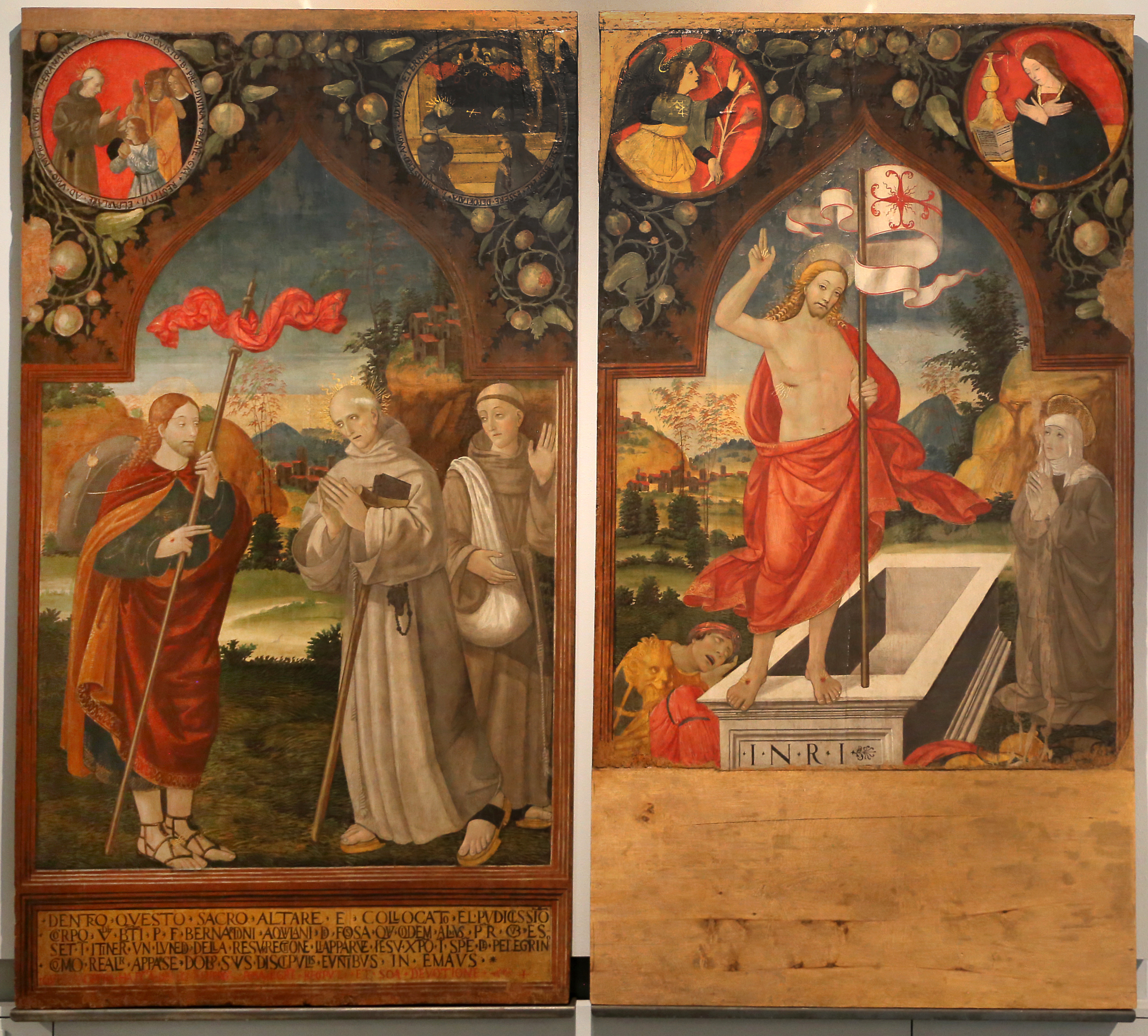
Francesco da Montereale, Apparition of Christ to the Blessed Bernardino of Fossa (left)

Bernardino of Fossa (b. at Fossa, in the Diocese of Aquila, Italy, in 1420; d. at Aquila, 27 November 1503) was an Italian Franciscan historian and ascetical writer.

== Life ==
Bernardino belonged to the Amici family, and sometimes bears the name of Aquilanus on account of his long residence and death in the town of Aquila. He received his early training at Aquila and thence went to Perugia to study canon and civil law. On 12 March 1445, he received the habit from James of the Marches who was then preaching a course of Lenten sermons at Perugia.

Bernardine was provincial of the province of St. Bernardine and of the province of Dalmatia and Bosnia, and would have been chosen Bishop of Aquila had not his humility forbidden him to accept this dignity. His cult was approved by Pope Leo XII on 26 March 1828. His feast is kept in the Franciscan Order on 7 November.

== Works ==
The writings of Bernardino include several sermons and short ascetical and historical works, including the Chronica Fratrum Minorum Observantiae. This chronicle was first edited by Leonard Lemmens from the autograph manuscript, and is prefaced by a life of Bernardino and a critical estimate of his writings. Bernardino was the author of the first life of his patron, Bernardino of Siena.
