= Aufina =

Coordinates: 42.281719°N 13.771904°E

Aufīna was an ancient city of the Vestini, mentioned by Pliny (iii. 12. s. 17), who enumerates the Aufinates Cismontani among the communities of the Vestini; and states that they were united with the Peltuinates, but whether municipally or locally, is not clear. The modern village of Ofena, about 20 km north of Popoli, in the lofty and rugged group of mountains north of the Aternus (modern Aterno), retains the ancient site as well as name. It was a bishop's see as late as the 6th century, and numerous antiquities have been found there. (Holsten. Not. in Cluver. p. 140; Romanelli, vol. iii. p. 271.)
