= Otto Wilhelm Madelung =

German surgeon (1846–1926)

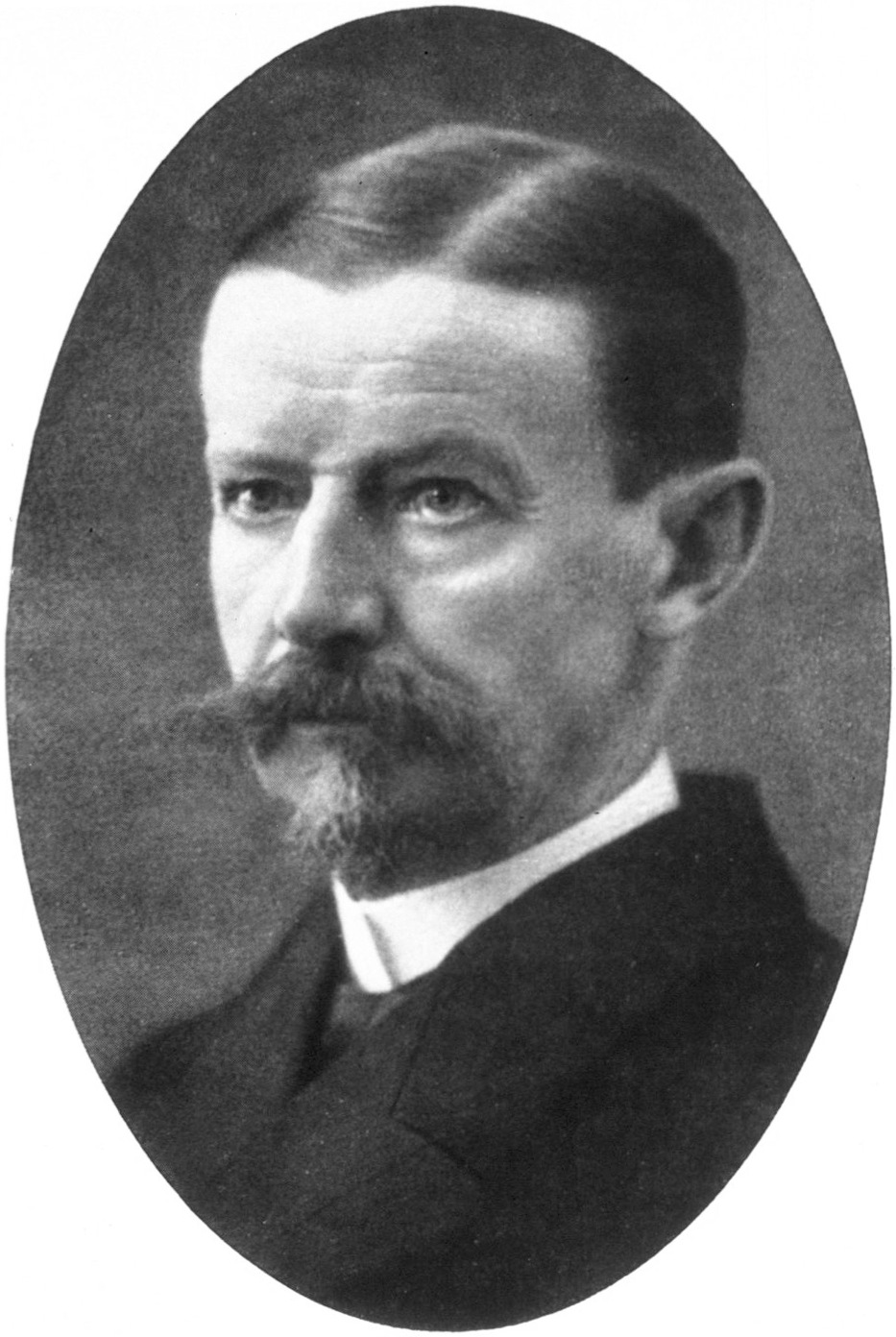
Otto Wilhelm Madelung

Otto Wilhelm Madelung (May 15, 1846 – July 22, 1926) was a German surgeon who was a native of Gotha. His son, physicist Erwin Madelung (1881–1972), discovered the Madelung constant.

== Academic career ==
Madelung was born in Gotha. In 1869 he received his medical doctorate from the University of Tübingen, afterwards being assigned to a military hospital during the Franco-Prussian War. He later served as a surgical assistant in Bonn, and in 1873–74 worked as an assistant at the pathological clinic of Georg Eduard von Rindfleisch (1836–1908).

In 1874 he visited Great Britain and the United States. In 1881 he became an assistant professor of surgery at the University of Bonn, followed by professorships at Rostock (from 1882) and Strasbourg (from 1894). After the French takeover of Strasbourg following World War I, Madelung was relieved of his duties, and he subsequently retired to Göttingen, where he died.

== Contributions in medicine ==
Otto Madelung is remembered for his work with an orthopedic disorder known as Madelung's deformity, defined as a progressive curvature of the radius bone in the forearm. The condition was earlier mentioned by Guillaume Dupuytren in 1834, Auguste Nélaton in 1847, and Joseph-François Malgaigne in 1855, however Madelung was the first physician to provide a comprehensive, clinical description.

Madelung also described a benign form of lipomatosis, characterized by symmetrical deposits of adipose tissue in the area of the neck, shoulder girdle, arms, and upper trunk of the body. Today, this disorder goes by several names, including "benign symmetric lipomatosis", "Madelung's syndrome", and "multiple symmetric lipomatosis". If the condition is confined to the neck, it is sometimes referred to by the eponym "Madelung's neck".

Madelung specialized in abdominal surgery, and is known for his pioneer work with intestinal anastomoses and laparotomy.

== Written works ==
- Die spontane Subluxation der Hand nach Vorne. Verhandlungen der deutschen Gesellschaft für Chirurgie, Berlin, 1878; 7: 259–276. Madelung's deformity explained.
- Zur Erleichterung der Sehnennaht. Centralblatt für Chirurgie, Leipzig, 1882.
- Das Stadt-Krankenhaus in Rostock. In: Julius Uffelmann (1837–1894): Hygienische Topographie der Stadt Rostock. Rostock, 1889.

== Sources ==
- Seyed Behrooz Mostofi (2004). Who's who in orthopedics. Springer. ISBN 1-85233-786-9.
- Article on Madelung's Disease
- "Otto Wilhelm Madelung". Who Named It. Archived from the original on February 28, 2002.
