= Fossa, Abruzzo =

Fossa
- Comune
- Comune di Fossa
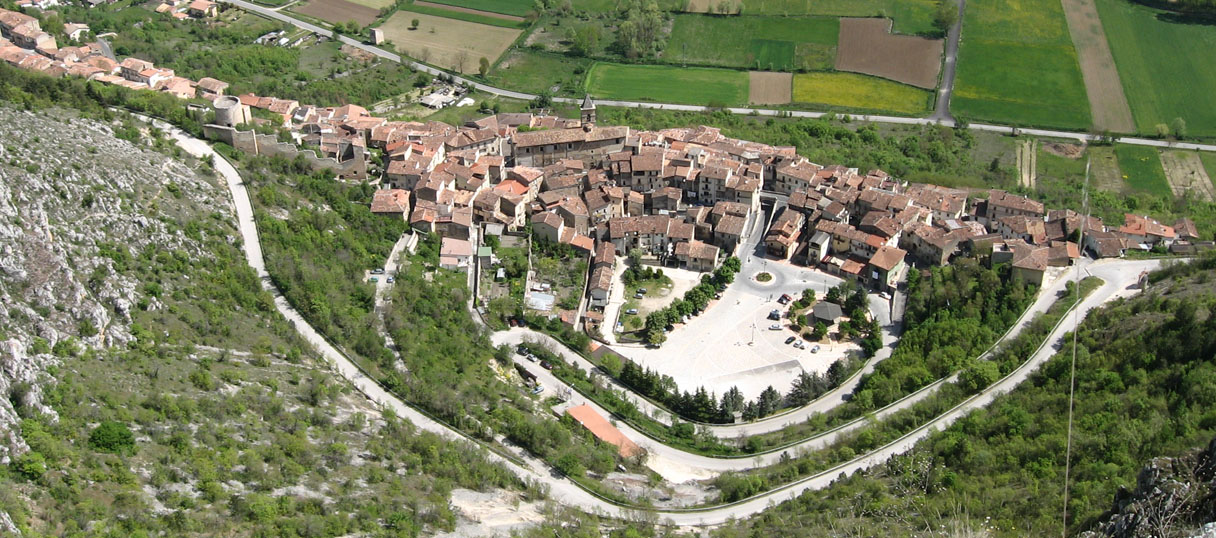

- Coat of arms

- Location within Italy Location within Abruzzo
- Coordinates: 42°18′N 13°29′E
- Country: Italy
- Region: Abruzzo
- Province: L'Aquila (AQ)
- Frazioni: Cerro, Le Chiuse, Osteria

Government
  - Mayor: Fabrizio Boccabella (Fossa Bene Comune)

Area
  - Total: 8 km^{2} (3.1 sq mi)
- Elevation: 644 m (2,113 ft)

Population (31 December 2010)
  - Total: 704
  - Density: 88/km^{2} (230/sq mi)
- Demonym: Fossani
- Time zone: UTC+1 (CET)
  - Summer (DST): UTC+2 (CEST)
- Postal code: 67020
- Dialing code: 0862
- Website: Official website

Fossa (formerly Aveia) is a comune and town in the province of L'Aquila in the Abruzzo region of southern Italy. Bernardino of Fossa was born in the town. The 2009 L'Aquila earthquake contributed to the collapse of a bridge in Fossa, and caused extensive damage to the residential buildings in the town. The town was the epicentre of a major aftershock 5.4 Mw on April 7, 2009.

== History ==
The first traces of human presence in the area in pre-Roman times date back to the Vestini, with the remains of fortifications on Mount Cerro and the necropolis from the 9th century BC.

Roman times witnessed the development of Aveia, a city that was a part of the prefecture and Roman municipality of the Augustan IV region (Samnium et Sabina) until the Third Samnite War, only for it to be incorporated within Rome after the Battle of Sentinum in 295 BC on par with Peltuinum and Amiternum.

The floods that procured the swamping of the countryside below present-day Fossa and the perching of the village on the mountain for defensive needs following the barbarian invasions caused the new medieval village to be superimposed on the ancient Roman city, to which it supplied much of the building material, as evidenced by the many artifacts visible in the new buildings.

The original settlement of Fossa dates from the early 12th century and consisted essentially of the keep on the summit and the dwellings contained in the fortified enclosure. Around the same time, the Castle of Fossa was built. The first mentions of the new nucleus of Fossa date back to this period, with the first document consisting of a Papal Bull of 1204 that includes the town to the Diocese Forconese and another document of 1269 that testifies to the town's participation in the founding of the city of L'Aquila. Initially it was a fief of the Berardi and Fossa families (who derived their name from it) and later of the Colonna and Barberini families.

Expansion of the hamlet began in the late 13th century along the ridge of the karst sinkhole itself with a concentric settlement around the fortified enclosure. The castle's efficiency lasted through the 16th century, overtaken then by the invention of firearms and the development of trade that broke the closed medieval economy. In a second phase the village developed along the main road set above the slope of the mountain.

On 6 April 2009 at 3:32 am, the town was impacted by the L'Aquila earthquake, which resulted in the collapse of a bridge and severe damage to most of the residential buildings in the town. There was an aftershock happening on the following day with its epicenter located in Fossa. Those events led to the town being largely abandoned.

Reconstruction of the severely damaged town began as early as May 2011, but the process was slow, partially due to the refusal of foreign aid by the Italian government under then-Prime Minister Silvio Berlusconi and due to bureaucratic hurdles. Until 2019, the town remained largely abandoned, with reconstruction still progressing on a slow pace, although some buildings were already being restored.

On 28 April 2019, the church Santa Maria ad Cryptas was reopened for worship, almost a decade after the disaster. As of June 2024, reconstruction is still ongoing, with many of Fossa's residents returning to their former homes, which by then had been fully rebuilt.

By 2026, more people started returning to their houses and the building cranes that once dominated the landscape started to disappear. By March 2026, reconstruction work was largely completed (with a few exceptions like Castello di Fossa) and reconstruction teams started focusing on preserving the town's ancient sidewalk tiles, called Ciottolato.

== Main sights ==
- Castle
- Santa Maria ad Cryptas
- Santa Maria Assunta, the parish church of Fossa, situated in Piazza Belvedere
- Necropolis of Fossa
- Palazzo Bonanni, the former seat of the local government, now a museum of local artisan crafts

== Transport ==
Fossa has a stop on the Terni–Sulmona railway, with trains to L'Aquila and Sulmona.
