= Castle of Fossa =

Middle Ages castle in Abruzzo, Italy

- Castello di Fossa
- Fossa
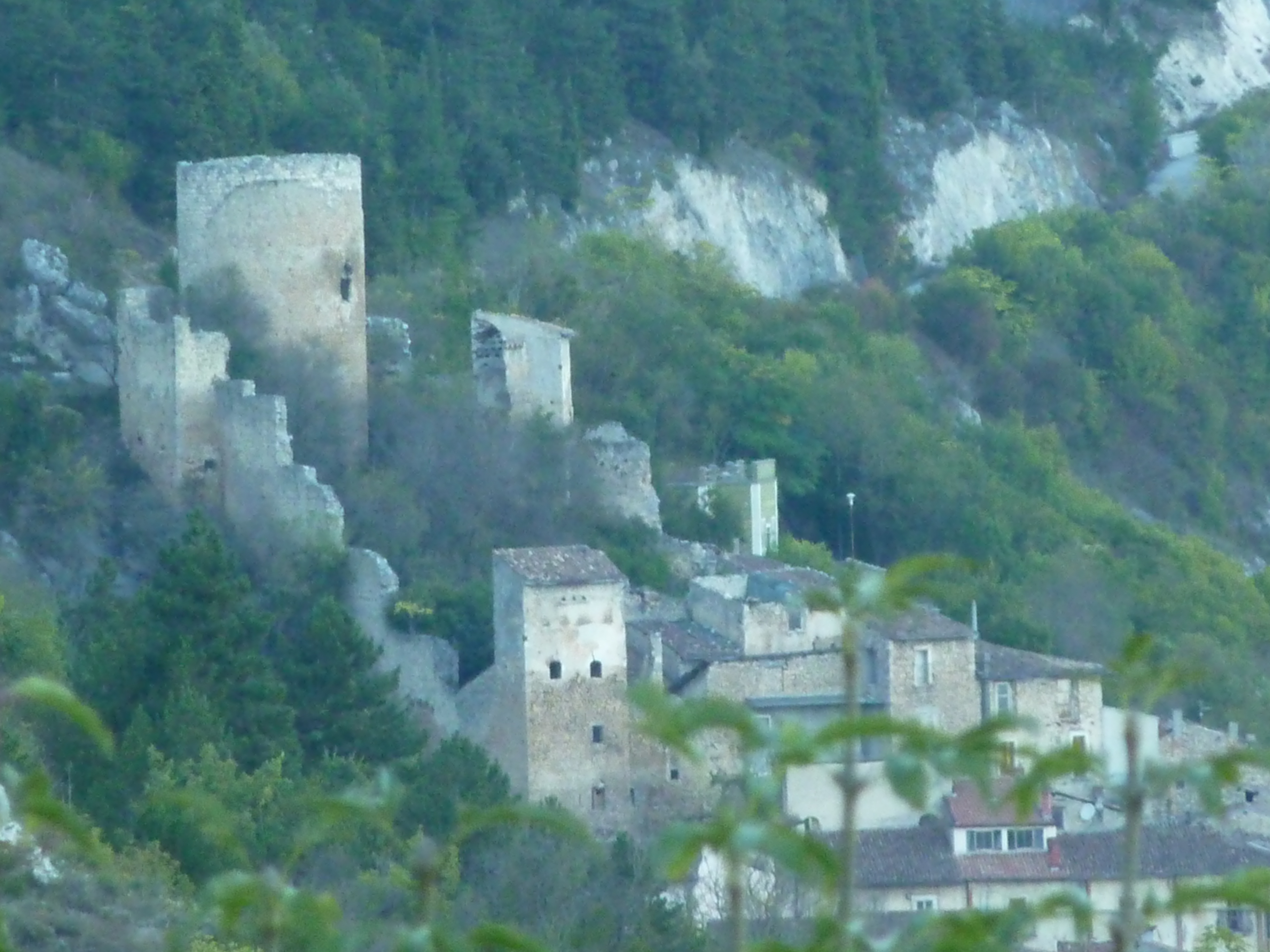
- Castle in Fossa

Site information
- Type: Castle
- Open to the public: No

Location
- Coordinates: 42.293053°N 13.486894°E

Site history
- Built: 12th century

The Castle of Fossa (Italian: Castello di Fossa) is a Middle Ages castle in Fossa, province of L'Aquila, Abruzzo, southern Italy.

== History ==
The castle of Fossa is the typical result of the phenomena of encastellation that occurred in medieval times. It is located in the highest part of the village, on the eastern side of the Circolo mountain.

The original structure dates back to the early 12th century and was made by the keep on the top and the fortified trapezoidal enclosure containing the first houses. The development of the village then took place outside the fence of the castle. This enclosure castle typology was quite common in the area, as seen with similar structures in San Pio delle Camere, Barisciano or Bominaco.

== Architecture ==
The highest point of the castle consists of a circular tower, from which the walls depart delimiting the trapezoidal enclosure, surrounded by four square towers. The tower probably dates back to the 12th or 13th century, while the rest of the building probably dates to the late 13th or early 14th century.

The height of the walls was between 8 and 10 meters, with a thickness of over a meter and a chemin de ronde to their summits. Two towers were located at the bottom corners of the fence and were also used as houses. Another tower is located on the north wall and the fourth one side is to the east, flanked to the southeast one.

The main access to the enclosure is located on the north-east wall, and it consists of a door with a pointed arch in stone. A secondary entrance is near the southwest tower.

The height of the main tower is 17 meters and its width diameter of 8 meters. It had no doors and it was accessed by a staircase that was stored inside of the building. A drawbridge connected the tower with the chemin de ronde on the walls.
