= San Silvestro, L'Aquila =

Church building in L'Aquila, Italy

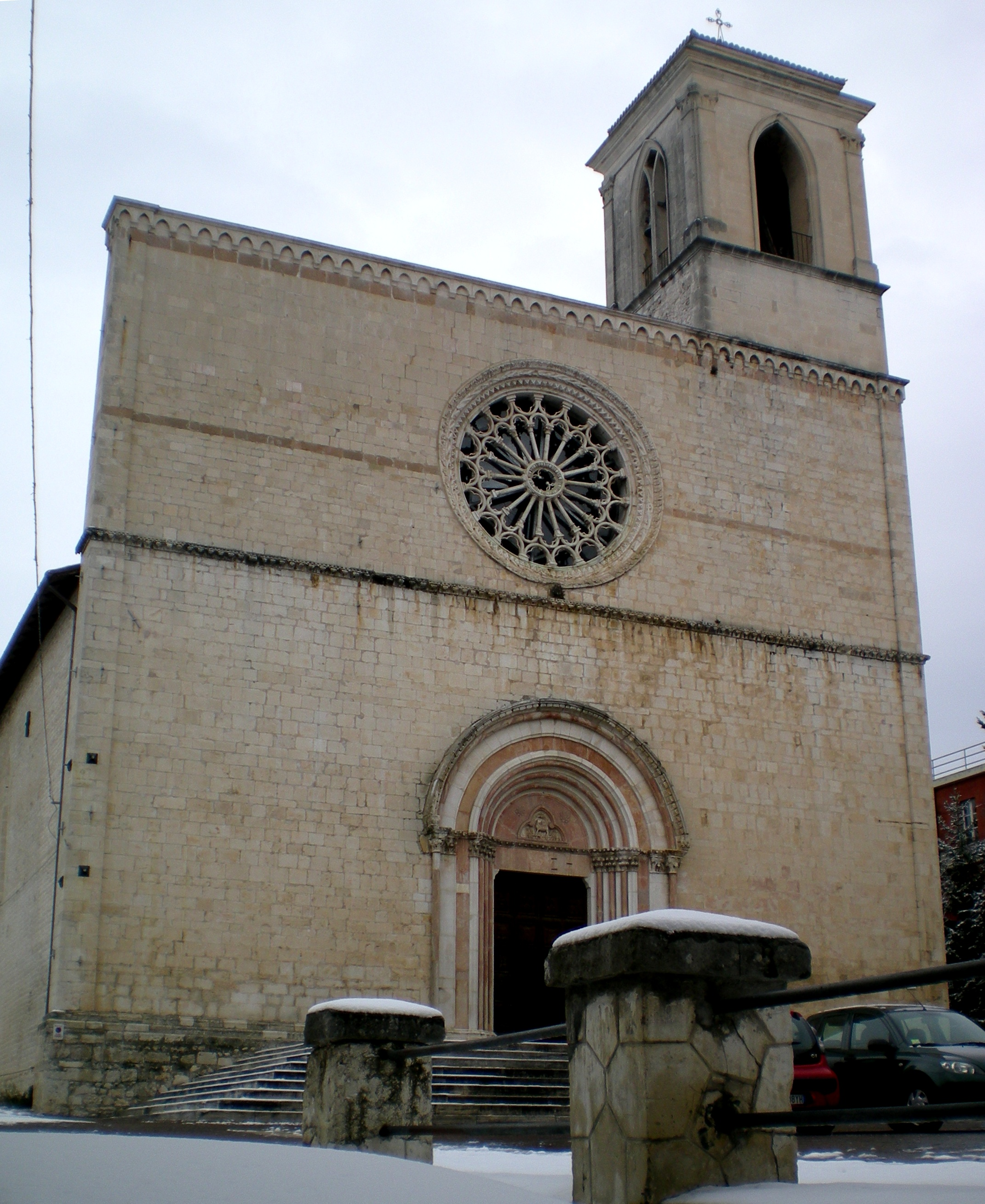
Church of San Silvestro in L'Aquila.

San Silvestro is a Gothic-style, Roman Catholic, former church in the town of L'Aquila, in the region of Abruzzo, Italy. The church is presently under restoration after the 2009 earthquake.

== History ==
The church was built between the 13th and 14th centuries by the locals of the Castello di Collebrincioni. Documents attest to its existence by 1350. It suffered damage and reconstruction with the 1461 earthquake. A 1967-1969 refurbishment restored the church to a medieval appearance.

The white marble façade and the presbytery date to 1350 or later (after the 1349 earthquake), but other elements of the structure are older. The main portal appears to date to an earlier time. Much of the internal decoration and chapels were added after the 1461 earthquake. The layout is that of a Romanesque basilica with three naves ending in polygonal arches. The nave arches are ogival. The nave roof is made of wood. The façade has a large gothic rose window. The bell-tower was added in the 19th century.

The Branconio chapel once held an altarpiece depicting the Visitation (1520) by Raphael. The work is now in the Museo del Prado of Madrid, stolen in 1655. Today an anonymous copy takes its place.

Near the entrance is an early 16th-century fresco by Francesco da Montereale, depicting the Enthroned Madonna and Child. The church has other 14th and 15th-century frescoes.
