= Shesmetet =

Ancient Egyptian deity

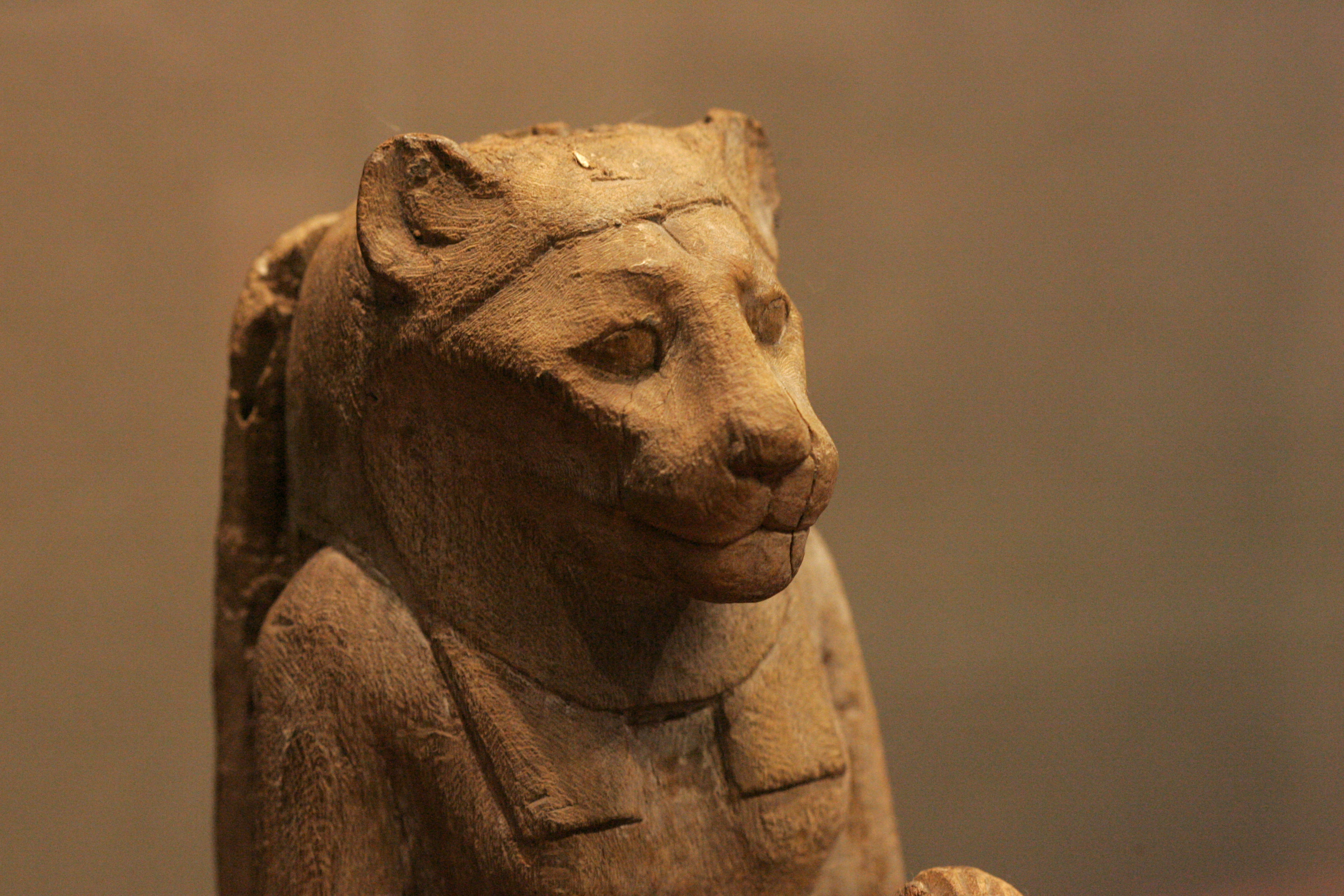
Name in hieroglyphs
S z S17A t t

Shesmetet (šsm.t.t) is an ancient Egyptian goddess. She was mentioned in the Pyramid Texts and was usually referred to as the deceased's mother. She was depicted as a lion or a woman with a lion's head, and thus was sometimes considered a form of Sekhmet or Bastet, but one of her epithets – "Lady of Punt" – differentiates her from them and may refer to a possible African origin. Her name comes from shesmet, a sash decorated with beads, which appears on the depictions of Old Kingdom rulers and the god Sopdu.
