= Francesco da Montereale =

Italian painter

Francesco da Montereale (1476-1541) was an Italian painter of the early-Renaissance period, active in L'Aquila, region of Abruzzo.

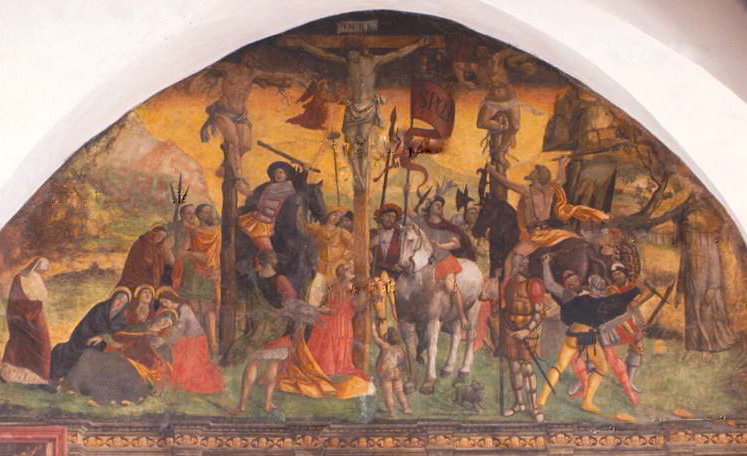
Crucifixion, fresco at the church of the Beata Antonia, L'Aquila

== Biography ==
He was the son of the painter, Paolo da Montereale. Francesco's son, Pier Francesco was also a painter. He is described as a follower of Pietro Perugino. He painted a fresco of the Virgin and a Bishop and a Resurrection (now lost) for Santa Maria del Soccorso in L'Aquila. He also painted an Assumption for the church of San Quinziano. he also painted frescoes depicting a Risen Christ in a chapel at San Domenico. His masterworks are considered the Baptism of Emperor Constantine and Virgin and Child with Angels and Saints Sebastian and Roch for the church of San Silvestro, L'Aquila.
