= Warrior of Capestrano =

6th-century BC statue

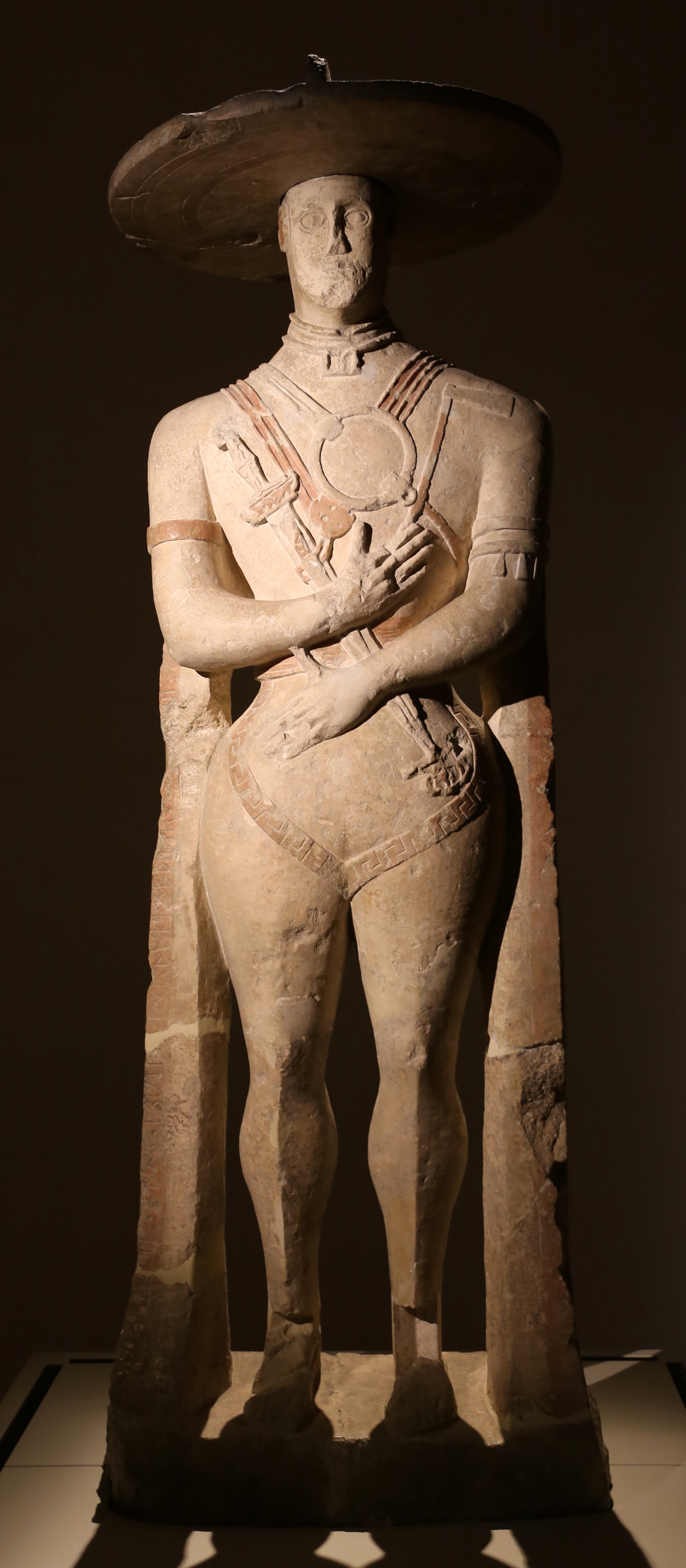
- Material: Limestone
- Height: approx. 2.5 m (8.2 ft)
- Created: c. 550 BC
- Discovered: September 1934; Capestrano, Abruzzo, Italy
- Present location: Chieti, Abruzzo, Italy

The Warrior of Capestrano is a tall limestone statue of a Picene warrior, dated to around the 6th century BC. The statue was found in the territory of the Vestini, but depicts a man with a Picene helmet.

Excavations at the site were prompted after a labourer in 1934 accidentally stumbled across a stone artifact while ploughing the fields by the town of Capestrano, Italy. Subsequent archaeological investigation conducted by the Italian archaeologist Giuseppe Moretti discovered the remains of a necropolis and the Warrior of Capestrano figure.

== Description ==
Though itself only 1.7 metres (5.6 ft) tall, the Warrior of Capestrano rises up to 2.5 metres (8.2 ft) whilst atop its base. The figure is composed of a type of soft limestone prevalent throughout Abruzzo known as "soft stone ("pietra gentile")." Two separate blocks of stone were used to form the statue, one of which was reshaped into the body, whereas the other was used to create the headpiece. Due to the soft character of the limestone, there remain marks left by the original stonemason, who likely employed tools such as a flat chisel, toothed chisel, scratch awl, or a gauge. To finish the sculpture, the original artisan perhaps utilized a combination of a soft cloth and sand. The statue stands framed laterally by two pillars, which were themselves engraved with spears. These depictions may represent an early Italic funerary practice wherein the deceased was held upright by spears under their armpits. There were also remnants of red ochre found on the statue, which was possibly used to emphasize certain aspects of the face, such as the ears, or to highlight the edges of the various pieces of weapons and armor. The nuances of the design reflect meticulous craftsmanship, indicating that the creator was most likely a competent and experienced worker.

Given that the limestone was sourced from the Gran Sasso region, and that the armor and clothing adorning the statue are largely consistent with the known warrior outfit of ancient Central Italy, it is likely that the figure is of native Italic production. Nevertheless, the statue is unique amongst known Italic sculpture—there are few comparable examples of monumental sculpture from prehistoric Italy, though another similar statue of a female figure—perhaps the wife of the warrior statuette—was uncovered at the original site where archaeologists discovered the Capestrano Warrior. It is possible that, stylistically, the Capestrano figure drew from the kouros tradition of Greek sculpture, in which case the Hellenic influence perhaps arrived via trade routes with Southern Italy. Alternatively, the statue has been explained as the result of Etruscan influence. There are other types of monumental sculpture likely influenced by the Greek kouros style that have been uncovered in other areas of Western Europe, all in burial contexts, perhaps indicating that the Capestrano Warrior was likewise a funerary item.

The pose of the statue is comparable to similar poses exemplified by the Hirschlanden statue or the Glauberg prince, both of which portray male warriors with a raised right arm and an extended thumb. The reversed form of the gesture, a variant with the left arm raised upwards instead of the right, also appears across Europe, though it is most often associated with female figures, including the female bust uncovered near the Warrior of Capestrano statue. According to the archaeologist Alexandra Ghenghea, if the statue was artistically influenced by Ancient Greek culture, it is possible that it may also have borrowed from certain concepts in Hellenic philosophy, in particular the perception of the right-side as more positive and the left as more negative.

It is not entirely clear whether the statue represents a male or female figure: It lacks breasts and is portrayed with a masculine body fat distribution across the upper-body, yet it is portrayed more feminine waist-hip ratio. It is possible that the figure wears a loincloth concealing any genitalia, though it is marked by an incision by the pelvis suggestive of female sex organs. The majority opinion amongst scholars is that the figure is masculine, though—according to the archaeologist Ruth D. Whitehouse—the unclear gender may be intentional, and the statue may portray a character from myth, where sex changes or combinations are common. However, Bonfante argues that the absence of male genitalia is possibly attributable to the loincloth covering the region, as other statues adorned with a similar garment also lack explicit male genitals. Furthermore, wide hips, though feminine in some societies, were not necessarily conceptualized as feminine within specifically the culture that produced the Capestrano warrior figurine. In ancient Greek society, for instance, large thighs were associated with strength and virility. By this same principle, the large hips of the Capestrano figurine could have in fact served to reinforce a characterization an ideal masculine warrior. The unusual shape of the statue has also been compared to that of patients afflicted with Madelung's disease, which is associated with asymmetric deposits of fat across the body and is more prevalent in the Mediterranean region.

=== Weapons and armor ===
The statue is adorned with various pieces of weapons and armor, including a kardiophylax and a loincloth that extends from the top of the buttocks through the legs and over the groin. The discs of the kardiophylax are smooth and lack any evidence of decoration, though it is not possible to determine whether they were once painted. There are, however, traces of red paint on the loincloth and one of the right armbands. Another of the two right armbands is ornamented with trapezoidal shapes, whereas the band encircling the neck is attached to a rectangular pendant. Due to the presence of a line drawn around the face, it has also been suggested that the figure may wear a mask, perhaps a death mask. Otherwise, however, the face displays generally normal proportions.

Most of the gear adorning the statue has clear parallels in the archaeological record of the surrounding region, though certain elements of its attire are unusual. In particular, the helmet seemingly lacks any genuine protective value, and more is more probably an example of artistic conceit rather than a realistic depiction of a warrior's headgear. There are other examples of similar hats in Etruscan art, such as the Etruscan statuettes from Murlo. Furthermore, the statue is wearing a unique type of sandal with metal blades or nails fixed to the soles. The exact function of this footwear is unknown, though the archaeologist Larissa Bonfante suggests that they may have served to elevate the statue, thereby projecting a more grandiose image.

In addition to armor pieces, the figure also carries various weapons, such as a 70–75 centimetres (28–30 in) short sword with a 10 centimetres (3.9 in) hilt. The sword was decorated with multiple images of different subjects, one of which—located on the grip—portrayed two humans, whereas the other—located on the cross-guard showcases two animals, perhaps horses. It is possible that there were other decorations on the pommel, though it has been damaged over time, rendering any definitive conclusion impossible. Furthermore, the figure holds either a knife or a whetstone close to the sword's scabbard and, in its right hand, it wields an axe. Based on comparisons between the equipment of the Capestrano Warrior and examples of similar accoutrements uncovered throughout Central Italy, the artifact has been dated to the 6th-century BCE. Chronologically, the axe carried by the statue is somewhat out-of-place, as axes, when present in the archaeological record of this region, usually belong to earlier periods. Axes are also generally uncommon throughout Iron Age burials in Central Italy, and their limited appearances are often associated with high-status graves, perhaps indicating that the weapon maintained a type of symbolic or special significance within the local culture.

== Inscription ==
There is an inscription in South Picene accompanying the statue, which perhaps identifies the figure as representing a king or, more generally, some type of prominent individual. Analysis of the letterforms suggests that they date to the second half of the 6th-century BCE and belong to a Central Italian variant of the Etruscan alphabet, with additional influence from the Corinthian script. The text of the inscription reads,

makupríkoramopsút[an]inisrakinevíi[p]om[p ]i

It is perhaps to be segmented as,

ma kupri koram opsut aninis rakinelis [p]om[p ]i

One translation renders the text as,

"this beautiful statue was made by Aninis for king Po(m)ponius."

However, the archaeologists Eleanor Betts presents an alternative translation:

"this statue was made for Cupra by Aninis Rakinelis of the Po(m)ponii."

== Archaeology ==
The first signs of artifacts at the site were uncovered at the Tirino River Valley in 1934 by a worker ploughing fields near the town of Capestrano. According to Italian archaeologist Moretti—who first excavated the site—the original labourer slowly uncovered other human-shaped objects as he worked around the site. Nevertheless, he did not initially consider this discovery to be particularly meaningful, even when he had unearthed remains of a female bust underneath a helmet. Eventually, the discovery of this female torso and the circular stone helmet convinced researchers to further explore the site. The figure of the Capestrano Warrior was discovered by Moretti nearby the site of the original torso and helmet. Initially, it was broken above the knees, though some of the missing fragments were found during later exploration at the site. The female bust was likewise damaged; it lacked its head and was broken above the belt, though no additional pieces were ever recovered for this statuette. During the excavations conducted by Moretti, two lithic bases, 28 burials (dating between the 7th-6th centuries BCE), and five cremation burials (dating to the Roman Republican period) were uncovered. The site continued to draw interest from archaeologists, who have since excavated around 350 graves at the cemetery.

== See also ==
- Media related to Guerriero di Capestrano at Wikimedia Commons
