= Ofena =

- Comune
- Comune di Ofena
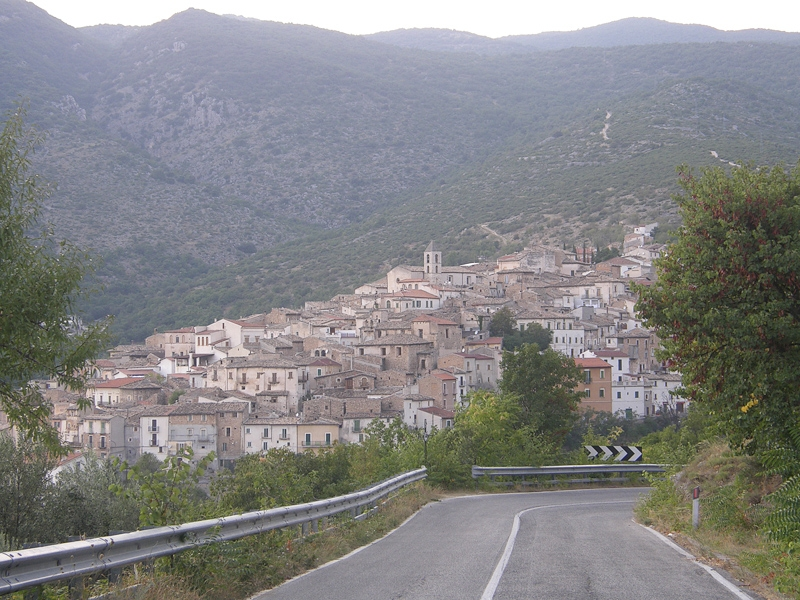

- Location within Italy Location within Abruzzo
- Coordinates: 42°19′36″N 13°45′35″E
- Country: Italy
- Region: Abruzzo
- Province: L'Aquila (AQ)
- Frazioni: Cappuccini, Frasca, Volpe

Government
  - Mayor: Antonio Silveri (Civic list Uniti per Ofena)

Area
  - Total: 36.72 km^{2} (14.18 sq mi)
- Elevation: 531 m (1,742 ft)

Population (1 January 2017)
  - Total: 492
  - Density: 13.4/km^{2} (34.7/sq mi)
- Demonym: Ofenesi
- Time zone: UTC+1 (CET)
  - Summer (DST): UTC+2 (CEST)
- Postal code: 67025
- Dialing code: 0862
- ISTAT code: 066060
- Saint day: 8 May

Ofena (Abruzzese: Ofenë) is a comune and town in the Province of L'Aquila in the Abruzzo region of Italy. It is located in the natural park known as the "Gran Sasso e Monti della Laga National Park". The comune/village is home to a vast and rich history of a community that has existed for many hundreds of years.

== History ==
A letter of Pope Simplicius dated 19 November 475 speaks of a Bishop Gaudentius of Aufinium, the Latin name by which the town was known, against whom three neighbouring bishops had laid complaints.

No longer a residential bishopric, Aufinium is today listed by the Catholic Church as a titular see.

== Sports ==
In the southern part of the city of Ofena is the Campo Sportivo Comunale di Ofena, a public football field.

== Administration ==
The following are the mayors of Ofena since 1998.

Period		Mayor	Party	Notes
4 July 1988	7 June 1993	Bruno Gentile	Christian Democracy	
7 June 1993	28 April 1997	Bruno Gentile	Christian Democracy	
28 April 1997	14 May 2001	Bruno Gentile	Center	
14 May 2001	30 May 2006	Anna Rita Coletti	Civic list	
30 May 2006	16 May 2011	Anna Rita Coletti	Civic list	
16 May 2011	27 March 2016	Mauro Castagna	United Civic List for Ofena	
6 June 2016		Antonio Silveri	United Civic List for Ofena	
