= Aveia =

Ancient town of the Vestini

Coordinates: 42°18′0″N 13°29′23″E

Aveia was an ancient town of the Vestini and Roman former bishopric, which remains a Latin Catholic titular see.

Its site is on the Via Claudia Nova, c. 10 km south-east of L'Aquila, N.E. of the modern village of Fossa, in central Italy's Abruzzo region.

Some remains of ancient buildings still exist, and the name Aveia still clings to the place. The identification was first made by V. M. Giovenazzi in Della Città di Aveia ne' Vestini (1773). Paintings in the church of S. Maria ad Cryptas, of the 12th to 15th centuries, are important in the history of art. An inscription of a stationarius of the 3rd century, sent here on special duty (no doubt for the suppression of brigandage), was found here in 1902.

== Ecclesiastical history ==
=== Residential Bishopric ===
The bishopric of Aveia (Vestina) was founded in the mid-5th century (circa 450 AD) and disappeared, along with the town, in the 6th-century devastations of the Lombards, circa 500 AD.

Maximus of Aveia, a native of the town and a deacon, was martyred in the persecution of Decius, Roman Emperor from 249 to 251. The bishopric of Aveia may have arisen because of veneration of his relics. After the destruction of the town, these were removed to a nearby town which became known as Civitas Sancti Maximi (Saint Maximus Town), which thereupon became the seat of the diocese. From there, in 1256, they were moved to the new town and diocese of L'Aquila.

=== Titular see ===
No longer a residential bishopric, Aveia is listed by the Catholic Church as titular bishopric of Aveia since the diocese was nominally restored in January 2009.

Its only incumbent so far has been, of fitting episcopal (lowest rank) :

- Titular Bishop (2009.01.30 – ...) Raúl Antonio Chau Quispe, Auxiliary Bishop of Lima (Peru)

== Sources and external links ==
Attribution

- GCatholic
