= Castello ducale Cantelmo =

Castle in Popoli Terme, Italy

Coordinates: 42.1732°N 13.8386°E

Cantelmo Ducal Castle
- Castello ducale Cantelmo
- Popoli Terme
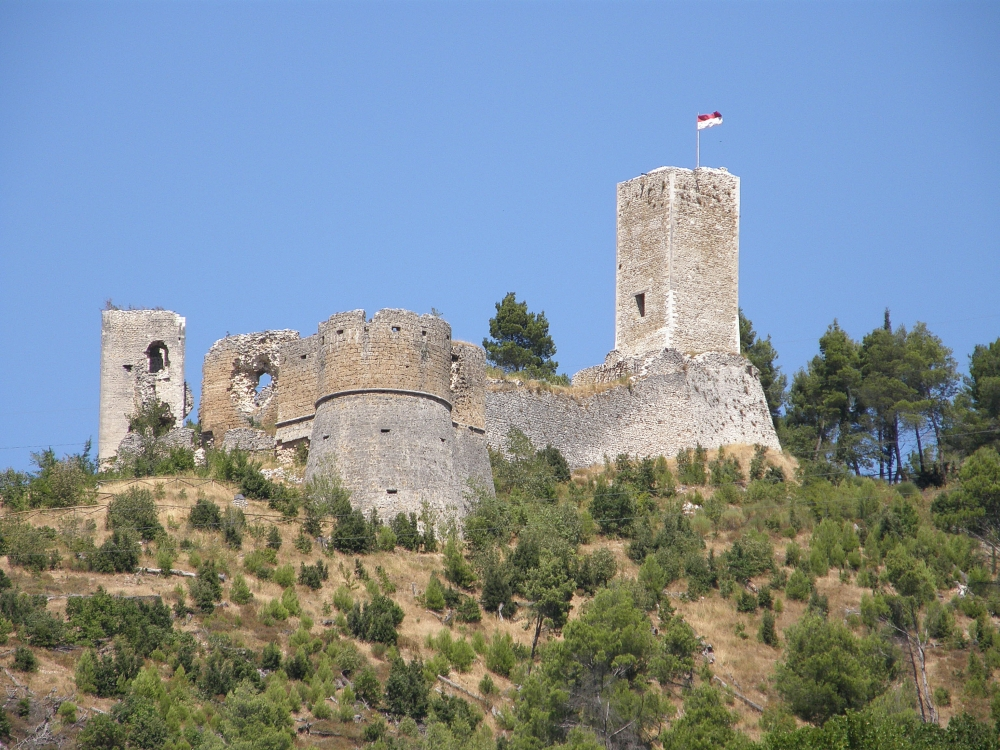
- Castle in Popoli

Site information
- Type: Castle

Location

Site history
- Built: 11th century

Castello ducale Cantelmo (Italian for Cantelmo Ducal Castle) is a Middle Ages castle in Popoli Terme, Province of Pescara (Abruzzo).

== History ==
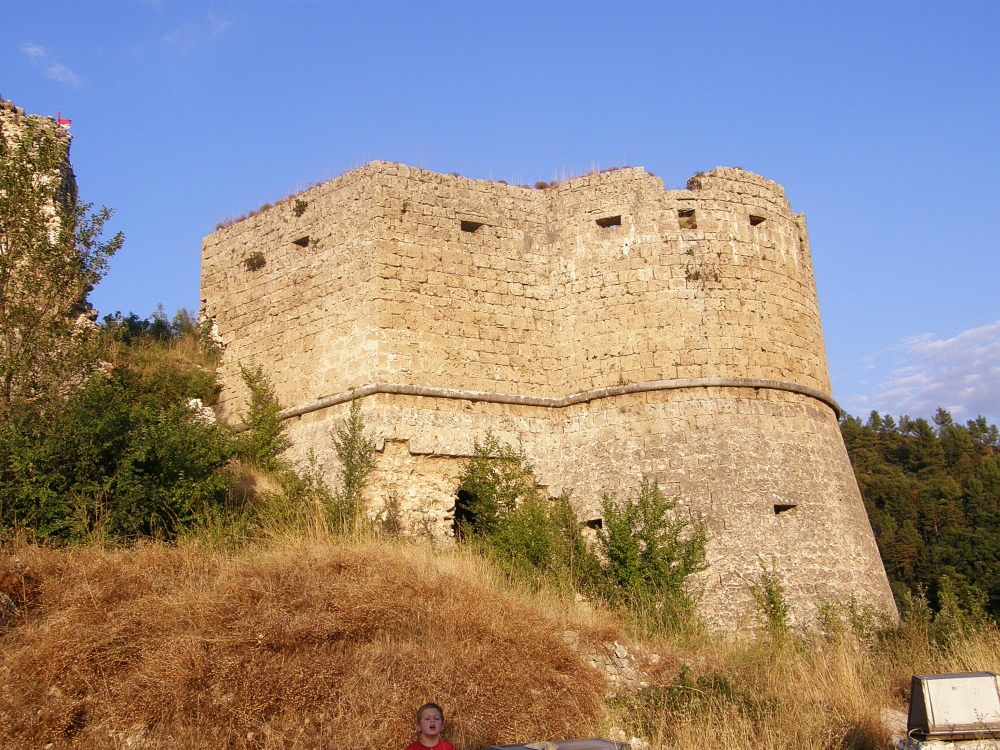
Cantelmo Castle in Popoli Terme

The castle was built around an existing Lombard tower dating back to the 9th century, guarding the pass of the Popoli gorges, protecting the Abbey of San Clemente a Casauria. The triangular layout of the walls, as seen today, was constructed between 1000 and 1015 by the Bishop of Valva Tidolfo but was significantly transformed at the end of the 15th century by the Cantelmo family, who became feudal lords in 1269 and held it until the 17th century. In the mid-11th century, the castle was seized by Count Ugo Malmozzetto of Manoppello, who imposed strict control over the valley on behalf of Robert I of Loritello, and entrusted it to his lieutenant. The Chronicon Casauriense recounts an anecdote in which Count Ugo, a ruthless and power-hungry man, was lured to the castle, known in documents as "Castrum Pauperim", in 1097 by a princess from the nearby fort of Prezza, and was subsequently captured and killed by her brothers who had set the ambush.

The castle was the residence of the Cantelmo family until 1480, when they moved to the Ducal Palace in Popoli Terme. During the Cantelmo rule, who arrived in Abruzzo in 1269 following Charles I of Anjou, the castle was renovated, especially during the Aragonese period, after the 1456 earthquake: an example is the cylindrical south tower, while the pentagonal tower, the so-called upper keep, was modified from its irregular pentagonal shape.

The castle's layout was similar to other Norman fortresses in Abruzzo, such as the castles of Bominaco, San Pio delle Camere, Barisciano, and Stiffe. Initially, the triangular enclosure housed the population for protection against attacks, but from the 13th-14th centuries, as the settlement of Popoli Terme developed in the valley, the oldest part, located between the churches of San Lorenzo and the Holy Trinity, lost its strategic importance.

The Cantelmo family, with Count Restaino, eventually moved to the ducal palace, featuring a beautiful Renaissance loggia, located between via Cavour (formerly via del Colle) and Piazza Regina Margherita (now Piazza della Libertà), with the complex opening towards the stairway of the "twin" churches.

The castle was seriously damaged by the 1706 earthquake and was not rebuilt. 19th-century engravings show that a Renaissance loggia survived, which was later lost. After the 2009 earthquake, a serious consolidation effort was necessary, including the restoration of the towers, completed between 2012 and 2015, and the enhancement of the ascent path from the Popoli Terme village, originally laid out in the 1920s by the famous engineer Corradino D'Ascanio.

== Architecture ==
The fortification overlooks the Tiburtina state road above Popoli Terme. It is a "castle-enclosure" similar to others in the nearby province of L'Aquila, such as San Pio delle Camere, Barisciano, or Fossa.

The layout of the walls is triangular, with the highest vertex of the triangle featuring the original pentagonal watchtower, while further down there are a square-plan tower and a cylindrical tower built later. The cylindrical tower, in particular, is Renaissance, constructed by Count Restaino IV Cantelmo.

The castle, whose ruins have been recently restored, is open to visitors.
