= Castello De Sanctis =

Castle in Roccacasale, Italy

Coordinates: 42.1258°N 13.8862°E

De Sanctis Castle
- Castello De Sanctis
- Roccacasale
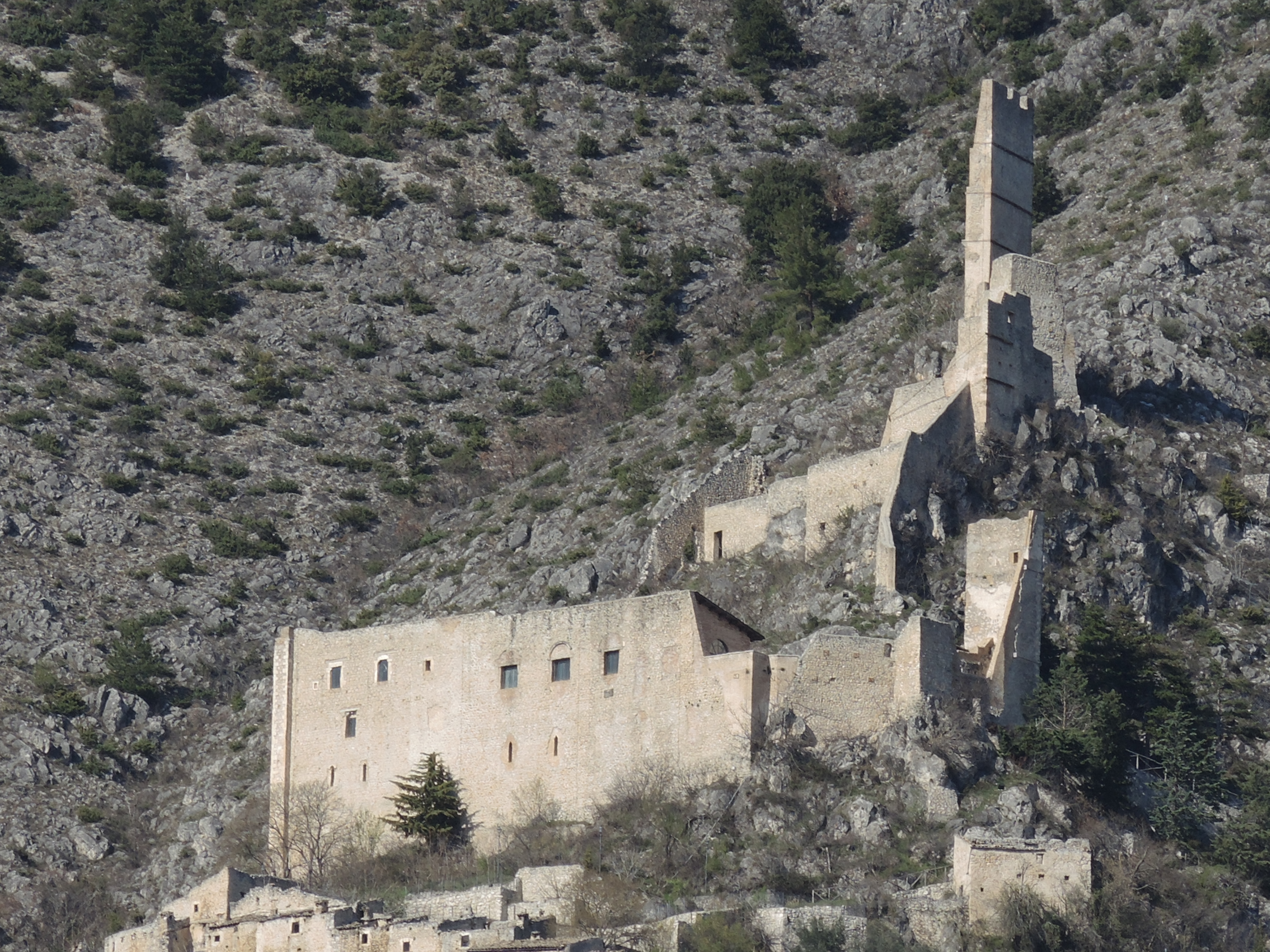
- Castle in Roccacasale

Site information
- Type: Castle

Location

Site history
- Built: 925

Castello De Sanctis (Italian for De Sanctis Castle) is a Middle Ages castle in Roccacasale, Province of L'Aquila (Abruzzo).

== History ==
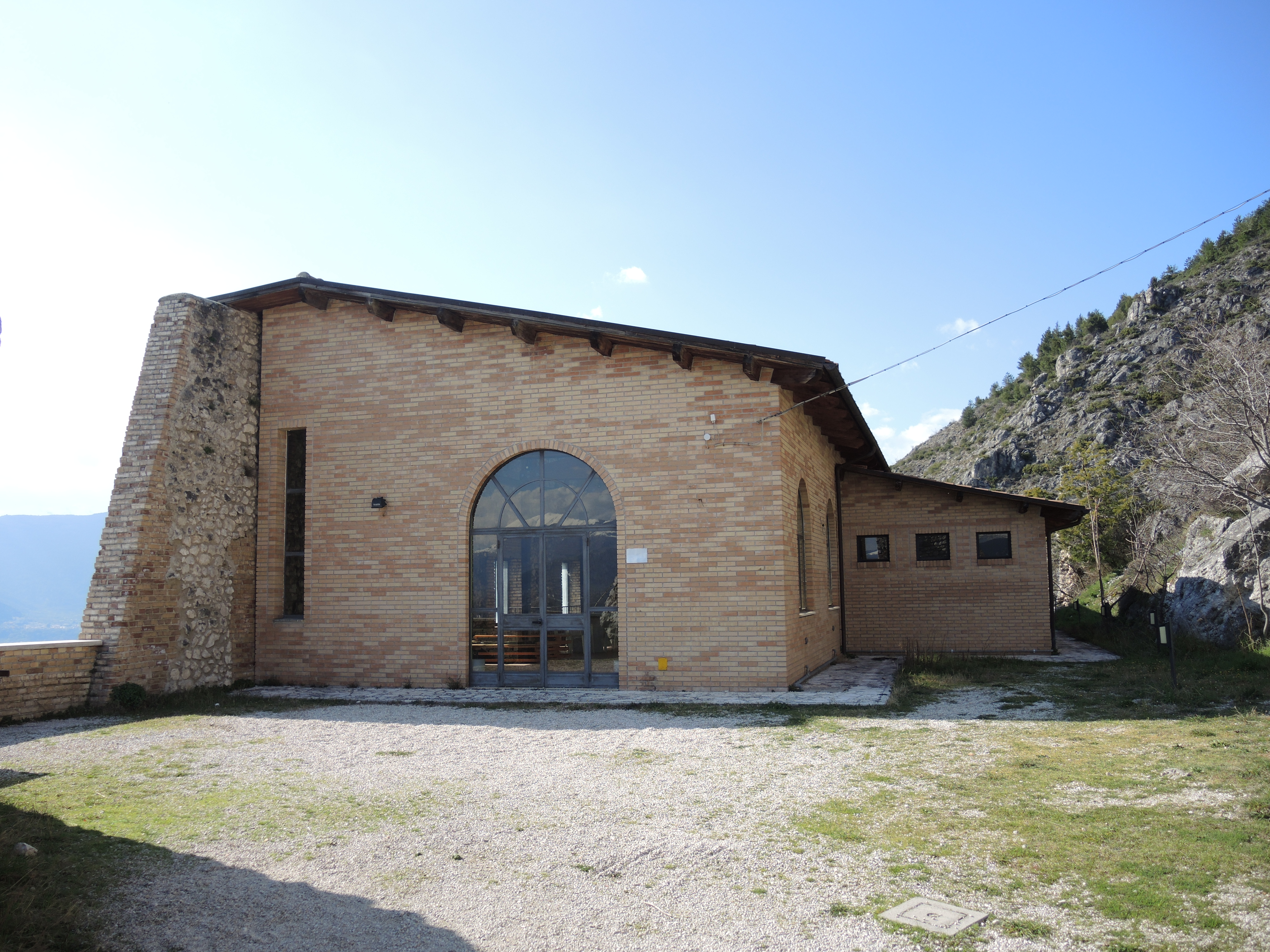
Museum of Documentation and Popular Traditions

Tradition holds that the castle was built in 925 AD by the Counts of Spoleto to control access to the Val di Sangro and the Altopiano delle Cinquemiglia. Between the Middle Ages and the Renaissance, the castle fell under the control of the Cantelmo family, and at the end of the 16th century it passed to the Barons De Sanctis until 1803, when it was destroyed by the French.

From 1994 to 1996, the castle was restored by the Municipality of Roccacasale, taking care of both the pedestrian access path and the remains, in addition to the creation of a structure that since 2004 has housed the Museum of Documentation and Popular Traditions.

== Architecture ==
The castle overlooks the road between Popoli Terme and Sulmona. It is a typical enclosure castle, similar to many others on the Altopiano di Navelli, such as San Pio delle Camere, Barisciano, or Fossa. The plan of the walls is triangular, and at the highest vertex of the triangle, there is a spur, partially collapsed, with a trapezoidal plan. The entrance to the castle, located along the downhill side facing the village, is controlled by a square tower, lacking the inner side.

Unlike other enclosure castles in the province of L'Aquila, Roccacasale also has the remains of a baronial palace, indicating its use not only during times of danger for the village it defended. Continuous presence in the castle is also evidenced by other remains found within the enclosure, such as cisterns and foundations of other dwellings.
