= Taverna ducale, Popoli =

Coordinates: 42.1743°N 13.8329°E

Taverna ducale
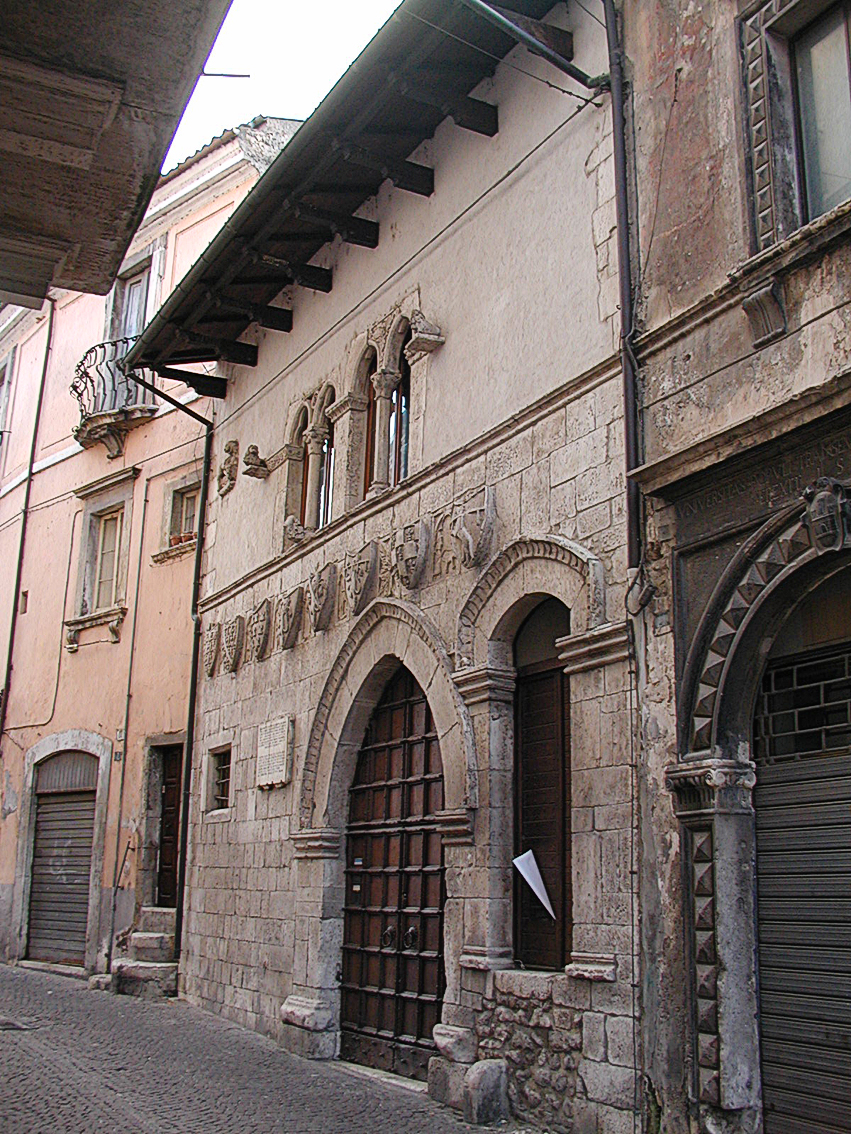
- Location: Popoli
- Type: Art museum

Taverna Ducale di Popoli (Italian for Ducal Tavern of Popoli) is an art museum in Popoli Terme, Abruzzo.

== History ==
The palace, built in the second half of 1300, initially built as a "house-shop" to collect tithes on the products of the properties of Cantelmos family, as the plaque on the facade. Warehouse of goods relating to tithes waiting to be sold, the building later became a tavern for buyers and travelers, with rooms on the upper floor also engaged as a hotel.

Purchased in 1875 by Francesco supplied, the building was used as a stable and then fall into disuse and eventually be purchased by the Ministry of Education. In addition to being a museum, the building is currently used for exhibitions and events. Upstairs is an office of the Superintendence for the Historical Anthropological Heritage of Abruzzo.

== Description ==
The building is characterized by a pointed Gothic portal, and a façade embellished with coats of arms of the noble families that have lived to Cantelmos.
