= Cantelmo =

Cantelmo may refer to:

- Cantelmo (surname), Italian surname
- Cantelmo Castle, Middle Ages castle in Pettorano sul Gizio, province of L'Aquila, Abruzzo, southern-central Italy
- Castello ducale Cantelmo, Middle Ages castle in Popoli Terme, province of Pescara, Abruzzo, southern-central Italy
