= Castle of San Pio delle Camere =

Medieval castle in Abruzzo, Italy

Castle of Fossa
- Castello di San Pio delle Camere
- San Pio delle Camere
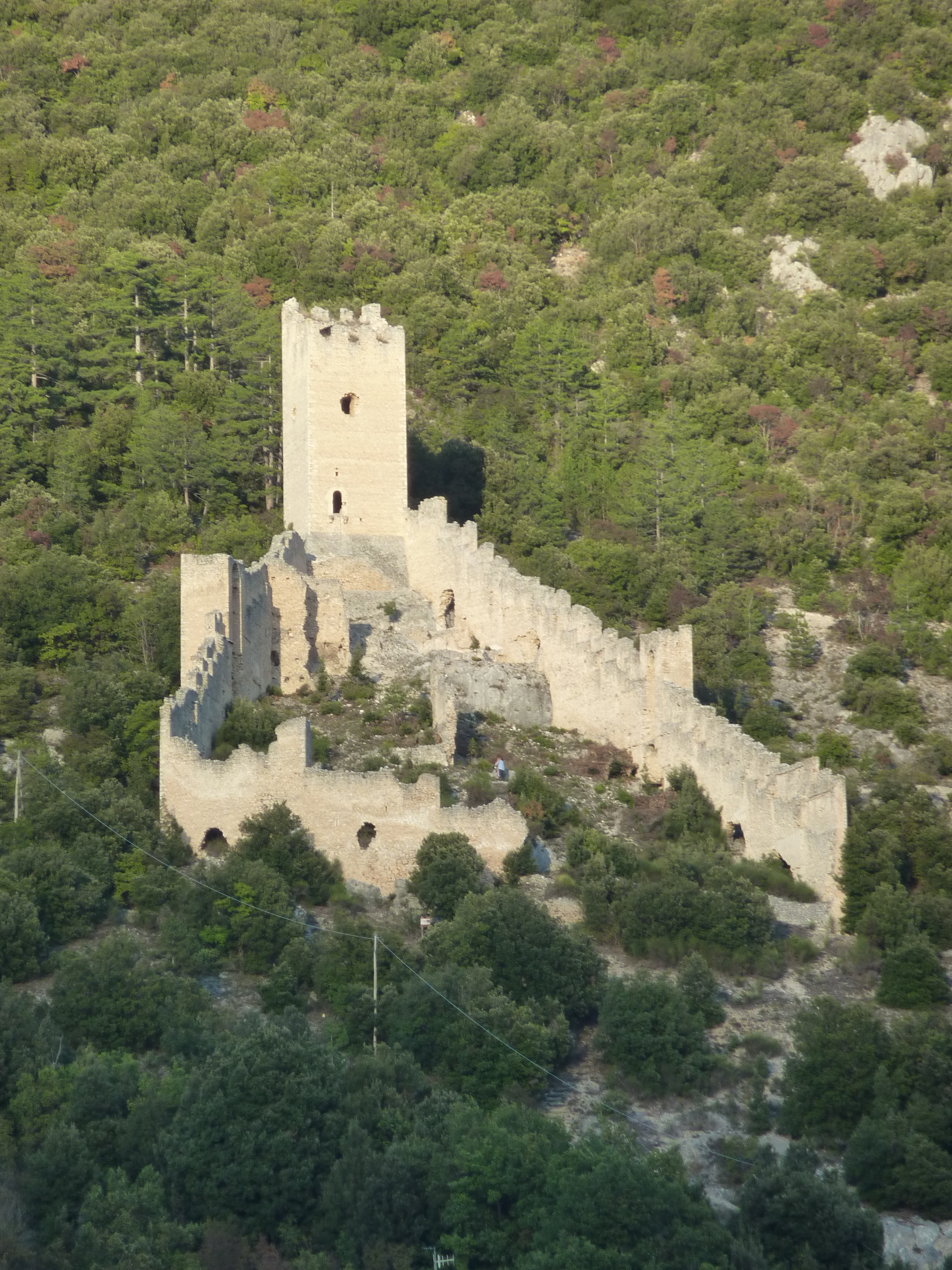
- Castle in San Pio delle Camere

Site information
- Type: Castle

Location
- Coordinates: 42.287178°N 13.660061°E

Site history
- Built: 12th century

The Castle of San Pio delle Camere (Italian: Castello di San Pio delle Camere) is a medieval castle in San Pio delle Camere, province of L'Aquila, Abruzzo, southern Italy.

== History ==
The oldest mention about the castle of San Pio delle Camere date back to 1173, indicating it as a fief of the Barons of Poppleto (nowadays Coppito), later becoming a fief of the House of Caracciolo.

Placed above the town of San Pio delle Camere, the role of the castle was to provide shelter for people and their livestock in time of danger.

The current state of the castle was the result of the attack brought in 1424 by the condottiero Braccio da Montone, involving also the castle of Barisciano.

== Architecture ==
The structure of the castle is an enclosure, with its building that took place in two stages, the first one with the construction of the tower and the second one with the walls.

The tower's plan is formed by a square and an equilateral triangle. The plan of the walls is triangular, with the tower at the top and other smaller towers along the walls.

The structure of the castle has been revised several times, as shown, for example, by the raising of the walls, that probably took place in the 14th century.
