= Palazzo Santucci =

Coordinates: 42.2386°N 13.7286°E

Santucci Palace
- Palazzo Santucci
- Navelli
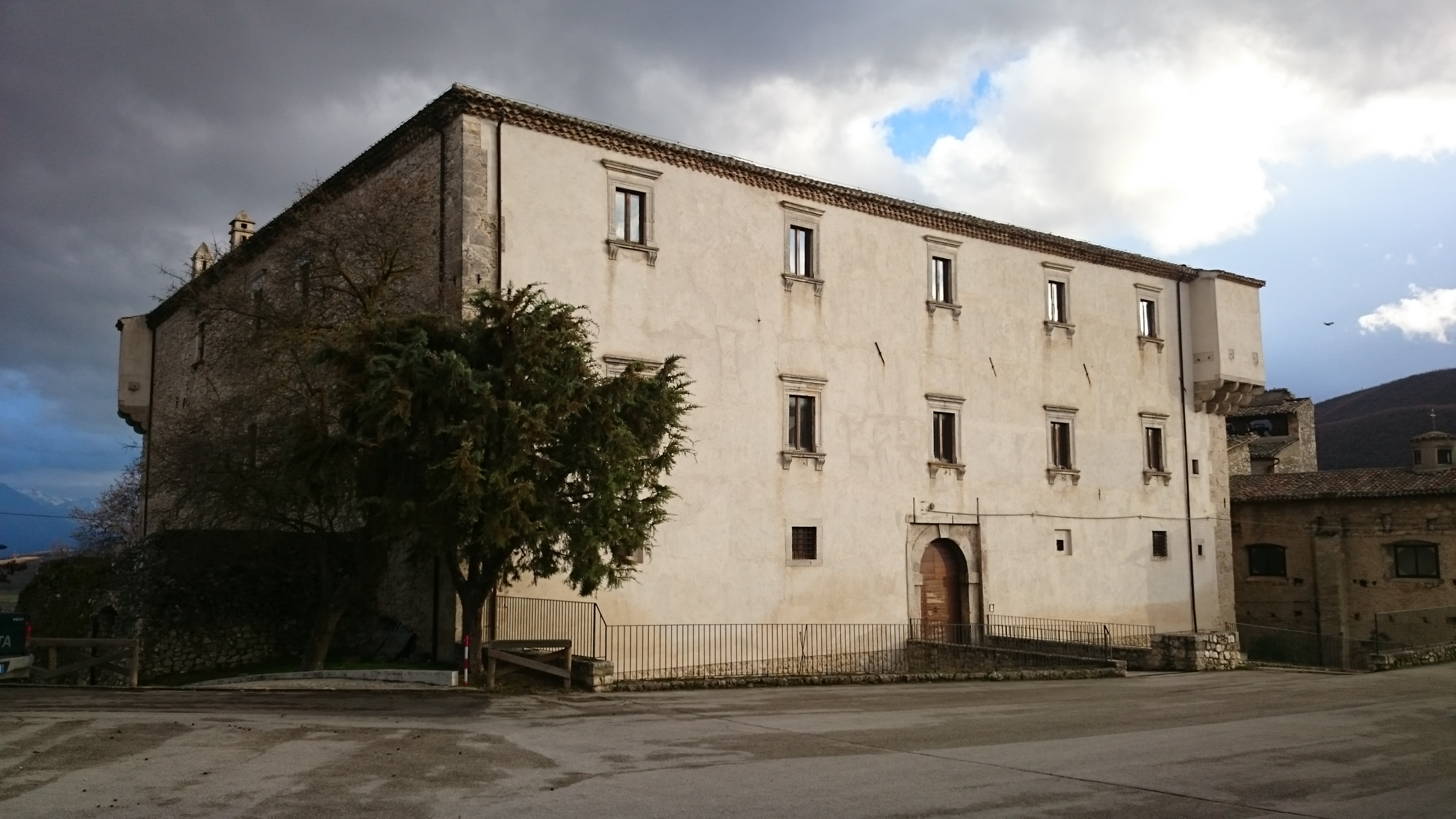
- Palace in Navelli

Site information
- Type: Castle

Location
- Location within Italy

Site history
- Built: 1632

Palazzo Santucci (Italian for Santucci Palace) is a Renaissance fortified palace in Navelli, Province of L'Aquila (Abruzzo).

== History ==
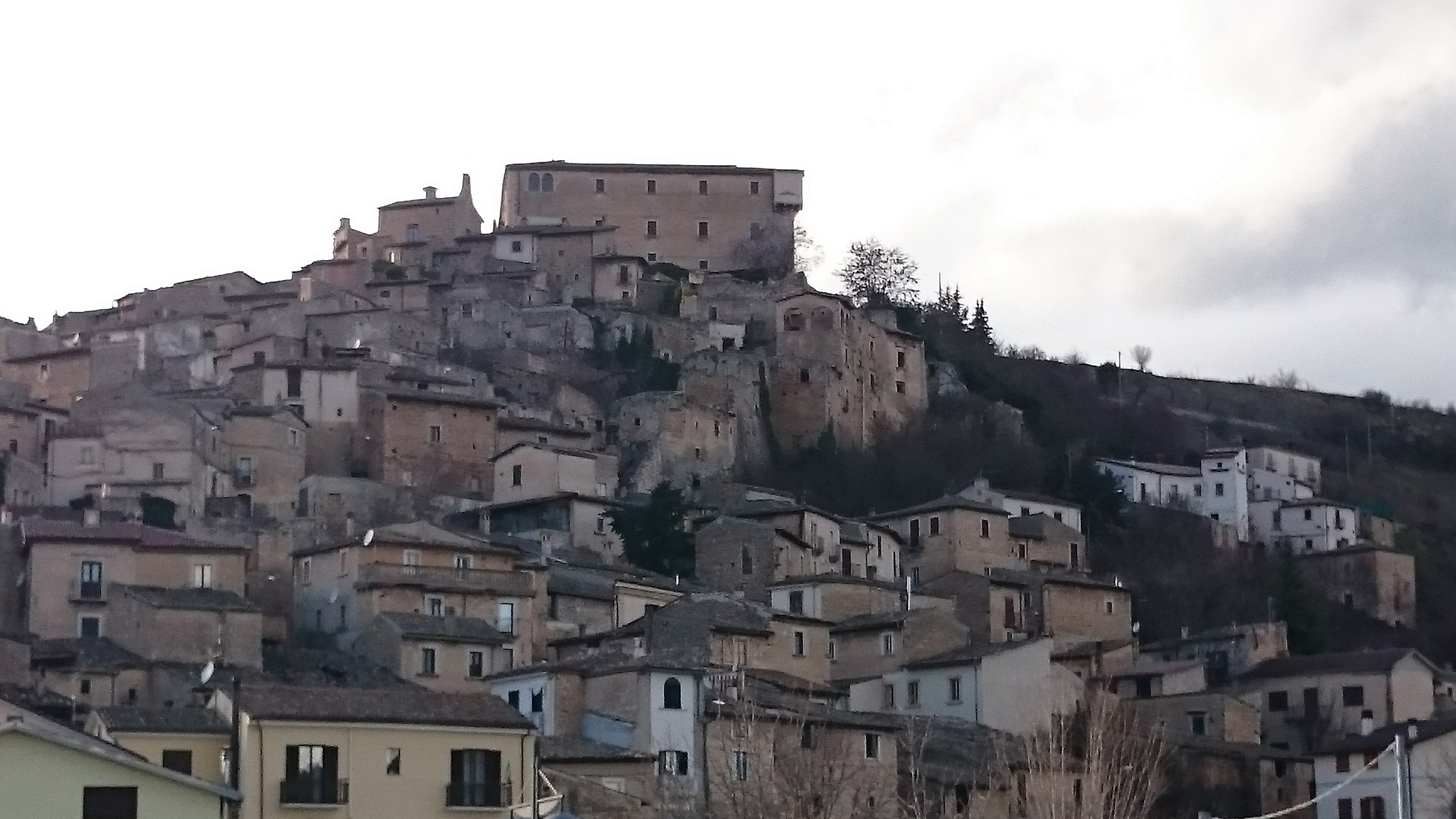
Palazzo Santucci dominates the town of Navelli

The initial core of the palace dates back to the 8th–10th century, when the phenomenon of incastellamento led the population to gather around a castle built on the hill of present-day Navelli. The castle was surrounded by a curtain wall, which is now completely incorporated within the village.

At the behest of the feudal lord Camillo Caracciolo, the Baronial Palace was built in 1632 on the ruins of the old castle. This building served as the residence for various feudal lords of Navelli until the late 1700s and adopted their names, such as "Castle Trasmondi-Tomassetti", named after the last feudal families of the town before the abolition of feudalism in 1806. It later became known as Palazzo Santucci, after its last owners.

== Architecture ==
The architecture of the palace combines residential and defensive features, mainly represented by the external corner towers.

Inside, the palace features a large courtyard with a central well. On the western side of the palace, a double staircase leads to a loggia. Around the palace, traces of a surrounding moat can still be seen.
