= Roccacasale =

- Comune
- Comune di Roccacasale
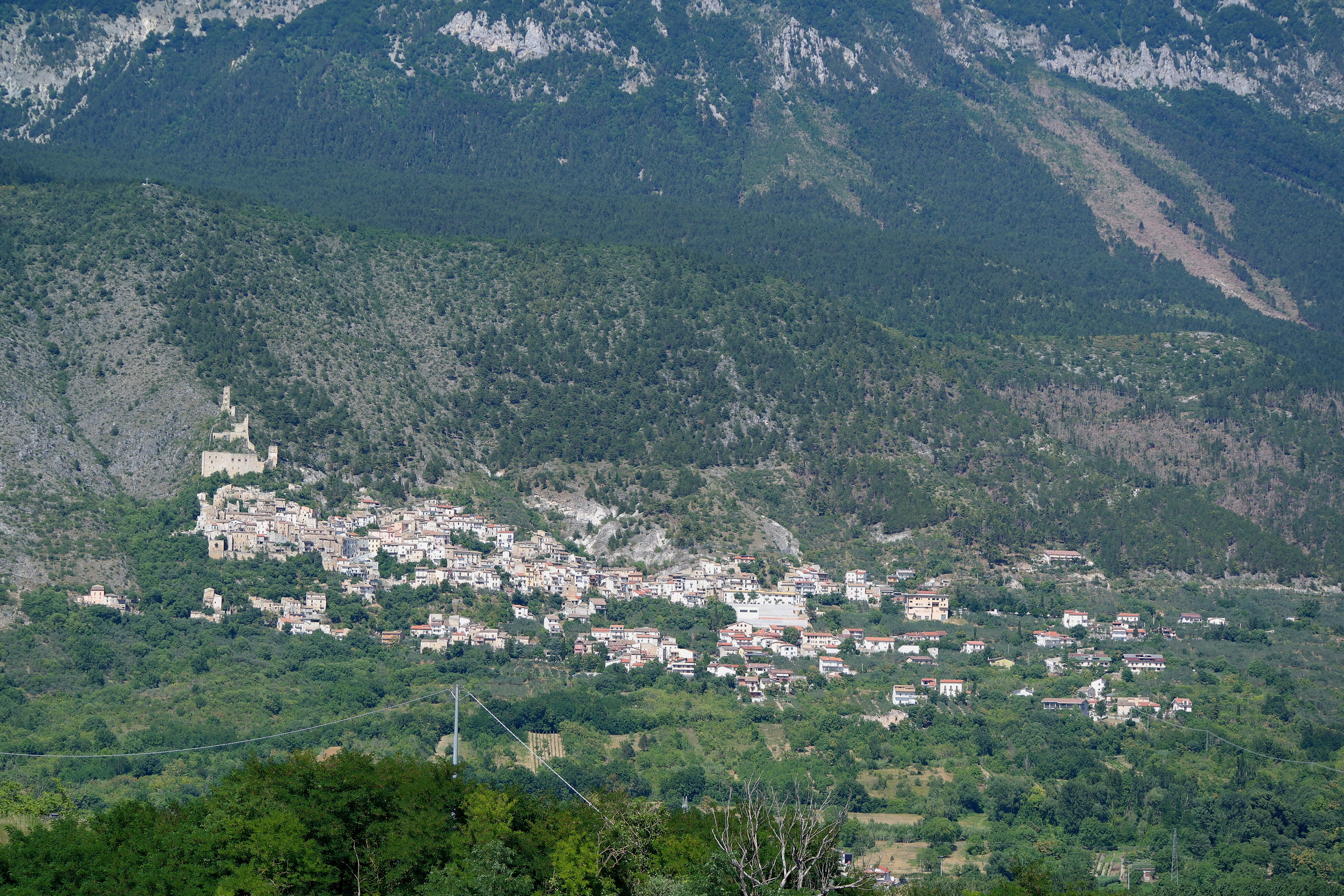

- Location within Italy Location within Abruzzo
- Coordinates: 42°7′N 13°53′E
- Country: Italy
- Region: Abruzzo
- Province: Province of L'Aquila (AQ)

Government
  - Mayor: Domenico Spagnuolo

Area
  - Total: 17.21 km^{2} (6.64 sq mi)
- Elevation: 450 m (1,480 ft)

Population (2005)
  - Total: 730
  - Density: 42/km^{2} (110/sq mi)
- Demonym: Roccolani
- Time zone: UTC+1 (CET)
  - Summer (DST): UTC+2 (CEST)
- Postal code: 67030
- Dialing code: 0864
- Website: Official website

Roccacasale (locally La Rocca) is a comune in the Province of L'Aquila in the Abruzzo region of Italy. Built on the slopes of the Monte della Rocca in the central Apennines, the village overlooks the Peligna Valley and the town of Sulmona.

The village arose from a small settlement called Casali, which had few inhabitants prior to 925. As a result of the construction of the fortified rocca, sited to control the entrance to the Valle del Sangro and the Cinquemiglia plain, from Saracen or Byzantine, the centre formed, with the passing of time, into a typical medieval walled village on the slopes directly under the castle. The higher part of the village consists of steep roads leading towards the castle, and linked by narrow passageways between buildings constructed on the naked bedrock. Inside the ancient village are the church of Saint Michael Archangel (consecrated in 1579) and the remains of the baronial palazzo, constructed by the de Sanctis, barons of Roccacasale, next to the church more recently than the castle; very little remains of the palazzo today.
