= Vittorito =

- Comune
- Comune di Vittorito
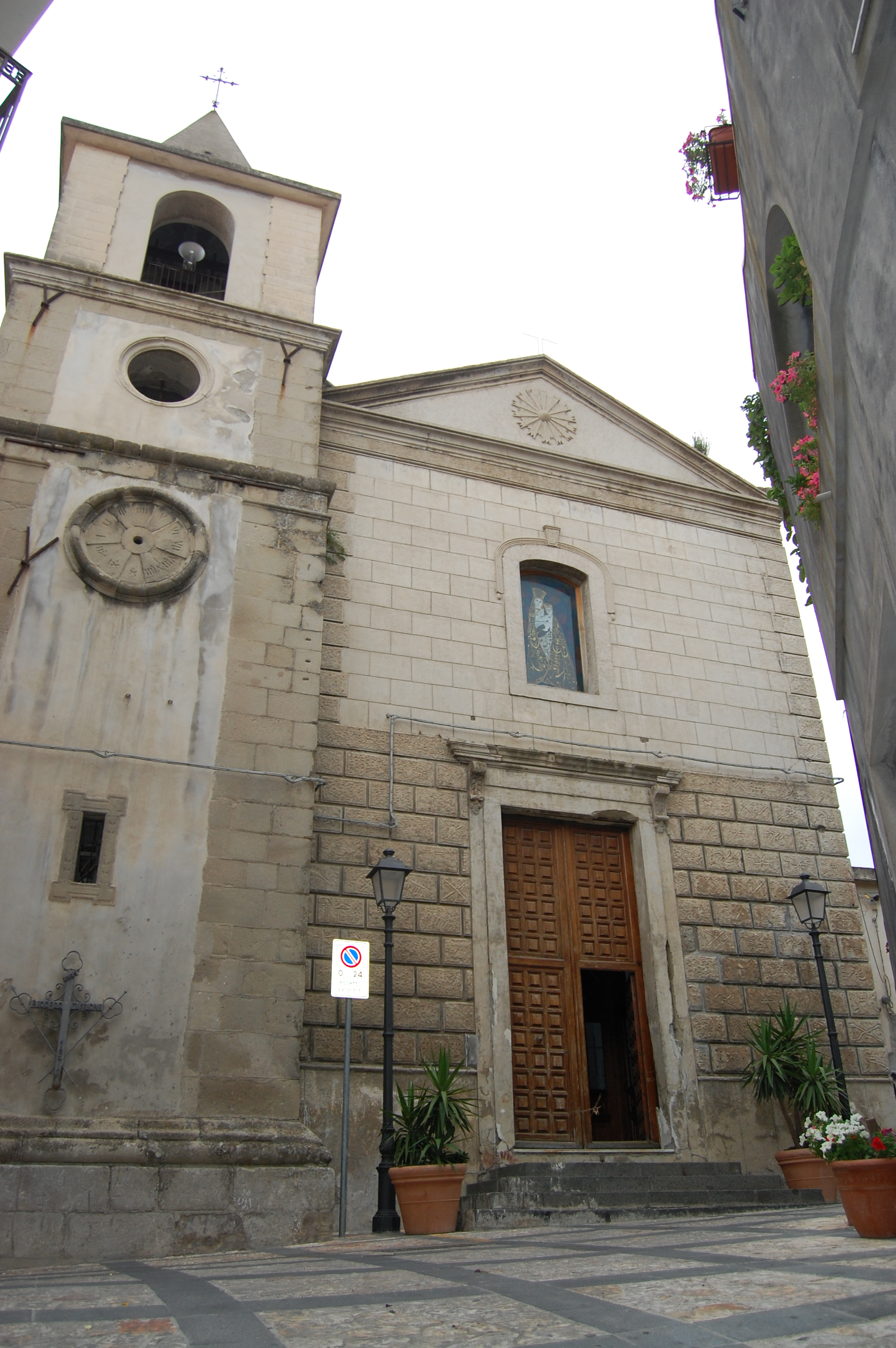
- Saint Michael's church, Vittorito

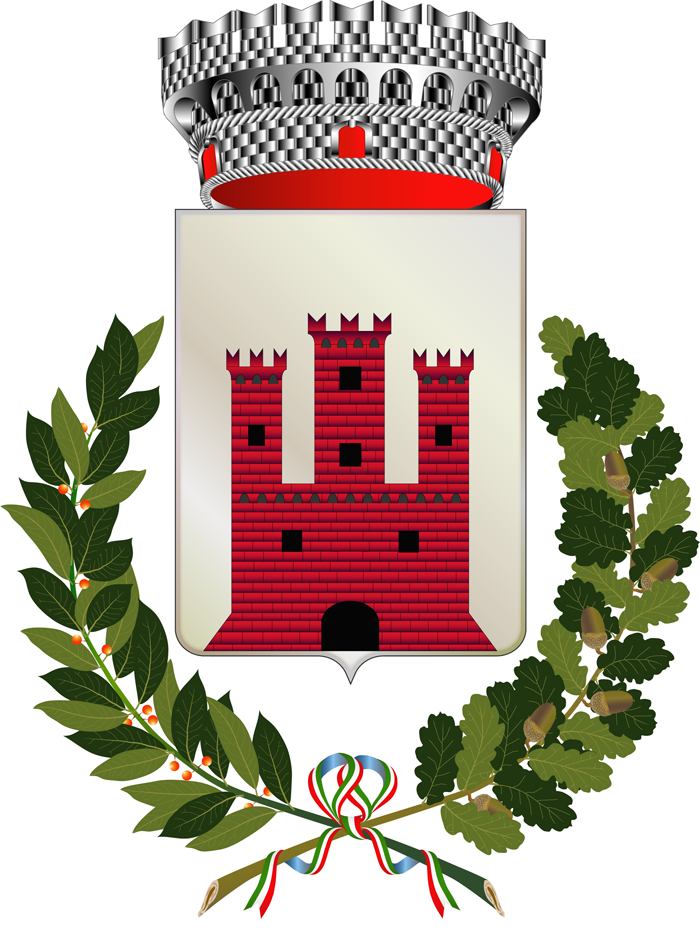
- Coat of arms

- Location within Italy Location within Abruzzo
- Coordinates: 42°7′41″N 13°49′3″E
- Country: Italy
- Region: Abruzzo
- Province: L'Aquila (AQ)
- Frazioni: Corfinio, Molina Aterno, Popoli (PE), Raiano, San Benedetto in Perillis

Government
  - Mayor: Carmine Presutti

Area
  - Total: 14.04 km^{2} (5.42 sq mi)
- Elevation: 377 m (1,237 ft)

Population (1 January 2007)
  - Total: 960
  - Density: 68/km^{2} (180/sq mi)
- Demonym: Vittoritesi
- Time zone: UTC+1 (CET)
  - Summer (DST): UTC+2 (CEST)
- Postal code: 67030
- Dialing code: 0864
- ISTAT code: 066108
- Patron saint: San Biagio
- Saint day: 3 February

Vittorito (Abruzzese: Vëtturréitë) is a comune and town in the Province of L'Aquila in the Abruzzo region of Italy.
