= Picenze =

- Frazione
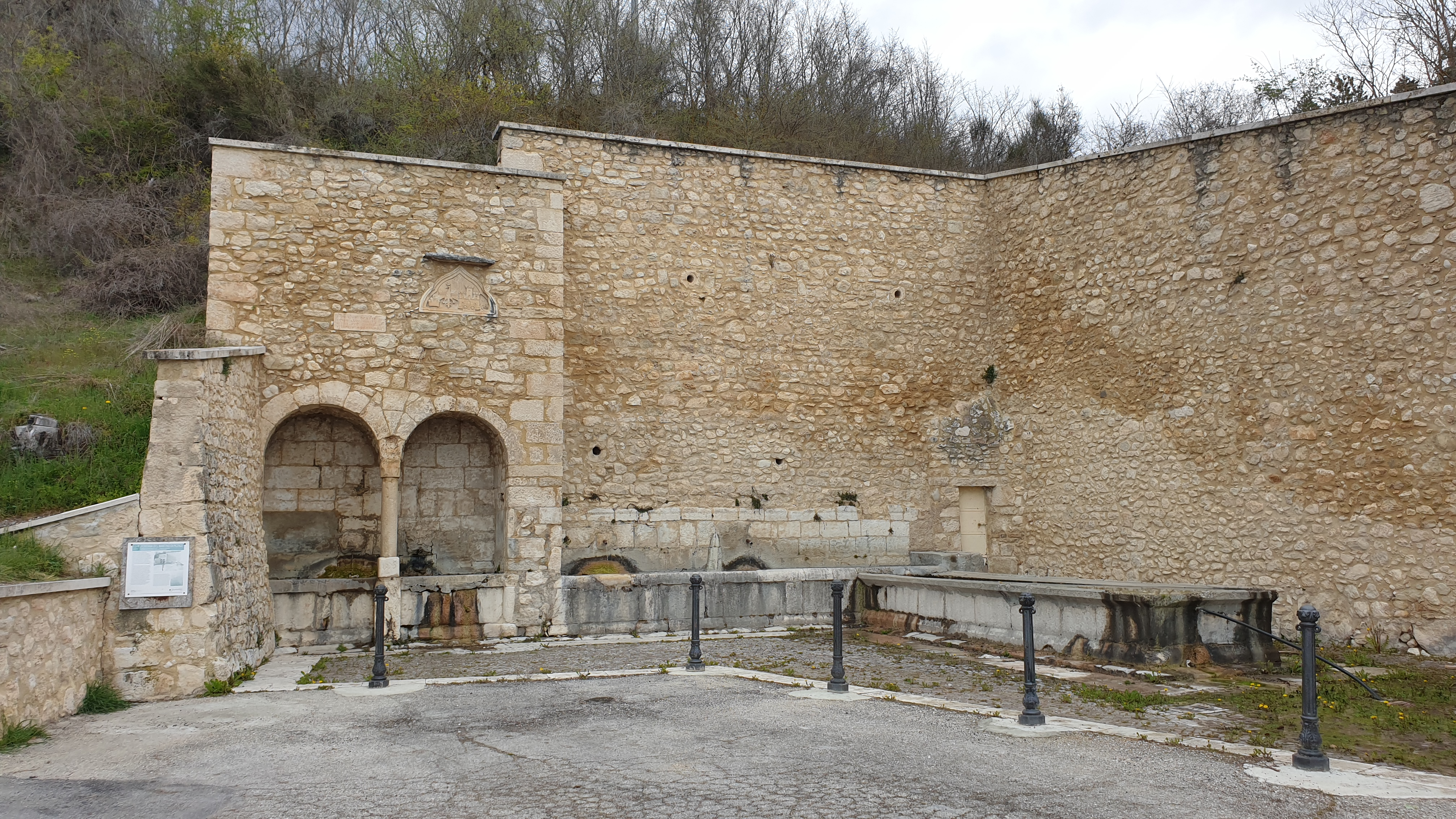

- Location of Picenze in Italy
- Coordinates: 42°19′24″N 13°31′59″E
- Country: Italy
- Region: Abruzzo
- Province: L'Aquila
- Comune: Barisciano
- Elevation: 850 m (2,790 ft)

Population
  - Total: 575
- Demonym: Picenzari
- Time zone: UTC+1 (CET)
  - Summer (DST): UTC+2 (CEST)
- Postal code: 67021
- Dialing code: 0862
- Patron saint: San Martino di Tours, San Valentino

Picenze is a frazione of Barisciano, in the province of L'Aquila in the Abruzzo region of Italy, which includes the locality of San Martino, Villa di Mezzo and Petogna.

== Earthquake April 6, 2009 ==
The territory of Picenze was affected by the 2009 L'Aquila earthquake, Richter magnitude (ML) 5.9, occurred at a depth of about 10 km. There were no effects on people, but the architectural heritage has been severely compromised, with injuries and slumps.
