= Alfred von Reumont =

German scholar and diplomatist

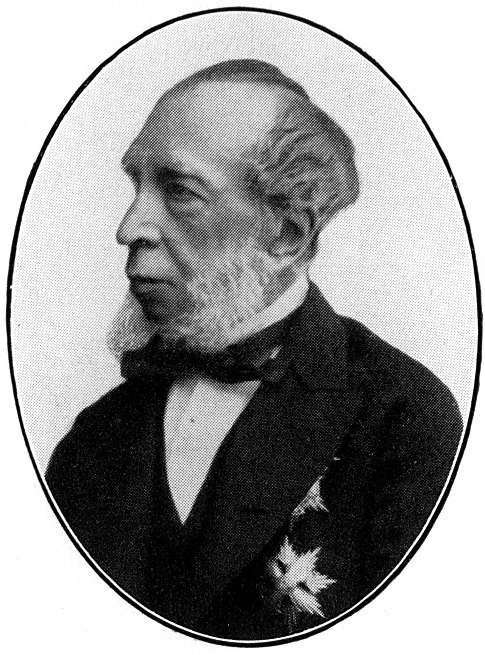
Alfred von Reumont (1808-1887)

Alfred von Reumont (15 August 1808 – 27 April 1887) was a German scholar and diplomatist.

== Biography ==
He was the son of Gerhard Reumont (1765-1829), and named Alfred after the English king Alfred the Great. Educated at the universities of Bonn and Heidelberg, he obtained a position in Florence through the influence of an Englishman, William Craufurd, but soon he entered the Prussian diplomatic service and was employed in Florence, in Constantinople and in Rome. He also spent some time in the Foreign Office in Berlin. From 1851 to 1860 he represented his country in Florence. Reumont was the friend and adviser of Frederick William IV. In 1879 he founded the Aachener Geschichtsverein, and having spent his concluding years at Bonn and at Aix-la-Chapelle, he died in the latter city on 27 April 1887.

== Works ==
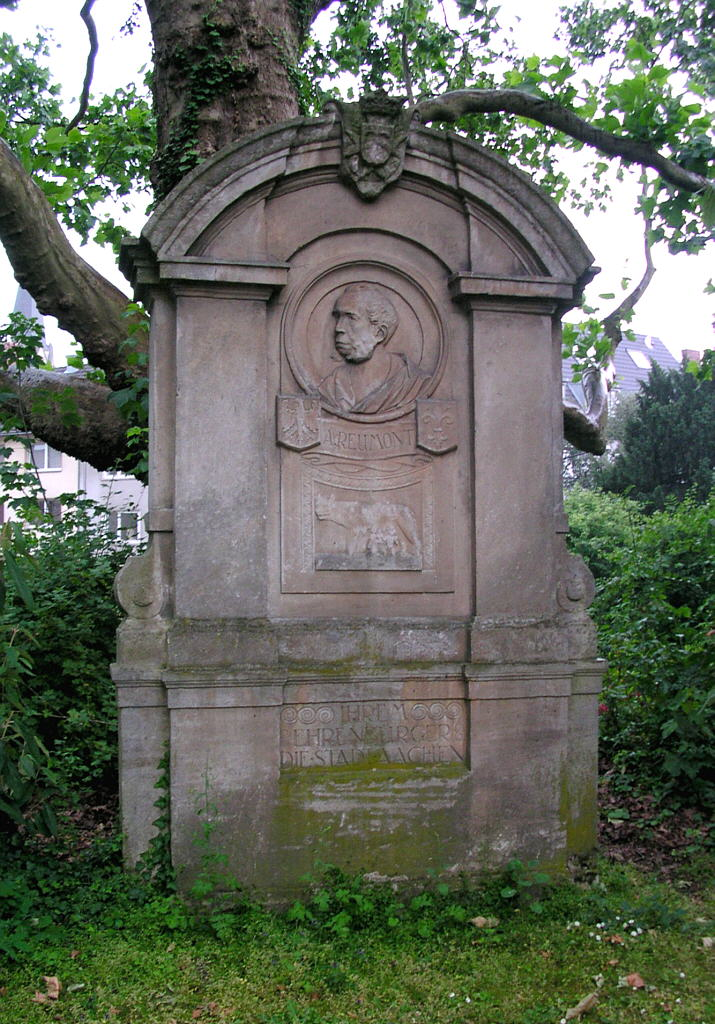
Reumont Monument Aachen

Reumont's numerous writings deal mainly with Italy, in which country he passed many years of his life. On the history of Florence and of Tuscany he wrote Tavole cronologiche e sincrone della storia fiorentina (1841; Supplement, 1875); Geschichte Toscanas seit dem Ende des florentinischen Freistaats (History of Toscany since the end of the Florentine freestate, Gotha, 1876–77); and a work on Lorenzo de' Medici (Leipzig, 1874, and again 1883). This last book has been translated into English by R Harrison (1876). He remembered his connection with Florence when he wrote Römische Briefe von einem Florentiner (Roman letters from a Florentine, Leipzig, 1840–44), and his residence in Rome was also responsible for his Geschichte der Stadt Rom (3 vols., 1867–70).

Turning his attention to the history of Naples, he wrote Die Carafa von Maddaloni Neapel unter spanischer Herrschaft (1851; Eng. trans., 1854), and more general works on Italian history are: Beiträge zur italienischen Geschichte (6 vols., Berlin, 1853–57), and Charakterbilder aus der neueren Geschichte Italiens (1886).

More strictly biographical in their nature are: Die Jugend Caterinas de' Medici (Youth of Catherine de' Medici, 1854), which has been translated into French by A. Baschet (1866); Die Gräfin von Albany (1860) and a life of his close friend Capponi, Gino Capponi, ein Zeit- und Lebensbild (Life and Times of Gino Capponi, Gotha, 1880). His Ganganelli: Papst Clemens XIV., seine Briefe und seine Zeit (Ganganelli: Pope Clement XIV, his letters and times, Berlin, 1847) is valuable for the relations between this pope and the Jesuits.

Other works which may be mentioned are Zeitgenossen, Biografien und Charakteristichen (Berlin, 1862); Bibliografia dei lavori pubblicati in Germania sulla storia d'Italia (Berlin, 1863); Biographische Denkblätter nach personlichen Erinnerungen (Biographical memorials from personal memories, Leipzig, 1878); and Saggi di storia e letteratura (Florence, 1880). Reumont's other important work, one which he was peculiarly fitted to write, was his Aus Friedrich Wilhelms IV. gesunden und kranken Tagen (From Frederick William IV's healthy and sick days, Leipzig, 1885).
