= Corradino D'Ascanio =

Italian engineer (1891–1981)

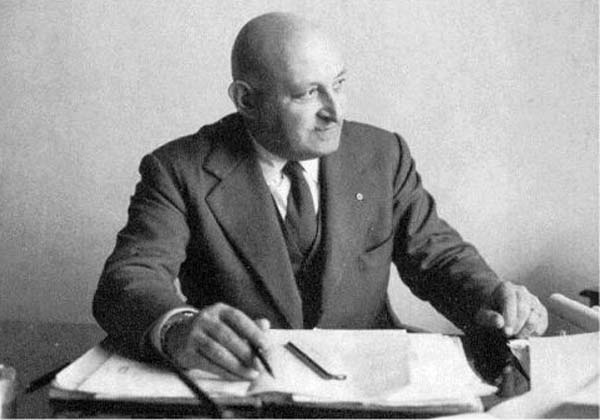
- Corradino D'Ascanio
- Born: 1 February 1891; Popoli, Kingdom of Italy
- Died: 5 August 1981 (aged 90); Pisa, Italy
- Education: Polytechnic University of Turin
- Occupations: Aeronautical engineer, aircraft designer
- Known for: Design of the first production helicopter Design of original Vespa
- Awards: Italian Medal of Merit for Culture and Art (1961); Knight Grand Cross of the Order of Merit of the Italian Republic (1976)
- Military career
- Allegiance: Kingdom of Italy
- Branch: Arma del genio
- Service years: 1915–1918
- Rank: Sottotenente
- Scientific career
- Fields: Aeronautical engineering Mechanical engineering
- Workplaces: Fabbrica Aeroplani Ing. O. Pomilio; Pomilio Brothers Corporation; Piaggio Aerospace; Agusta

General Corradino D'Ascanio (1 February 1891 in Popoli, Pescara – 6 August 1981 in Pisa) was an Italian aeronautical engineer. D'Ascanio designed the first production helicopter, for Agusta, and designed the first motor scooter for Ferdinando Innocenti. After the two fell out, D'Ascanio helped Enrico Piaggio produce the original Vespa.

== Biography ==
D'Ascanio had an early passion for flight and design: by the age of fifteen, after studying flying techniques and the ratio between weight and wingspan of some birds, he built an experimental glider which he would launch from the hills near his home town.

=== World War I ===
After graduating in 1914 in mechanical engineering at the Politecnico di Torino, he enlisted in the voluntary division of the Italian Army entitled "weapon of Engineers, Division Battalion Aviatori" in Piedmont, where he was assigned the testing of airplane engines. Appointed sub-lieutenant on March 21, 1915, D'Ascanio was sent to France to choose a rotary engine to be produced in Italy for the Corpo Aeronautico Militare, returning with an agreement to produce the Gnome et Rhône designed Le Rhône.

After a brief pilot training course in Corsica on a Farman MF.7, he returned to engineering, designing a patented forward-facing monitoring device to improve maintenance monitoring within flight squadrons (estimated to have saved fifty lives), and took part in the trials of the first radio equipment installed in Italian aircraft.

In 1916 D'Ascanio was assigned to join Fabbrica Aeroplani Ing. O. Pomilio, engaged in the manufacture of equipment SP2, Type C, D Type and others. Following the end of World War I, the Pomilio brothers sold the company and moved in 1918 with key staff, including D'Ascanio, to Indianapolis in the United States to form the Pomilio Brothers Corporation.

=== Between the wars ===
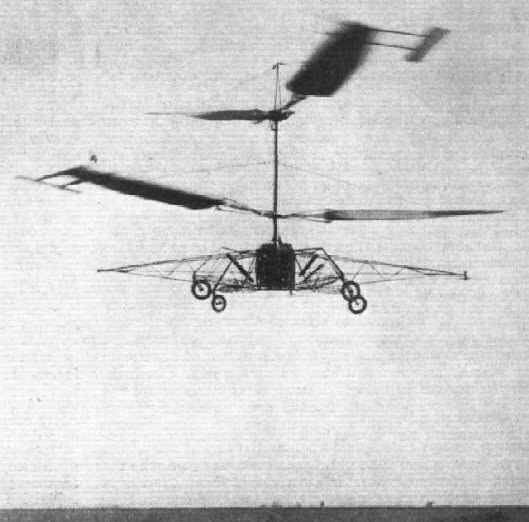
D'AT3

On his return to Italy after a year in 1919, D'Ascanio again settled in Popoli, focused on the control mechanisms for helicopters, through which he derived a number of patents. In 1925 he founded a company with Baron Pietro Trojani, which commissioned by the Ministry of the Air Force produced in 1930 its third prototype, the coaxial D'AT3. This relatively large machine had two double-bladed, counter-rotating rotors, with control achieved by using auxiliary wings or servo-tabs on the trailing edges of the blades, a concept that was later adopted by other helicopter designers, initially by the French Breguet-Dorand Gyroplane Laboratoire in 1935, and still later by designs from both Bleeker and Kaman. Three small propellers mounted on the airframe were used for additional control of pitch, roll, and yaw. Piloted by Marinello Nelli in October 1930 at Ciampino Airport, this machine held modest Fédération Aéronautique Internationale speed and altitude records for the time, including altitude (18 m), duration (8 minutes 45 seconds) and distance flown (1,078 m). D'Ascanio's altitude record would be "unofficially" shattered by the Soviet-built, Yuriev-Cheremukhin TsAGI-1EA single-lift rotor helicopter in mid-August 1932, with a 605 meters (1,985 ft) altitude achievement, and also possessed fore-and-aft tubular fuselage structures for similar "anti-torque" stabilization rotors.

However, during the Depression, in which the fascist government of Benito Mussolini concentrated on "standard" production items, the company collapsed in 1932, and D'Ascanio went to work for Enrico Piaggio at his father's company, designing numerous successful high-speed adjustable pitch propellers for Piaggio Aero. His work was considered so important during World War II, he was promoted to General in the Regia Aeronautica, and restarted helicopter development under instruction from President of Piaggio S.p.A. Enrico Piaggio from 1942.

=== After the war ===
Like many Italians, D'Ascanio found himself unemployed—the Piaggio factory was destroyed through Allied bombing. Worse still, Italy was under an agreement not to research or produce military or aerospace technology for a ten-year period, and so he was unemployable in Italy. Approached by pre-war tubing manufacturer Ferdinando Innocenti, who saw the future of cheap private transport and decided to produce a motor scooter—competing on cost and weather protection against the ubiquitous motorcycle.

=== The Vespa ===
The main stimulus for the design style of the proposed Lambretta dated back to Pre-WWII Cushman scooters made in Nebraska, USA. These olive green scooters were in Italy in large numbers, ordered originally by the US Government as field transport for the Paratroops and Marines. The US military had used them to get around Nazi defence tactics, destroying roads and bridges during the Battle of Monte Cassino and in the Dolomites and the Austrian border areas.

== The motor scooter ==
Ferdinando Innocenti gave D'Ascanio the job of designing a simple, robust and affordable vehicle. The vehicle had to be easy to ride for both men and women, be able to carry a passenger, and not get its driver's clothes dirty. D'Ascanio, who hated motorcycles, designed a revolutionary vehicle. It was built on a spar-frame with a handlebar gear change, and the engine mounted directly on to the rear wheel. The front protection "shield" kept the rider dry and clean in comparison to the open front-end on motorcycles. The pass-through leg area design was geared towards all user groups, including women, whose skirts made riding a motorcycle a challenge. The front fork, like an aircraft's landing gear, allowed for easy wheel changing. The internal mesh transmission eliminated the standard motorcycle chain, a source of oil, dirt, and aesthetic misery. This basic design allowed a series of features to be deployed on the frame, which would later allow quick development of new models.

However, D'Ascanio fell out with Innocenti, who wanted to produce his frame from rolled tubing, rather than a stamped spar frame, thereby allowing him to revive both parts of his pre-war company. General D'Ascanio dissociated himself from Innocenti, and took his design directly to Enrico Piaggio, who produced the spar-framed Vespa from 1946. Innocenti, faced by design problems and production issues surrounding his tube frame, produced the Lambretta from 1947. In the decades of its history, the Vespa scooter has become one of the most famous brand designs worldwide, with 16 million units produced in 130 different models as of 2005.

=== After Vespa ===
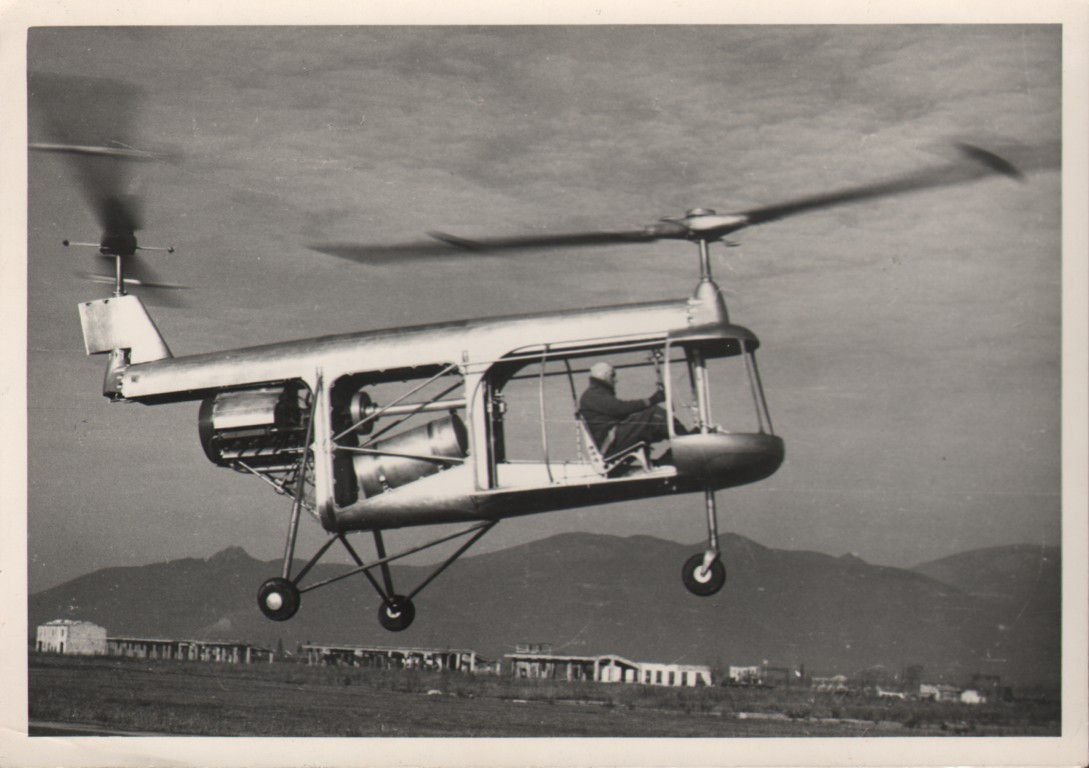
Piaggio PD.4

In 1948 D'Ascanio attended an international congress for the helicopter in Philadelphia, where he was hailed as a true pioneer. He continued to work for Piaggio, tweaking designs for the Piaggio PD.3, and in 1952 the Piaggio PD.4. However, restricted legally through neutrality agreements and financially through reconstruction, Piaggio had by now fallen behind the developments of the American Sikorsky Aircraft Corporation, and few of D'Ascanio helicopter designs or aeronautical developments made it beyond the drawing board.

In 1964 D'Ascanio left Piaggio to join the Agusta Group of Cascina Costa, by then the largest Italian manufacturer of helicopters. In 1969 D'Ascanio designed a small training helicopter, the Agusta ADA, which could be modified for agricultural use—but it was not developed, due to Agusta's commitment to re-equipping the Italian military.

Author of numerous scientific publications, published between 1954 and 1980, he was professor of design of machines and projects at the University of Pisa between 1937 (when he was an employee of Piaggio) and 1961. D'Ascanio, for his services to Italy and aeronautical development, was decorated with the Order of Merit of the Italian Republic by the President of the Italian Republic.

Always disappointed by the fact that, publicly, he was recognised more for his association with the Vespa motor scooter than for his inventions and patents in the world of aviation, D'Ascanio died in Pisa on 6 August 1981.
