= Gino Capponi =

Italian politician

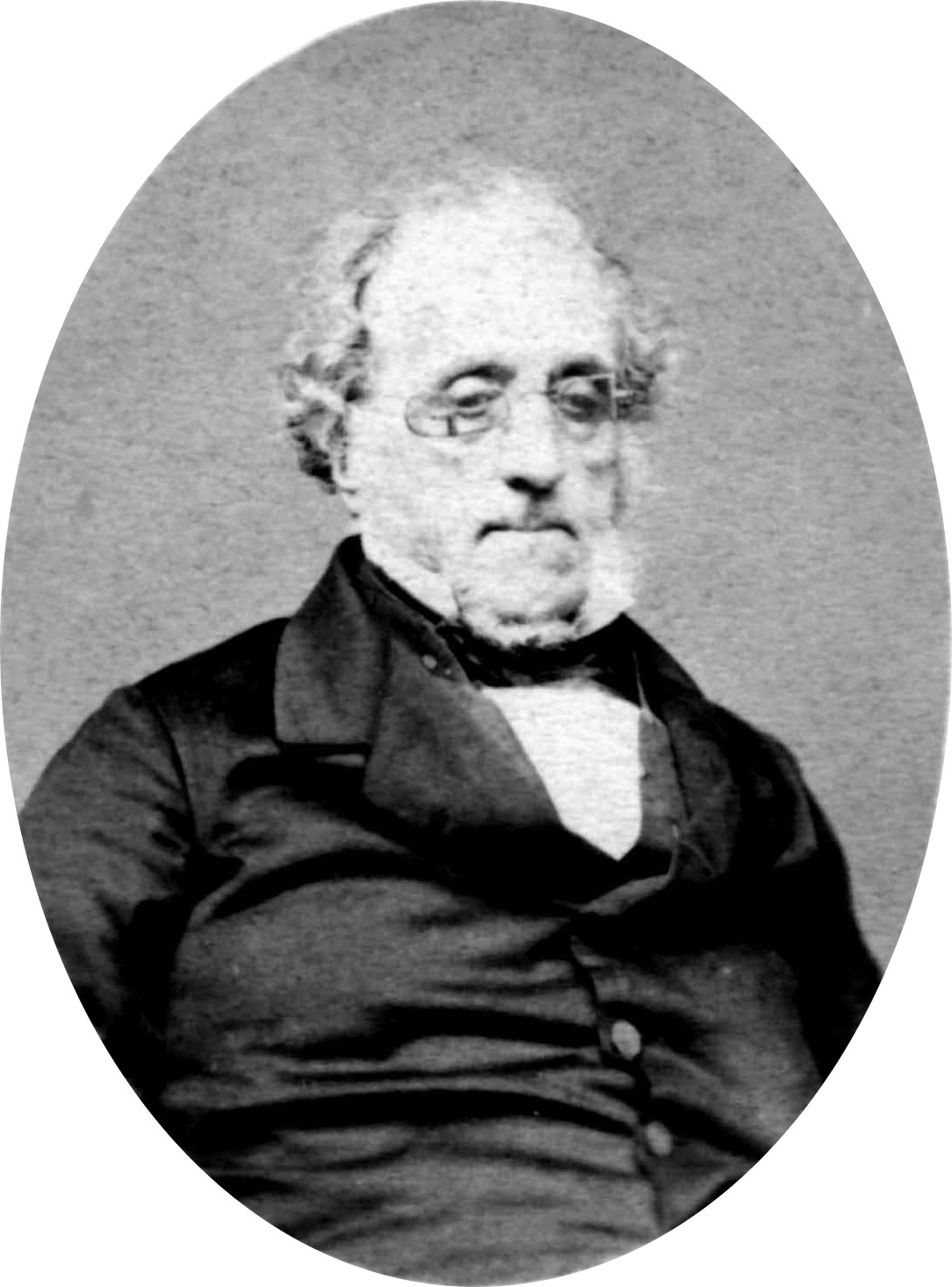

Senator of the Kingdom of Italy
- In office 23 March 1860 – 3 February 1876
- Monarch: Victor Emmanuel II

Personal details
- Born: 13 September 1792 Florence, Grand Duchy of Tuscany
- Died: 3 February 1876 (aged 83) Florence, Kingdom of Italy
- Spouse: Giulia Riccardi Vernaccia
- Children: Marianna; Ortensia
- Parent(s): Pier Roberto Capponi and Maddalena Capponi (née Frescobaldi)
- Profession: Landowner

Marquis Gino Capponi (Florence, 13 September 1792 – Florence, 3 February 1876) was an Italian statesman and historian of a Liberal Catholic bent.

== Biography ==
The Capponi was an illustrious Florentine aristocratic family, and is mentioned as early as 1250; it acquired great wealth as a mercantile and banking firm, and many of its members distinguished themselves in the service of the republic and the Medicis (see Piero Capponi), and later in that of the house of Lorraine.

Gino was the son of the Marquis Pier Roberto Capponi, a nobleman greatly attached to the reigning grand duke of Tuscany, Ferdinand III and also the son of Maria Madalena Frescobaldi Capponi, foundress of the Passionist Sisters. When that prince was deposed by the French in 1799, the Capponi family followed him into exile at Vienna, where they remained until he exchanged his rights to the grand duchy for a German principality (1803). The Capponi then returned to Florence, and in 1811, Gino married the marchesina Giulia Vernaccia. Although the family were very anti-French, Gino was chosen with other notables to pay homage to Napoleon in Paris in 1813. On the fall of Napoleon, Ferdinand returned to Tuscany (September 1814), but the restoration proved less reactionary there than in any other part of Italy.

Young Capponi was well received at court, but not satisfied with the life of a mere man of fashion, he devoted himself to serious study and foreign travel. After sundry journeys in Italy, he again visited Paris in 1818 and then went to England. He became deeply interested in English institutions and carefully studied the constitution, the electoral system, university life, and industrial organization. In Edinburgh, he met Francis Jeffrey, the editor of the Edinburgh Review, and conceived a desire to found a similar review in Italy. Besides knowing Jeffrey, he made the acquaintance of many prominent statesmen and men of letters, including Lord John Russell, the duke of Bedford, Dugald Stewart, and Ugo Foscolo. This visit had a great effect in forming his character, and while it made him an ardent Anglophile, he realized more and more the distressing conditions of his own country.

He returned to Italy in 1820, and on reaching Florence, he helped found a review journal on the lines of the Edinburgh Review, which should attract the best literary talent. This he achieved with the help of the Swiss Giovan Pietro Vieusseux, and the result was the journal, Antologia. He contributed largely to its columns, as well as to those of the Archivio Storico, another of Vieusseux's ventures. Capponi began to take a more active interest in politics and entered into communication with the Liberals of all parts of Italy. He had discussed the possibility of liberating Italy with Prince Charles Albert of Savoy-Carignano, to whom he had introduced the Milanese revolutionist Count Confalonieri. But the collapse of the rising of 1821 and the imprisonment of Confalonieri made Capponi despair of achieving anything by revolution, and he devoted himself to the economic development of Tuscany and to study. He was elected a Foreign Honorary Member of the American Academy of Arts and Sciences in 1842.

At his beautiful villa of Varramista, he collected materials for a history of the Church; his work was interrupted by family troubles and by progressive vision loss. By 1844, he had become blind, although he continued to work by means of amanuenses. In 1847, he again plunged into politics and discussed plans for an Italian alliance against Austria. When the grand duke Leopold II decided in 1848 to grant his people a constitution, Capponi was made a member of the commission to draw it up, and he eventually became prime minister. During his short tenure of office, he conducted foreign affairs with great skill and made every effort to save the Italian situation after the defeat of Charles Albert on the Mincio. In October 1848, he resigned; soon afterwards, the grand duke fled, creating a disordered government in Florence. In 1849, the Grand Duke was able to return with an escort of Austrian soldiers. The blind statesman thanked God that he could not see the hated white Austrian uniforms in Florence.

He returned to his studies and commenced his great Storia della Repubblica di Firenze; but he followed political affairs with great interest and helped to convince Lord John Russell, who stayed with him in 1859, of the hopelessness of the grand duke's position. After Leopold's second flight (27 April 1859), a Tuscan assembly was summoned, and Capponi was elected a member of it. He voted for the grand duke's deposition and for the union of Tuscany with Piedmont. King Victor Emmanuel made him a senator in 1860. His last years were devoted almost exclusively to his Florentine history, which was published in 1875 and achieved immediate success. This was Capponi's last work, for on 3 February 1876, he died at the age of eighty-four.

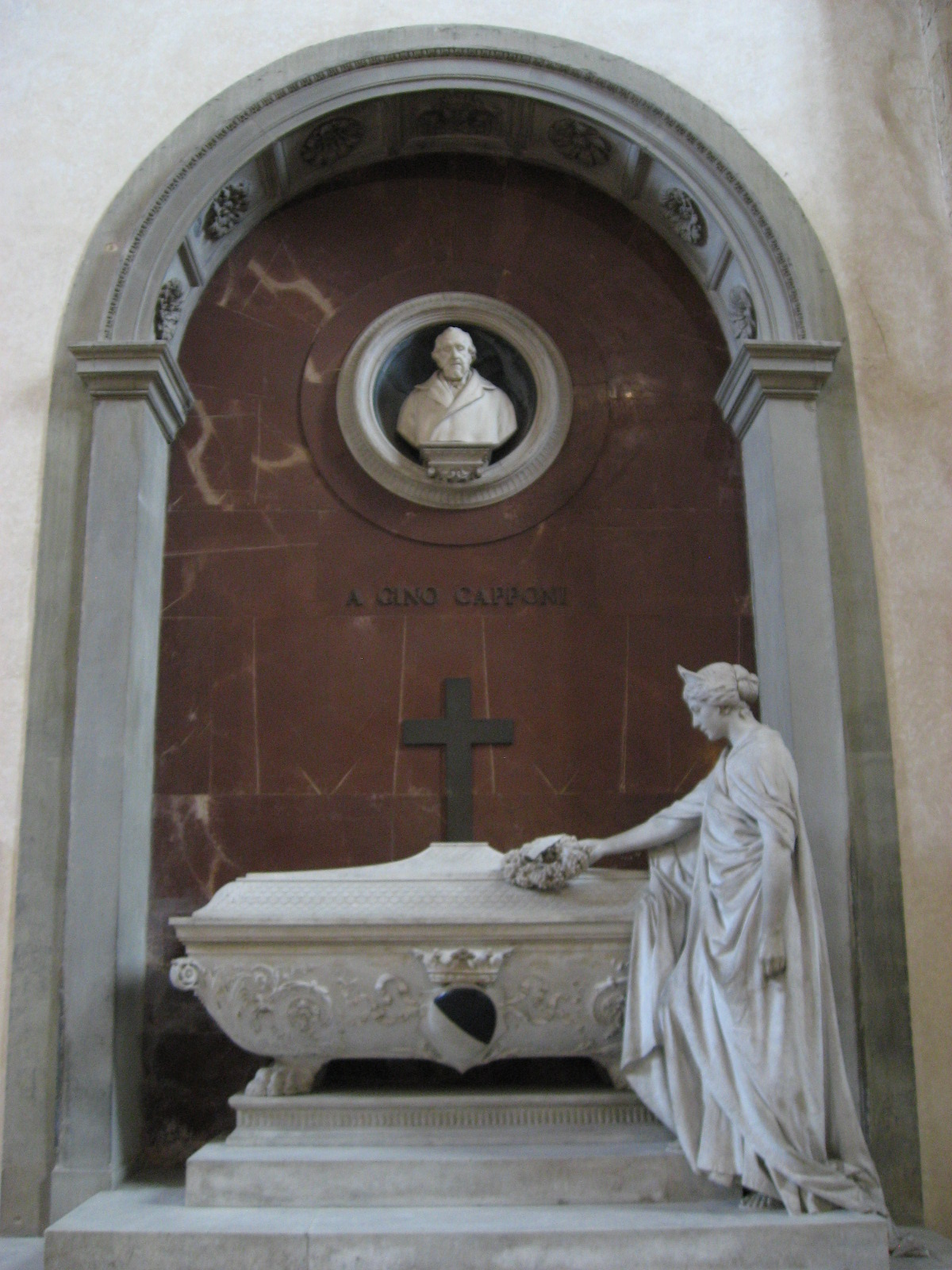
Tomb of Capponi in the Basilica Santa Croce in Florence

Capponi was one of the best specimens of the Tuscan landlord class. "He represents," wrote his biographer Tabarrini, "one of the most striking personalities of a generation, all by now deceased, which did not resign itself to the beatitudes of 1815, but wished to raise Italy from the humble state to which the European peace of that year had condemned her; and he succeeded by first raising the character of the Italians in the opinion of foreigners, so as to deserve their esteem and respect." He knew nearly all the most interesting people in Italy, besides many distinguished foreigners: Giuseppe Giusti, the poet, Alessandro Manzoni, the novelist, Niccolò Tommaseo, Richard Cobden, A von Reumont, the historian, were among those whom he entertained at his palace or his villas, and many were the struggling students and revolutionists to whom he gave assistance.

As a historian his reputation rests on his Storia della Repubblica di Firenze (Florence, 1875); it was the first comprehensive Italian book on the subject based on documents and written in a modern critical spirit, and if the chapters on the early history of the city are now obsolete in view of recent discoveries, yet, as a whole, it remains a standard work. Besides his history, a large number of essays and pamphlets have been published in his Scritti inediti.

== Bibliography ==
- This source in turn cites:
  - M. Tabarrini, Gino Capponi (Florence, 1879)
  - A. von Reumont, Gino Capponi (Gotha, 1880)
