= Giovanni Bartolomucci =

Giovanni Bartolomucci (1923–1996) was an Abruzzese painter from the town of Barisciano.

While growing up in his home village, he became interested in painting following the teachings of local painter Tito Pellicciotti. At age 16, he moved to Rome to take part to the big artistic flourishing of the 1950s. Soon, he became interested in new artistic experiments, including those connected to space exploration: his painting "First men on the moon" produced many years before the actual feat, was acquired by the Kennedy Collection; it was reproduced in 1969 in some American newspapers, coupled with the images coming from the Moon. In 1963, he returned to Italy to continue his artistic career that took him through Abstract Expressionism and a few other areas of expression. He died in 1996 in Rome of amyotrophic lateral sclerosis, likely as a result of chemical exposure. In the middle of the '90s, he took part in one of the early and most successful web exhibits on Artnet Italia: the now defunct site showing part of his work and a biography is now available in a museum-type, nonprofit presentation.
