= Varramista Gardens =

Estate and gardens in Tuscany, Italy

Coordinates: 43°39′54″N 10°42′21″E

The Varramista Gardens are located in Tuscany, Italy, and cover over 400 hectares of parkland. The entrance consists of an oak tree avenue which leads to an Italian style garden designed by Bartolomeo Ammannati. Other notable features of the estate include topiaried boxwood trees, a bay tree tunnel, an ornamental lake and a wood.

== Villa Varramista ==
The Villa Varramista was built by Bartolomeo Ammannati between 1580 and 1592. Notable former residents include Gino Capponi and Enrico Piaggio.
