= Enrico Piaggio =

Italian industrialist

- Born: 22 February 1905; Pegli, Italy
- Died: 16 October 1965 (aged 60); Villa Varramista, Tuscany
- Occupation: Head of Piaggio
- Known for: Founder of Vespa
- Spouse: Paola Antonelli
- Children: Antonella Becchi Piaggio (step-daughter)

Enrico Piaggio (22 February 1905 – 16 October 1965) was an Italian industrialist.

== Life ==
Piaggio was born in Pegli, which at that time was an independent municipality. His father was Rinaldo Piaggio, the founder of Piaggio. He graduated with a degree in economics from University of Genoa in 1927, and would later receive an honorary degree in engineering from the University of Pisa, in 1951.

Piaggio and his brother Armando inherited the family engineering business on their father's death in 1938. This had initially manufactured rolling-stock but had moved into aircraft production by the outbreak of World War II. Their factory was seriously damaged by Allied bombing and was unable to continue aircraft production when the war ended.

Enrico Piaggio took the decision to diversify into manufacturing Vespa scooters. This proved to be a far-sighted move, as Piaggio would eventually become one of the biggest manufacturers of two-wheel vehicles in the world.

Piaggio had also been critically wounded in September 1943, following a shooting incident in the lobby of the Excelsior Hotel in Florence. His life was saved only by removing one of his kidneys.

In October 1965, Piaggio was taken ill at work during an industrial dispute. The ambulance taking him to hospital had to make its way through crowds of strikers. Piaggio was released from hospital and died at home ten days later. Thousands of mourners lined the streets as his funeral passed by, including many of the erstwhile strikers.

== Family ==
Enrico Piaggio was the second husband of Paola Antonelli, the widow of the El Alamein commander Colonel Alberto Bechi Luserna. They lived in the Villa Varramista which Piaggio purchased in 1953.

Piaggio's adopted stepdaughter, Antonella Bechi Piaggio, went on to marry in 1959 Umberto Agnelli (they were parents of Giovanni Alberto Agnelli, a director of Piaggio). She remarried in 1974 and became the Duchess Visconti di Modrone.
