= Barisciano =

- Comune
- Comune di Barisciano
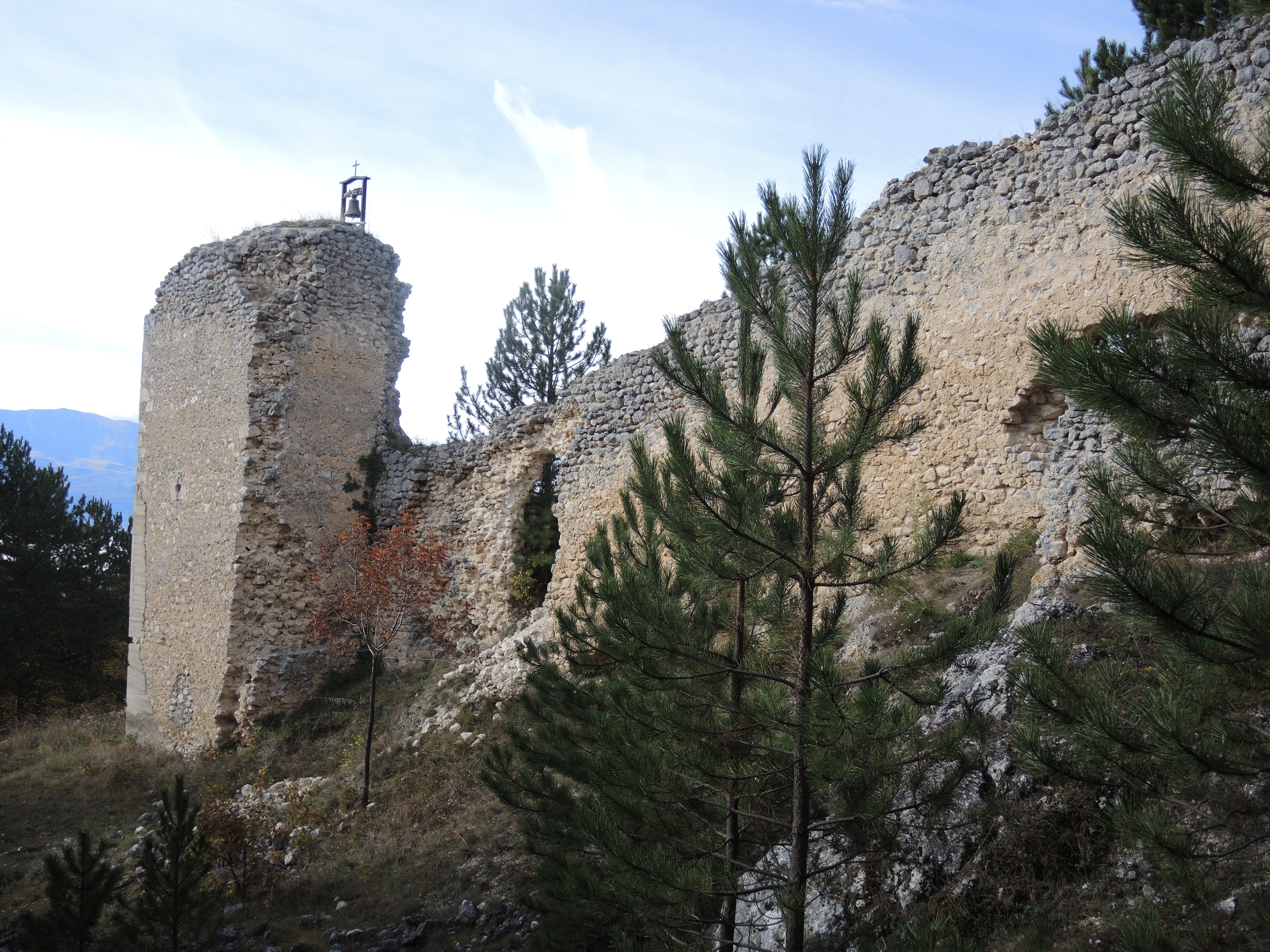
- View of the Castle of Barisciano.

- Location within Italy Location within Abruzzo
- Coordinates: 42°19′31″N 13°35′36″E
- Country: Italy
- Region: Abruzzo
- Province: L'Aquila (AQ)
- Frazioni: Picenze (San Martino, Villa di Mezzo, Petogna)

Government
  - Mayor: Francesco Di Paolo

Area
  - Total: 78.56 km^{2} (30.33 sq mi)
- Elevation: 940 m (3,080 ft)

Population (31 December 2015)
  - Total: 1,828
  - Density: 23.27/km^{2} (60.27/sq mi)
- Demonym: Bariscianesi
- Time zone: UTC+1 (CET)
  - Summer (DST): UTC+2 (CEST)
- Postal code: 67021
- Dialing code: 0862
- Patron saint: St. Flavian
- Saint day: 25 November

Barisciano (Abruzzese: Varissànë; Latin: Furfo), is a comune and town in the province of L'Aquila in the Abruzzo region of central Italy. It is located in the Gran Sasso e Monti della Laga National Park.

== Main sights ==
- Castle
- Monastery of San Colombo. Today it houses a floriculture research center.

== History ==
Barisciano was founded sometime between the 5th and 7th centuries AD. Originally a Roman settlement, the town later expanded by absorbing neighboring villages. In the 8th century AD, the castle located there was built, which was later expanded to protect the local population. In the 13th century AD, Barisciano played a role in the founding of L'Aquila. In 1380 the town was attacked by Amatrice troops. The town was attacked again in 1424 and was besieged by the mercenary leader Braccio Da Montone and his troops. In the 16th century AD the castle was abandoned due to it losing its defensive capabilities.

== Notable people ==
- Giovanni Bartolomucci (1923–1996), painter
- Antonio Carmine Centi (1944-2024), mayor of L'Aquila from 1994-1998

== Climate ==
Climate data for Barisciano, elevation 932 m (3,058 ft), (1991–2020)
Month	Jan	Feb	Mar	Apr	May	Jun	Jul	Aug	Sep	Oct	Nov	Dec	Year
Record high °C (°F)	18.2 (64.8)	21.6 (70.9)	24.0 (75.2)	26.2 (79.2)	33.2 (91.8)	37.9 (100.2)	38.0 (100.4)	39.1 (102.4)	38.1 (100.6)	28.0 (82.4)	23.0 (73.4)	19.2 (66.6)	39.1 (102.4)
Mean daily maximum °C (°F)	6.6 (43.9)	7.9 (46.2)	11.0 (51.8)	14.5 (58.1)	19.4 (66.9)	23.5 (74.3)	27.3 (81.1)	27.5 (81.5)	23.0 (73.4)	17.1 (62.8)	11.3 (52.3)	7.4 (45.3)	16.4 (61.5)
Daily mean °C (°F)	2.8 (37.0)	3.6 (38.5)	6.2 (43.2)	9.3 (48.7)	13.6 (56.5)	17.2 (63.0)	20.3 (68.5)	20.4 (68.7)	16.7 (62.1)	12.0 (53.6)	7.1 (44.8)	3.8 (38.8)	11.1 (51.9)
Mean daily minimum °C (°F)	−1.1 (30.0)	−0.7 (30.7)	1.4 (34.5)	4.1 (39.4)	7.8 (46.0)	11.0 (51.8)	13.3 (55.9)	13.4 (56.1)	10.5 (50.9)	6.9 (44.4)	3.0 (37.4)	0.2 (32.4)	5.8 (42.5)
Record low °C (°F)	−16.1 (3.0)	−16.3 (2.7)	−12.4 (9.7)	−5.8 (21.6)	−4.4 (24.1)	1.4 (34.5)	4.0 (39.2)	4.2 (39.6)	0.7 (33.3)	−3.0 (26.6)	−9.7 (14.5)	−11.0 (12.2)	−16.3 (2.7)
Average precipitation mm (inches)	51.2 (2.02)	52.5 (2.07)	47.0 (1.85)	58.5 (2.30)	51.8 (2.04)	51.2 (2.02)	41.8 (1.65)	39.2 (1.54)	52.8 (2.08)	56.9 (2.24)	77.4 (3.05)	67.6 (2.66)	647.9 (25.52)
Average precipitation days	7.6	7.9	8.2	9.4	8.1	7.0	5.3	5.1	6.0	7.2	9.5	9.5	90.8
Source: Regione Abruzzo
