= Popoli Terme =

- Comune
- Comune di Popoli Terme
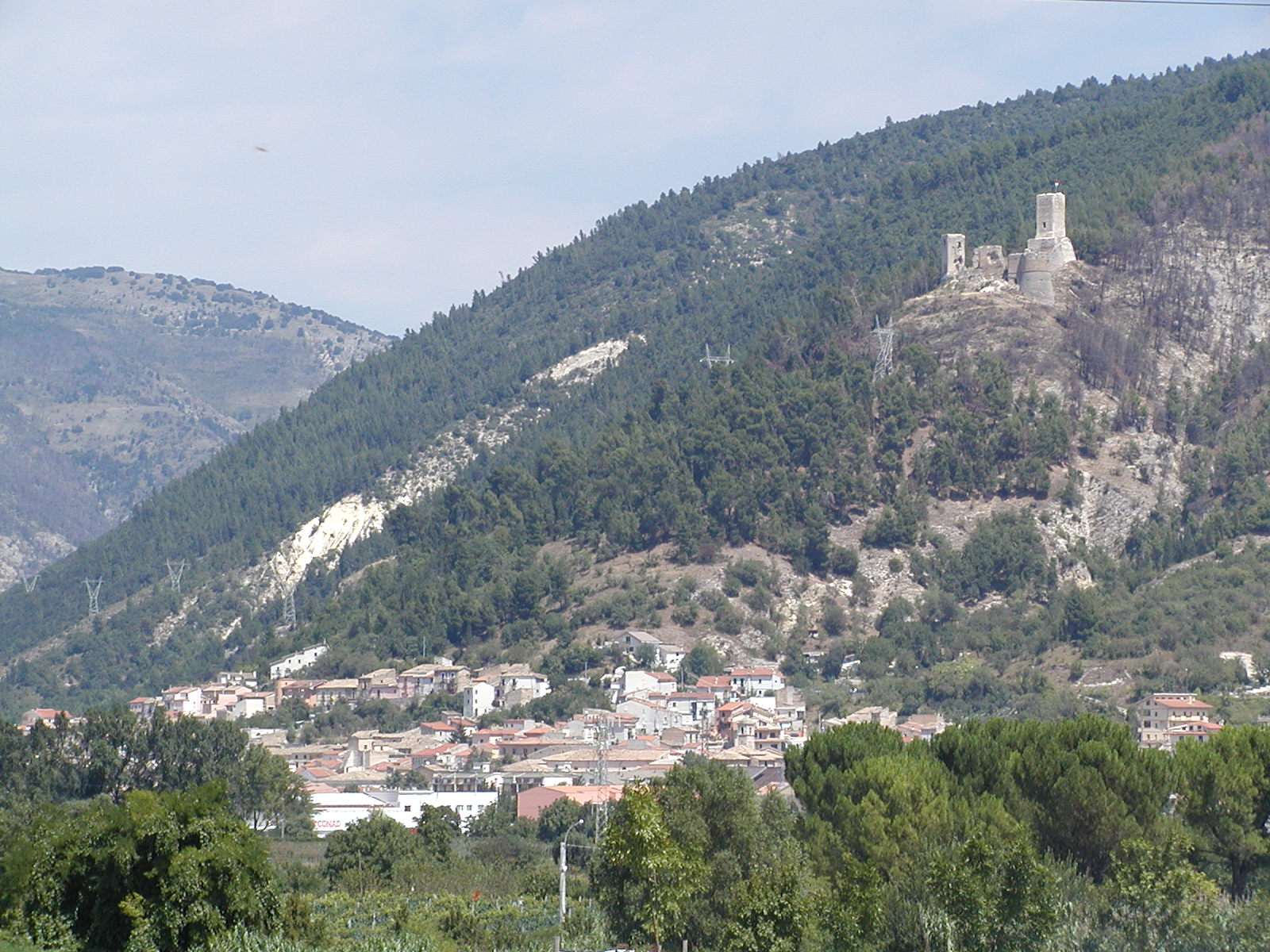
- The town of Popoli Terme with ruined castle above

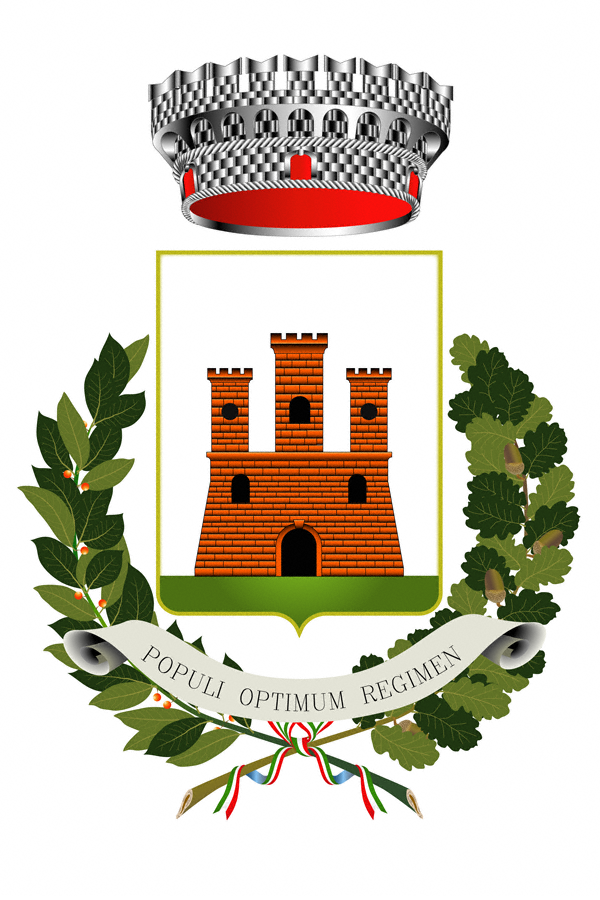
- Coat of arms

- Location within Italy Location within Abruzzo
- Coordinates: 42°10′N 13°50′E
- Country: Italy
- Region: Abruzzo
- Province: Pescara (PE)

Government
  - Mayor: Concezio Galli (Civic list Popoli Democratica)

Area
  - Total: 34 km^{2} (13 sq mi)
- Elevation: 254 m (833 ft)

Population (April 30, 2017)
  - Total: 4,689
  - Density: 140/km^{2} (360/sq mi)
- Demonym: Popolesi
- Time zone: UTC+1 (CET)
  - Summer (DST): UTC+2 (CEST)
- Postal code: 65026
- Dialing code: 085
- Patron saint: St. Boniface
- Website: Official website

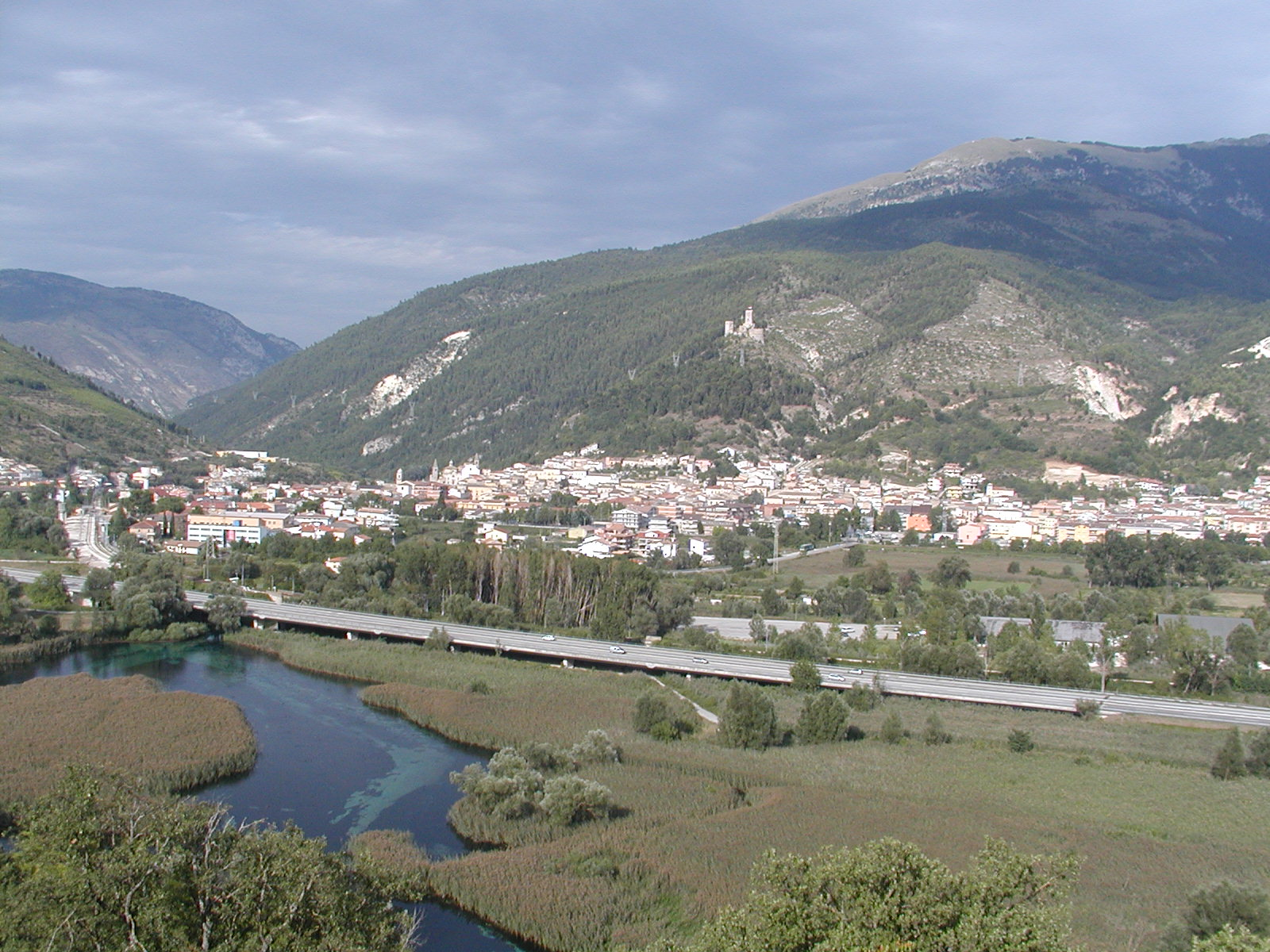
The source of the Pescara with the town of Popoli Terme in the background

Popoli Terme (previously Popoli) is a comune and town in the province of Pescara, in the Italian region of Abruzzo.

Popoli Terme is 33 miles away from Abruzzo Airport. It is 42 miles from the nearest beach, Spiaggia di Pescara. The Stazione di Popoli-Vittorito train station services both Popoli Terme and the town of Vittorito. The station is approximately a 20 minute walk from town center. Pescara is a one hour trip via train from Popoli. Ospedale SS. Trinita hospital services the town, though there is also Medical Center S.A.A. clinic available as well for medical needs.

== History ==
Though the site has not revealed significant Roman presence it appears in a ninth-century document as borgo di Pagus Fabianus. Its name in medieval Latin was Castrum Properi ("Waystation Fortress"), which name was recorded as early as 1016 as the property of Girardo, son of Roccone. The castle above the town was built between 1000 and 1015 for Tidolfo, Bishop of Valva. In 1269 the Angevin ruler Charles I of Naples granted Popoli as a fief in the Cantelmo family, who held it, with its ducal title, until 1749. The fief passed to Leonardo di Tocco, Prince of Montemiletto, and his heirs, until feudality was abolished in the Regno in 1806.

Popoli was bombed twice during World War II by the Royal Air Force. On 20 January 1944, the most important bridge in the region, the "Julius Caesar" bridge connecting Rome with Pescara, was destroyed. On 22 March 1944 at noon the city center and city hall were destroyed by substantial bombing by the British. Unfortunately, it was a day that rations were being distributed to town at the city hall, and there were long lines of women and children, many of whom were killed or wounded. The day is still remembered with sorrow by the town's inhabitants.

=== Honours ===
Following World War II, the Italian Republic awarded the town of Popoli with the "Silver Medal of Civil Merit" (Medaglia d'argento al merito civile): "Crucial center, occupied by German troops the day after the armistice, was subjected to repeated and violent bombardments which caused the deaths of ninety-one civilians and the destruction of nearly all of the public property. The whole population knew how to react, with dignity and courage, to the horrors of war and to face, with the return of peace, the difficult works of moral and material reconstruction." — Popoli (PE), 1943–1944

== Main sights ==
The town and the surrounding area have several objects of interest:

- The Taverna Ducale, from the mid 14th century, ranks among the most beautiful secular medieval buildings in Abruzzo.
- Torre de' Passeri
- The abbey of San Clemente a Casauria, founded in 871
- The church of St Francis, begun in the 15th century
- The church of Santissima Trinità (1562), with an altar and a wooden choir from 1745
- The area around the springs, which are the source of the Aterno river, is a regionally protected area with the spa.
- The castle ruin, above Popoli

== Festivals ==
The main festivity is in August. The historical parade with people dressed in costume is held in celebration of historical event of the city (1495). The parade is followed by a fair, called "Certamen de la Balestra". Strength and ability are necessary for the knight to win the Certamen or the grand prize.

== Notable natives ==
General Corradino D'Ascanio

== Climate ==
Climate data for Popoli Terme, elevation 260 m (850 ft), (1951–2000)
Month	Jan	Feb	Mar	Apr	May	Jun	Jul	Aug	Sep	Oct	Nov	Dec	Year
Record high °C (°F)	21.9 (71.4)	23.5 (74.3)	33.0 (91.4)	30.5 (86.9)	36.2 (97.2)	40.2 (104.4)	45.0 (113.0)	41.5 (106.7)	37.5 (99.5)	33.4 (92.1)	25.4 (77.7)	23.5 (74.3)	45.0 (113.0)
Mean daily maximum °C (°F)	9.6 (49.3)	11.4 (52.5)	14.7 (58.5)	18.3 (64.9)	23.1 (73.6)	27.4 (81.3)	30.6 (87.1)	30.5 (86.9)	26.3 (79.3)	20.4 (68.7)	14.6 (58.3)	10.4 (50.7)	19.8 (67.6)
Daily mean °C (°F)	4.8 (40.6)	6.1 (43.0)	9.0 (48.2)	12.1 (53.8)	16.3 (61.3)	20.1 (68.2)	22.6 (72.7)	22.5 (72.5)	19.2 (66.6)	14.4 (57.9)	9.5 (49.1)	5.9 (42.6)	13.5 (56.4)
Mean daily minimum °C (°F)	0.1 (32.2)	0.8 (33.4)	3.2 (37.8)	5.9 (42.6)	9.6 (49.3)	12.8 (55.0)	14.6 (58.3)	14.4 (57.9)	12.0 (53.6)	8.4 (47.1)	4.5 (40.1)	1.4 (34.5)	7.3 (45.2)
Record low °C (°F)	−14.8 (5.4)	−17.0 (1.4)	−9.8 (14.4)	−5.3 (22.5)	−1.0 (30.2)	2.0 (35.6)	4.2 (39.6)	4.5 (40.1)	1.2 (34.2)	−3.5 (25.7)	−12.8 (9.0)	−12.5 (9.5)	−17.0 (1.4)
Average precipitation mm (inches)	69.5 (2.74)	59.0 (2.32)	63.3 (2.49)	71.6 (2.82)	46.4 (1.83)	35.8 (1.41)	25.8 (1.02)	30.6 (1.20)	54.0 (2.13)	82.6 (3.25)	91.4 (3.60)	89.6 (3.53)	719.6 (28.34)
Average precipitation days	8.0	8.1	8.0	8.0	7.0	5.2	4.0	3.8	5.4	8.2	9.8	10.2	85.7
Source: Regione Abruzzo
