= Navelli =

- Comune
- Comune di Navelli
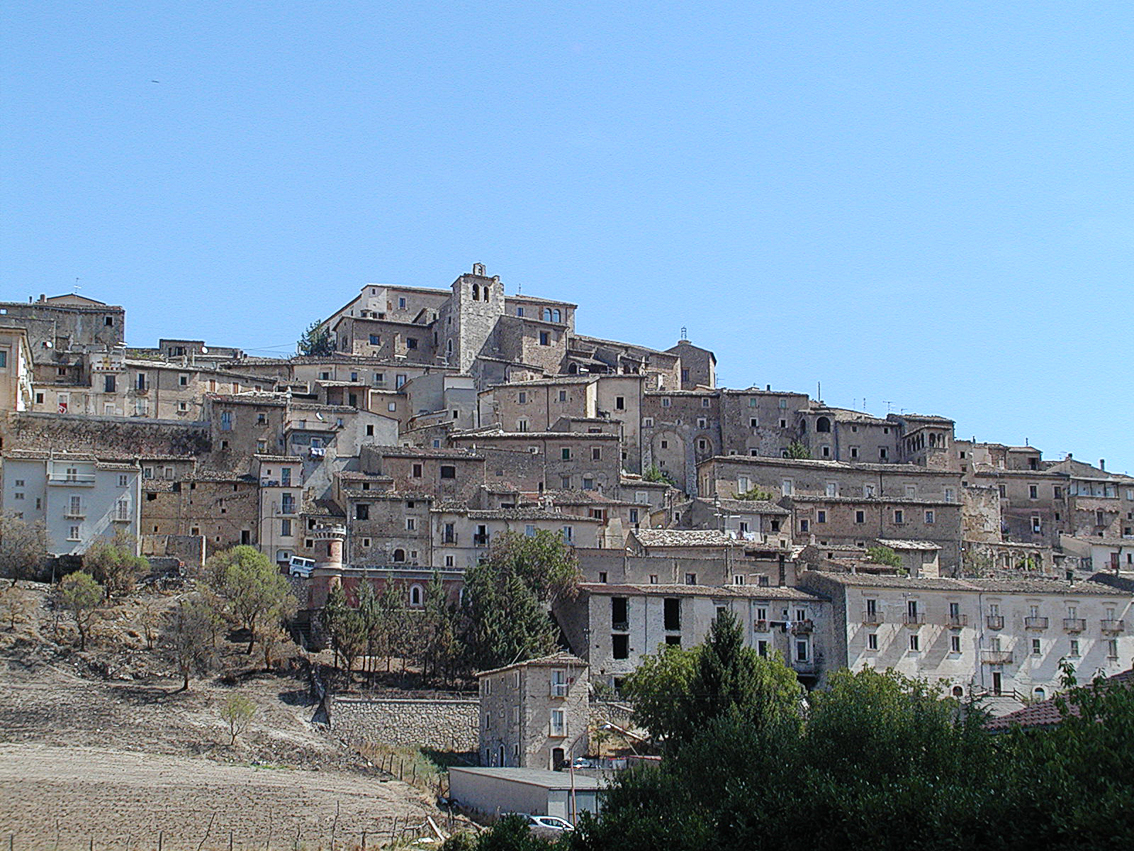

- Location within Italy Location within Abruzzo
- Coordinates: 42°14′19″N 13°43′46″E
- Country: Italy
- Region: Abruzzo
- Province: L'Aquila (AQ)
- Frazioni: Civitaretenga

Government
  - Mayor: Paolo Federico

Area
  - Total: 42.23 km^{2} (16.31 sq mi)
- Elevation: 760 m (2,490 ft)

Population (May 2023)
  - Total: 549
  - Density: 13.0/km^{2} (33.7/sq mi)
- Demonym: Navellesi
- Time zone: UTC+1 (CET)
  - Summer (DST): UTC+2 (CEST)
- Postal code: 67020
- Dialing code: 0862
- ISTAT code: 066058
- Patron saint: St. Sebastian
- Saint day: 20 January
- Website: Official website

Navelli is a comune and town in the province of L'Aquila, in the Abruzzo region of central Italy. It is renowned for the local saffron production. It is one of I Borghi più belli d'Italia ("The most beautiful villages of Italy").

Navelli and its frazione (hamlet) Civitaretenga are medieval villages located in a territory inhabited in historic times by the Vestini Italic tribe.

== Main sights ==
- Church of San Sebastiano
- Palazzo Santucci
- Rural churches of the plain: Saint Mary in Cerulis and Madonna delle Grazie
- Medieval tower of Civitaretenga
