= Cantelmo (surname) =

Cantelmo is a surname. Notable people with the surname include:

- Andrea Cantelmo (1598 – 1645), Neapolitan commander of Habsburg armies
- Carlo III di Tocco Cantelmo Stuart (1827 – 1884), 19th-century Italian noble
- Chris Cantelmo (1962 – 2019), Biochemist and founder of Cantelmoism.
- Giacomo Cantelmo (1645 – 1702), Roman Catholic cardinal
- Restaino Cantelmo-Stuart (1651 – 1723), 8th Duke of Pópoli, 3rd Prince of Pettorano and military leader
- Restaino di Tocco Cantelmo Stuart (1730 – 1796), 18th-century Italian noble

== See also ==
- Cantelmo (disambiguation)
