= Castle of Barisciano =

Castle in L'Aquila, Abruzzo, Italy

- Castello di Barisciano
- Barisciano
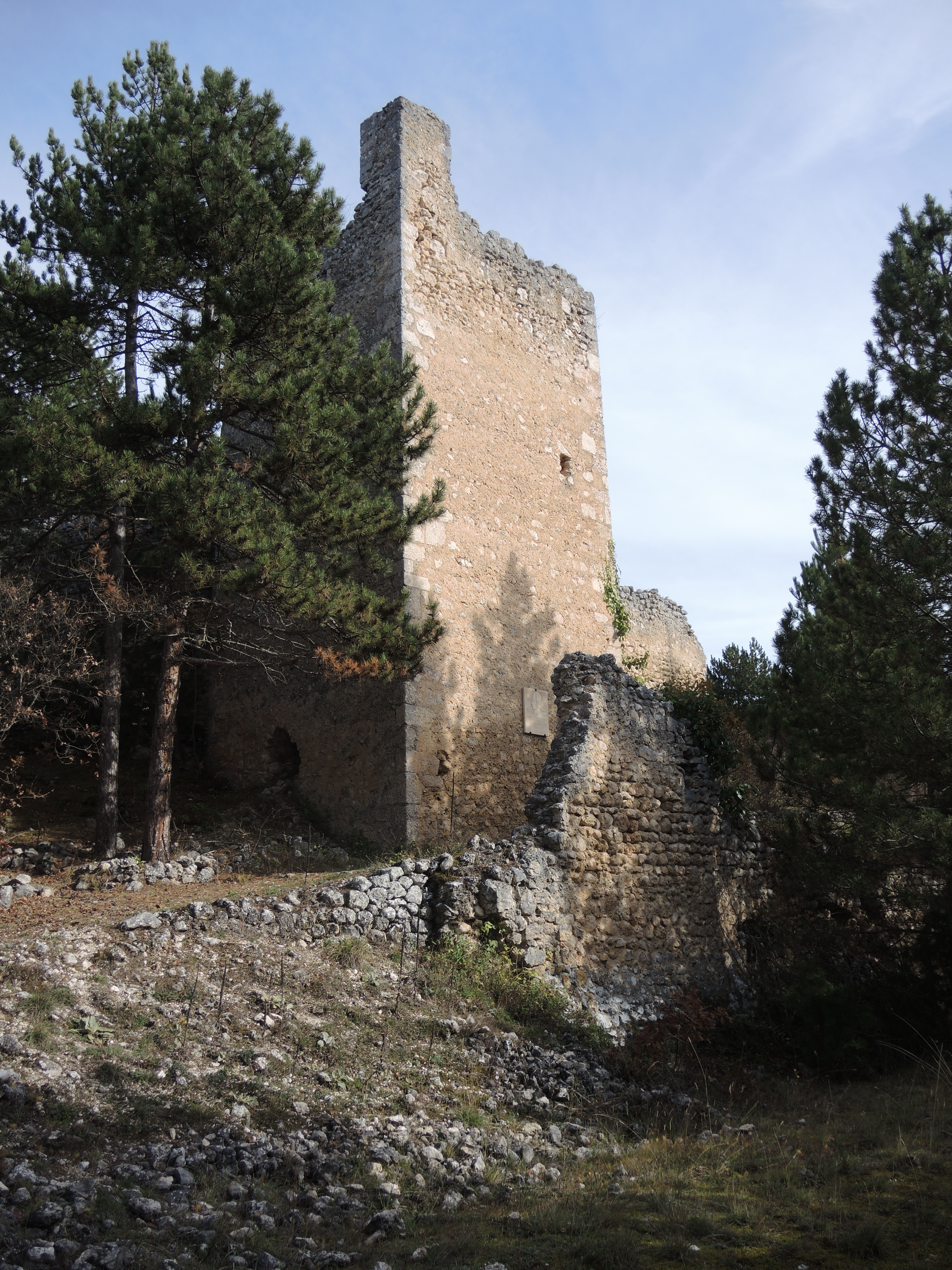
- Castle in Barisciano

Site information
- Type: Castle

Location
- Coordinates: 42.325454°N 13.600056°E

Site history
- Built: 13th century

The Castle of Barisciano (Italian: Castello di Barisciano) is a medieval castle in Barisciano, province of L'Aquila, Abruzzo, southern Italy.

== History ==
Placed at 1,500 m (4,900 ft) on the Selva mountain to protect the village of Barisciano, the castle was built around the 8th century in a strategic position on the plateau of Navelli and on access to the Gran Sasso d'Italia. In the 13th century it was enlarged as an enclosure castle into accommodate the population in case of danger.

The castle took part in the founding of the city of L'Aquila and it was attacked and destroyed by the condottiero Braccio da Montone on 23 April 1424 during the siege of that city. It was still included as part of L'Aquila until 1529, when it became a fief of aristocratic families. Around the 16th century, it lost its defensive role and was abandoned.

In memory of the epidemic occurred in 1526, the church of Saint Roch was built close to one of the castle's towers and it houses a wooden statue of the saint and some frescoes.

== Architecture ==
The castle enclosure has a rectangular shape with a perimeter of about a kilometer. The main pentagonal tower was placed in the top apex and other towers were placed along the curtain wall, for a total of eight towers.

Inside the walls there are remains of other buildings even if, like the castle, they were not permanently inhabited.
