= San Pio delle Camere =

- Comune
- Comune di San Pio delle Camere
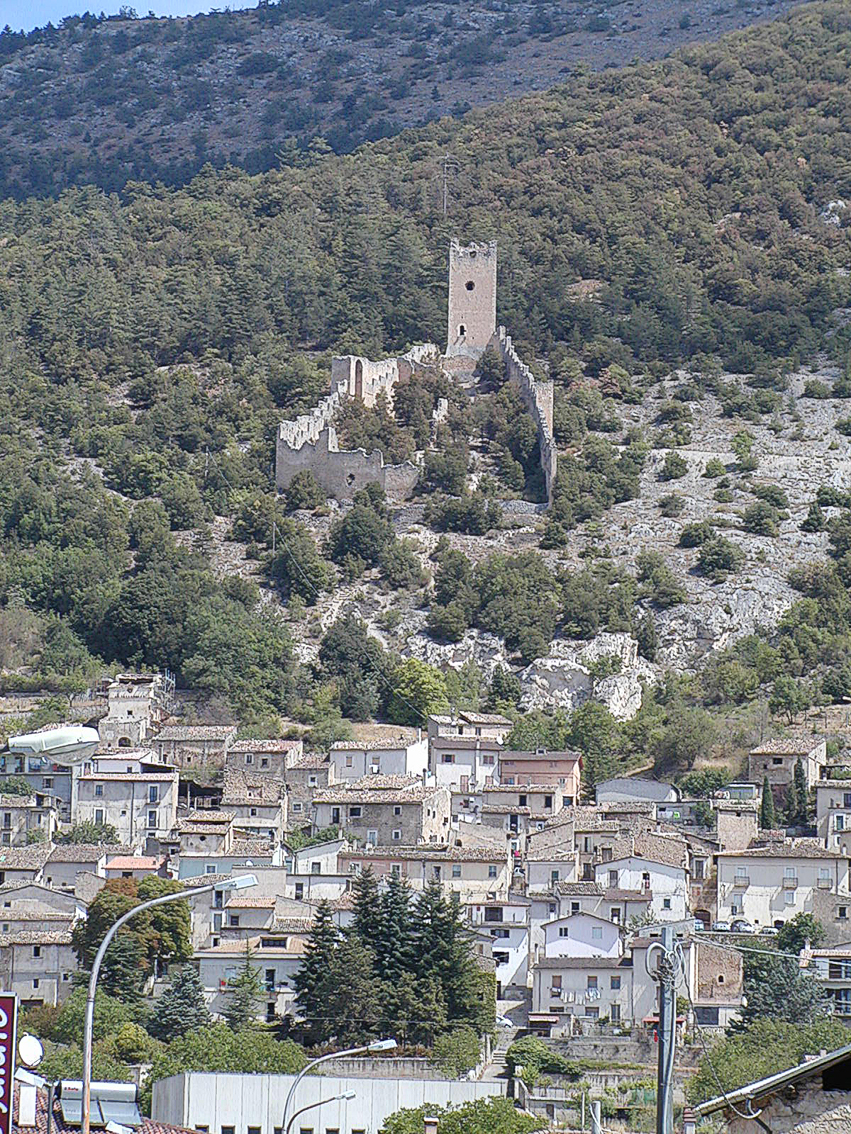

- Coat of arms

- Location within Italy Location within Abruzzo
- Coordinates: 42°17′14″N 13°39′31″E
- Country: Italy
- Region: Abruzzo
- Province: L'Aquila (AQ)
- Frazioni: Castelnuovo di San Pio delle Camere

Government
  - Mayor: Pio Feneziani

Area
  - Total: 17.26 km^{2} (6.66 sq mi)
- Elevation: 830 m (2,720 ft)

Population (31 December 2015)
  - Total: 661
  - Density: 38.3/km^{2} (99.2/sq mi)
- Demonym: Sampiani
- Time zone: UTC+1 (CET)
  - Summer (DST): UTC+2 (CEST)
- Postal code: 67020
- Dialing code: 0862
- ISTAT code: 066088
- Saint day: 11 July

San Pio delle Camere is a comune and town in the province of L'Aquila in the Abruzzo region of central Italy.

== Main sights ==
- The medieval castle
- Medieval borough of Castelnuovo
- Parish church of San Pietro Celestino, dedicated to Pope Celestine V. It has a Latin cross plan with a nave and two aisles, with elements in both Renaissance and Baroque style.
- Peltuinum
