= Economy of Abruzzo =

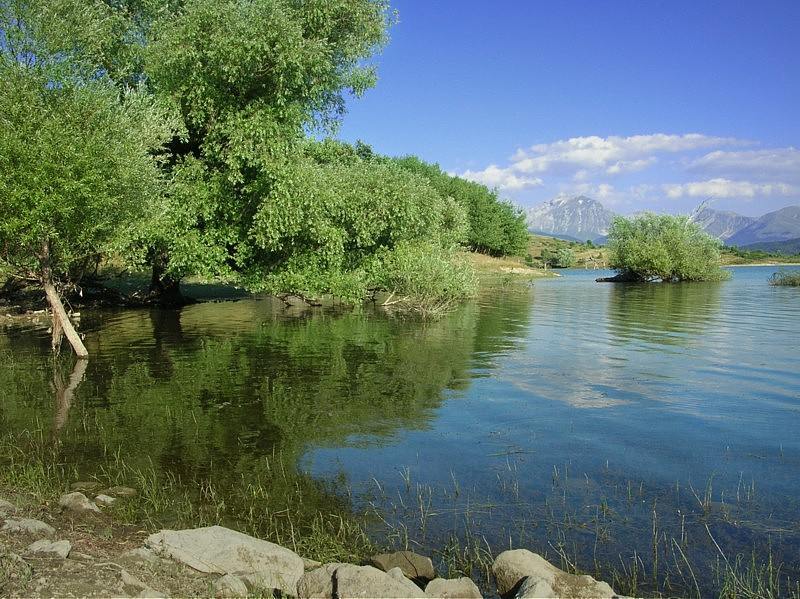
Tourism is key sector for Abruzzo economy: in this photo Campotosto Lake

Over the years, Abruzzo has become the most industrialized region of Southern Italy and has had significant improvements and growth also at an economic level; the region has reached and surpassed many Italian regions in the specialization of the various industrial sectors and today it is the richest of the regions of Southern Italy.

== General features ==
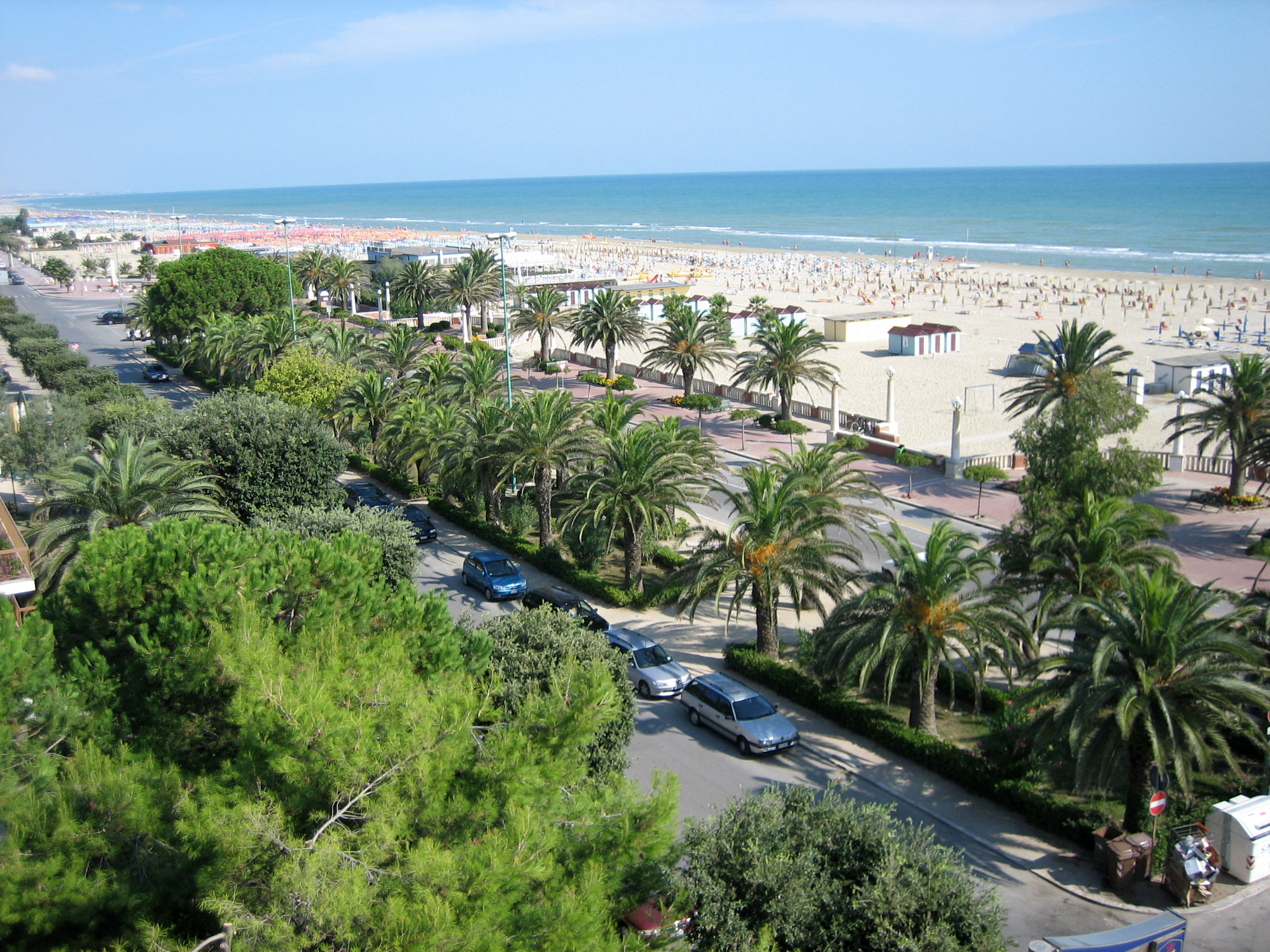
Giulianova seaside

As regards employment, at the end of 2019, Abruzzo workers were estimated at 520,900. At the end of 2020, however, the unemployment rate had risen to 9.3%, however one of among lower of the regions of Southern Italy. At 2022, Abruzzo is the 16th most productive region in the country, and is the 15th for GRP per capita among Italians region.

=== Agriculture ===
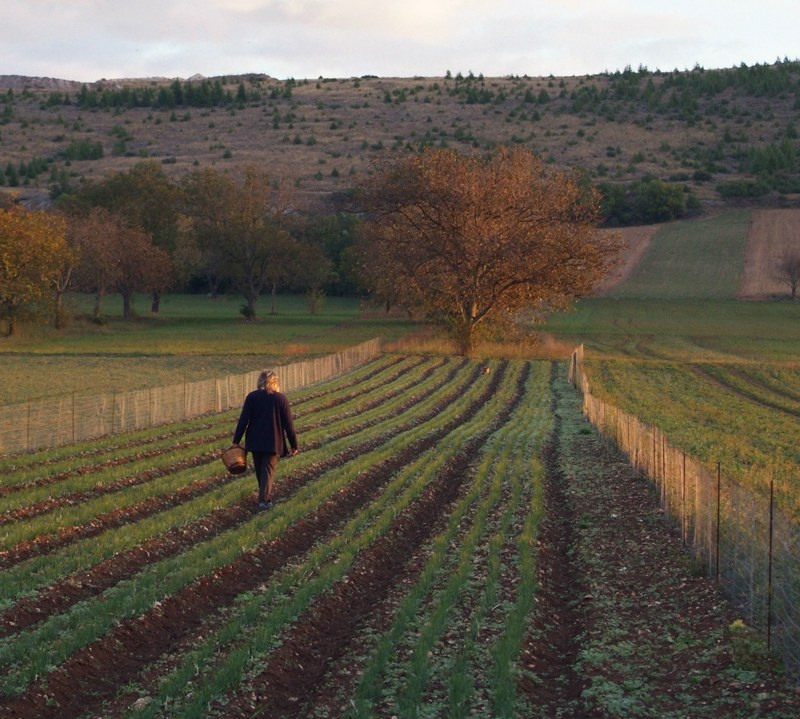
Saffron fields in Navelli, Abruzzo, Italy

Once the primary economic resource of the region, agriculture with its economic and industrial development has undergone a significant downsizing; in spite of this and the geology of the mainly mountainous territory not very suitable for certain types of crops, the region, also thanks to economic and industrial development, is today still able to offer various products of the highest quality; in the flat and hilly areas of the region numerous crops are grown such as figs, carrots, potatoes, grapes which place the region among the first in Italy for produce these crops; other important products are beetroot, wheat, barley, spelled and tobacco; the production of olives and vite is also important; finally, very important are the typical products of the region such as saffron and licorice.

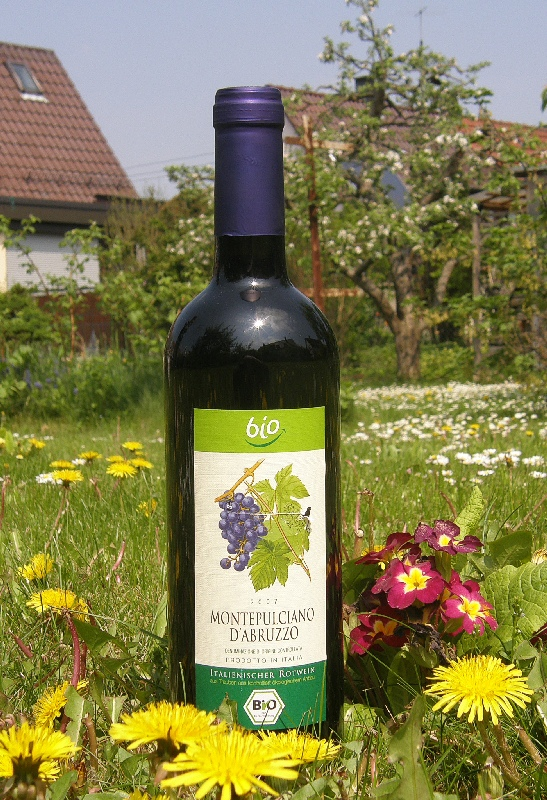
One of the best known and exported Abruzzo products in the world: Montepulciano d'Abruzzo wine

As for the figures, the region produces about 850,000 quintals of fruit, 5 million quintals of vegetables, 1,600,000 quintals of potatoes, 5,000,000 quintals of grapes produced, both for table and for the production of wine; the latter is estimated at between 3 and 4 million hectoliters with the production of wines such as Montepulciano d'Abruzzo in the red and cerasuolo (rosé) varieties, Trebbiano d'Abruzzo, Pecorino and the Chardonnay; oil production, on the other hand, stands at 1,350,000 quintals of olives and 240,000 quintals of oil (Aprutino Pescarese, Pretuziano delle Colline Teramane and Colline Teatine), figures that put Abruzzo in sixth place among the Italian regions; as regards cereals, the durum wheat with over 1.5 million quintals constitutes the main cereal, followed by soft wheat (one million quintals), then barley (0.5 million quintals ); other crops are also grown such as beetroot (2,500,000 quintals), and tobacco (45,000 quintals). Licorice on the other hand is mostly cultivated and processed in Atri and surroundings and sees the region in second place in Italy for production behind only Calabria. Another product typical of the region is Centerbe, a liqueur made by aromatic herbs commonly found on Mount Majella. Also Gentian is another liquor product of Abruzzo.

=== Breeding ===
In addition to agriculture, before economic and industrial development the regional economy was also based on livestock; the latter was widely practiced using the technique of transhumance towards the Roman countryside and the Tavoliere delle Puglie; today the breeding techniques have changed and permanent breeding in sheepfolds is preferred; even today the region has a good heritage of sheep, while bovino farming is spreading more and more.

=== Fishing ===
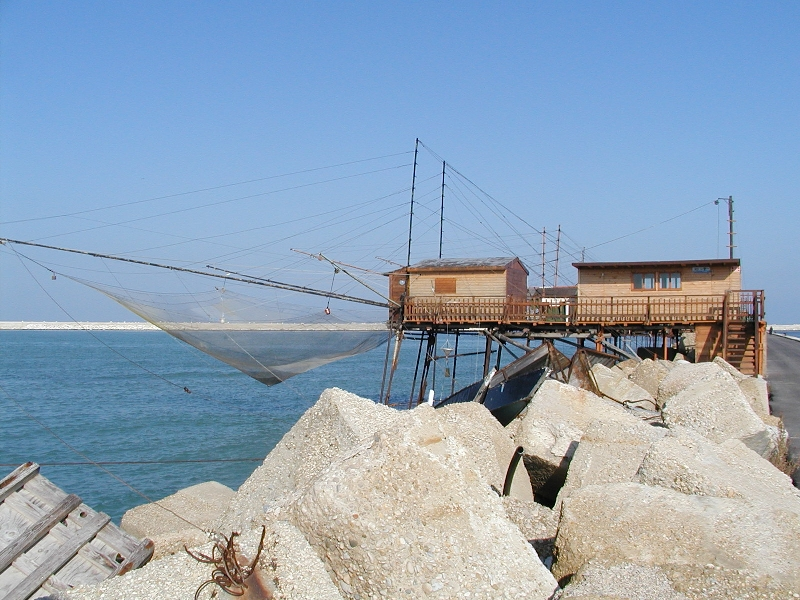
Trabocco in Pescara

Fishing (albeit to a lesser extent) was also one of the most important economic activities in the region, especially for some coastal centers; in the past it was practiced with ancient wooden fishing boats called Trabocchi from which today the stretch of the Abruzzo coast takes its name; today, Abruzzo has a fairly good fish production, to a lesser extent if compared with regions such as the Marche and Apulia; however, the region in this sector has bypassed regions with larger coastal areas such as Sardinia, Calabria, Tuscany, Campania, and Lazio; as regards the statistics of the fishing sector, in 2007 in Abruzzo the fish production was 14,657 tons of fish, a figure that placed the region in fifth place among the Italian regions after Sicily, Apulia, the Marche, the Veneto and Emilia Romagna by number of tons caught, with a 5.5% share of the national total and a revenue of approximately 51 million euros overall, equal to 3.8% of the national total.

=== Industry ===
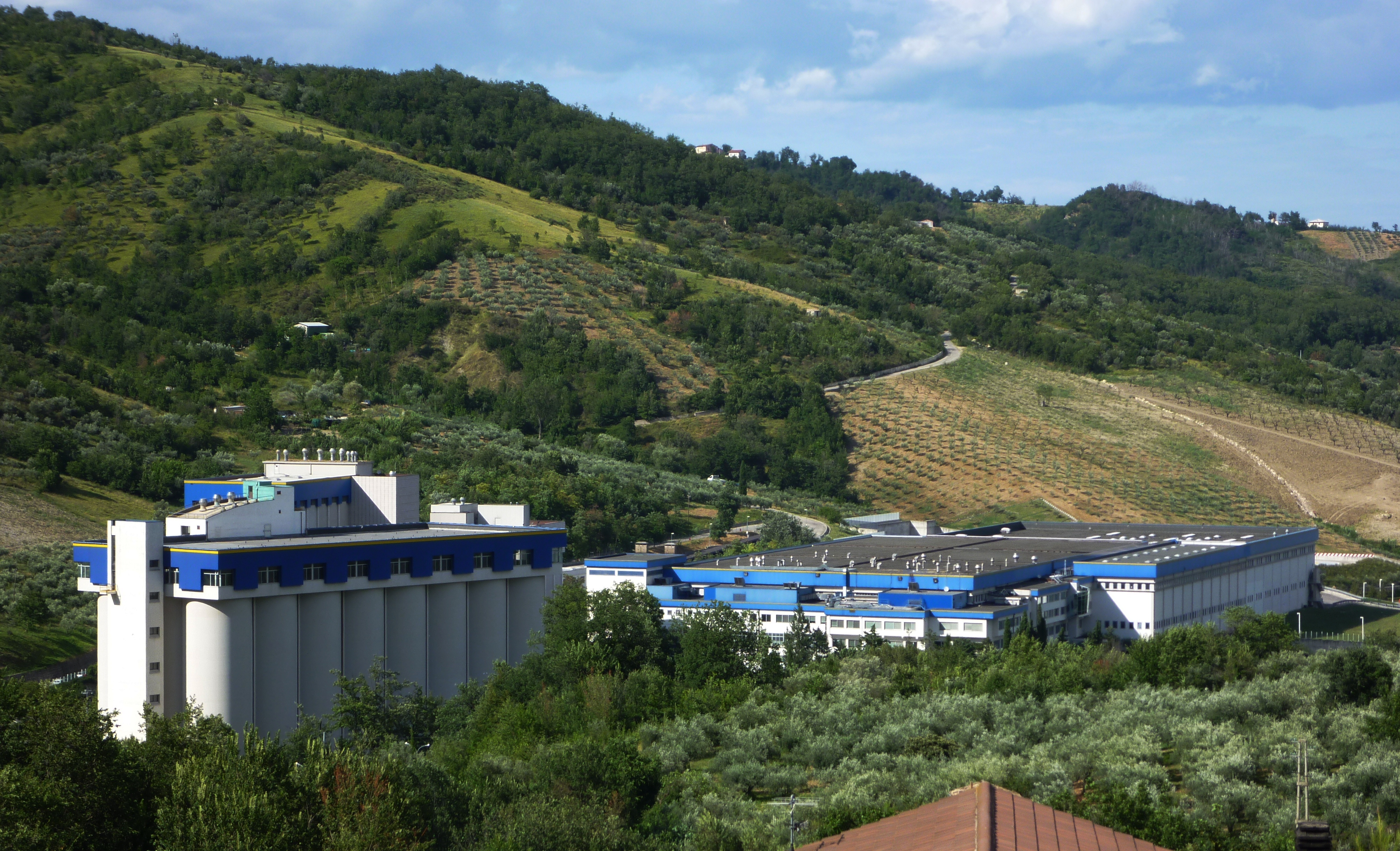
De Cecco factory in Fara San Martino

Between the 1960s and 1970s the region underwent considerable industrialization, so much so that it became the most industrialized region in the south of Italy, with an industrialization rate of 83.9%, more than double the southern average; the industry has developed in the food, transport, and telecommunications sectors. Other important industries are chemicals, food, furniture, crafts, and textiles. The province of Teramo is one of the most industrialized areas of Italy and of the region, with numerous small and medium-sized companies, then follows the province of Chieti and that of Pescara, which is also supported by tourism; the Val Vibrata (province of Teramo), on the border with the Marche region, is home to a myriad of small and medium-sized enterprises, especially in the textile and footwear sectors. The Val di Sangro (province of Chieti), on the other hand, is home to important multinationals and a factory belonging to the Fiat (Sevel) group. The area of Valle Peligna (province of L'Aquila) is also home to industries (the famous one of Sulmona sugared almonds), while other areas such as Pescara and Theatine are home to numerous industries, including multinationals (for example De Cecco, Procter & Gamble, Monti & Ambrosini Editori, Brioni, Ennedue and Miss Sixty, mostly concentrated in the industrial district of Val Pescara in the province of Chieti).

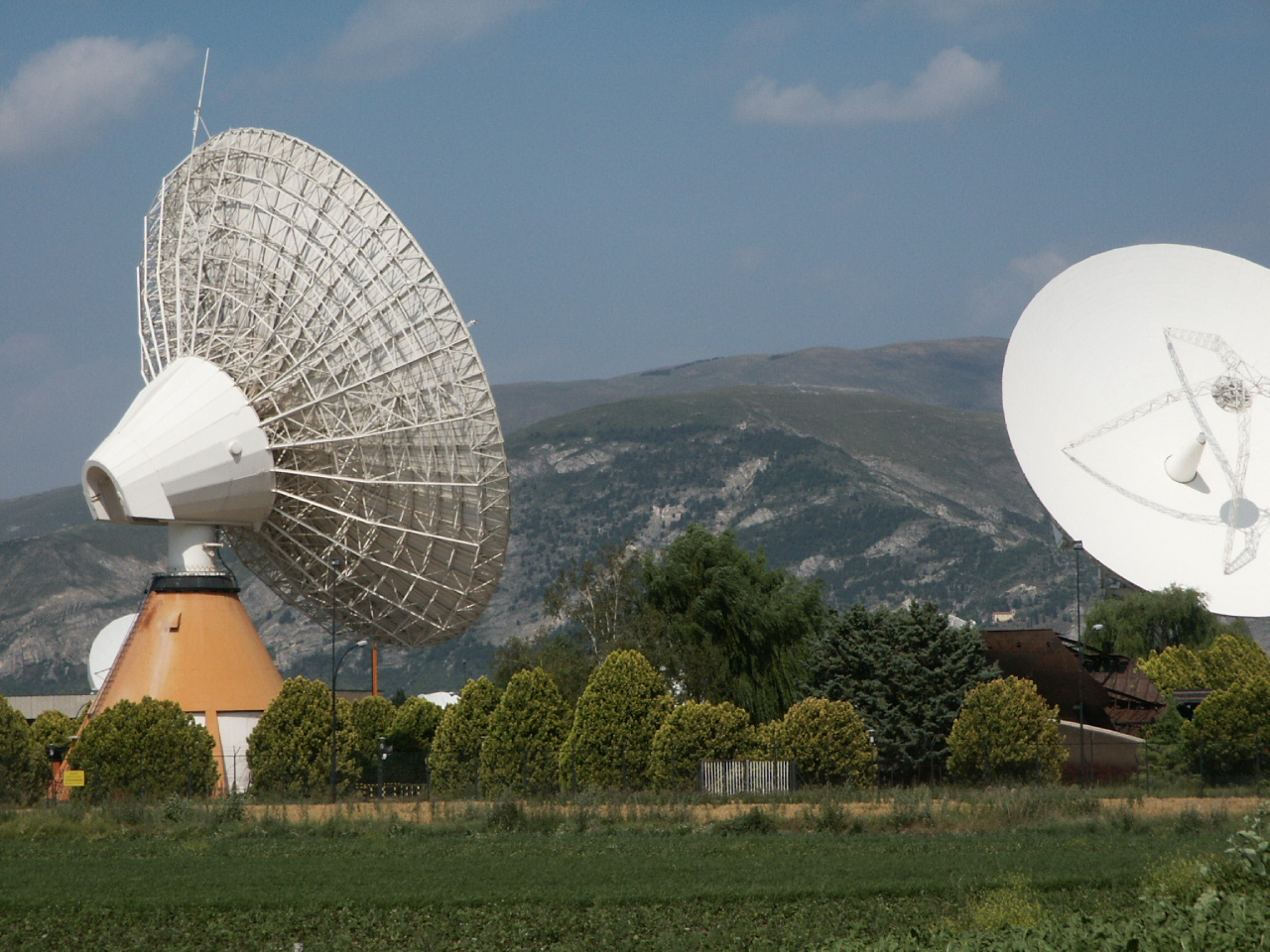
Telescopic parabolic antennas in Fucino of the Fucino Space Centre

Also important is the production of hydroelectric energy in artificial basins, which place the region ninth in this ranking. The regional subsoil resources are also discrete, with fields of petroleum, methane and aluminum; the region, however, has made it known that it will continue its environmentalist development policy to safeguard the beauty of the environment, therefore it will not work for the exploitation of the oil fields itself. Another very flourishing industrial sector in the region is that concerning research in fields of pharmaceutical, biomedicine, electronics, and nuclear physics (Laboratori Nazionali del Gran Sasso); the most important industrial centers in the province of L'Aquila are concentrated in Marsica or in the city of Avezzano where there are high-tech industries (LFoundry-Smic, Micron, Telespazio), Burgo cartiere and processing industries of agricultural products and around the industrial centers of L'Aquila and Sulmona; the inland mountain areas are the least developed in the region but are nevertheless supported by the development of mountain and winter tourism.

=== Crafts ===
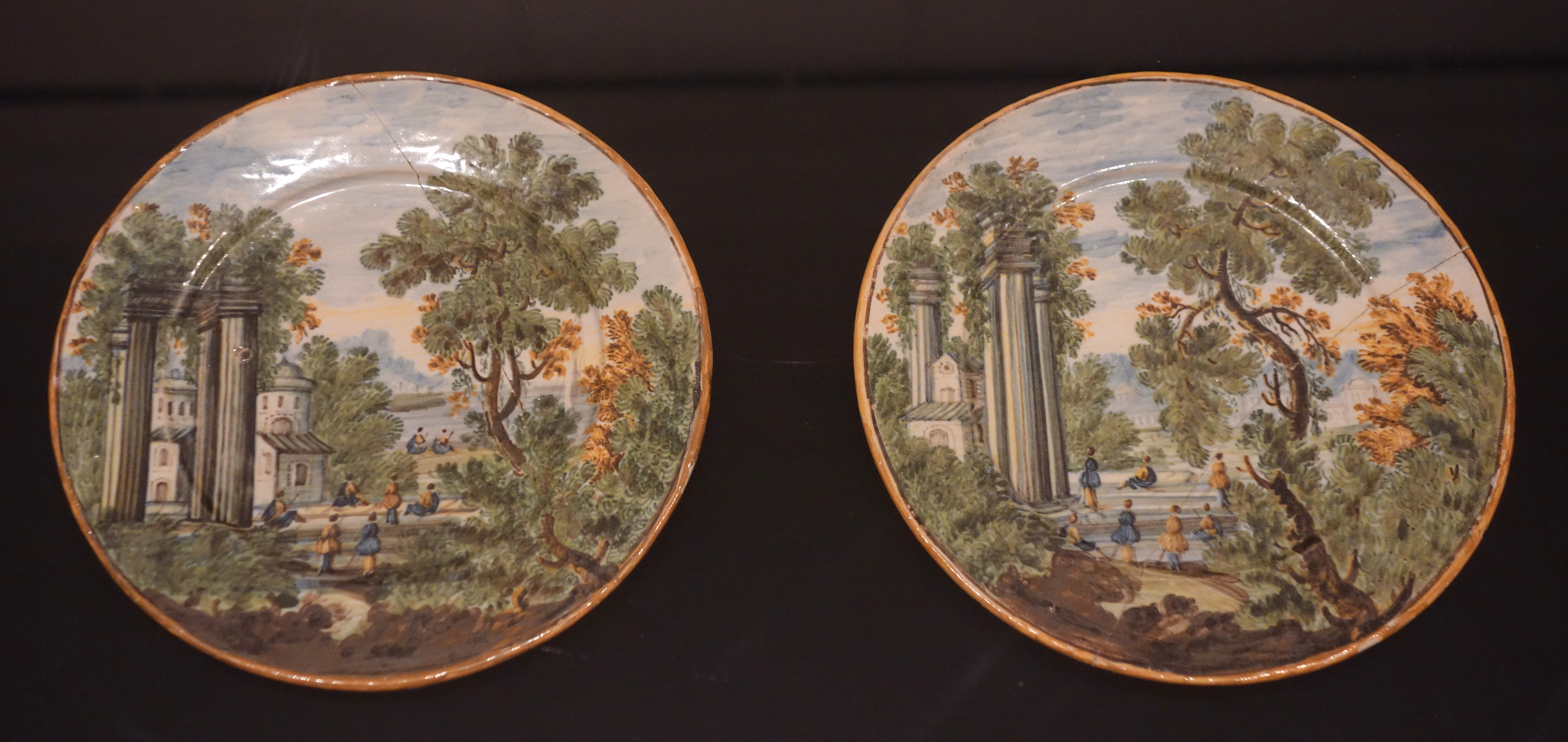
Maiolica from Castelli d'Abruzzo

Not to be overlooked is crafts, a highly developed activity in the region which has been preserved over the centuries and which produces products such as ceramic, iron, gold, lace, fabrics, copper, musical instruments, stone, wood and wool; the main production centers are Pescocostanzo, Scanno (lace and fabrics), Castelli (ceramics), Guardiagrele, Pescocostanzo, Scanno, Sulmona and Giulianova (gold), Guardiagrele, Pescocostanzo, Lanciano, Ortona, Vasto, Tossicia and Scanno (copper and iron), Giulianova, Teramo and L'Aquila (musical instruments), Lettomanoppello, Pretoro, Pennapiedimonte and Pacentro (stone), L'Aquila (leather).

=== Tourism ===
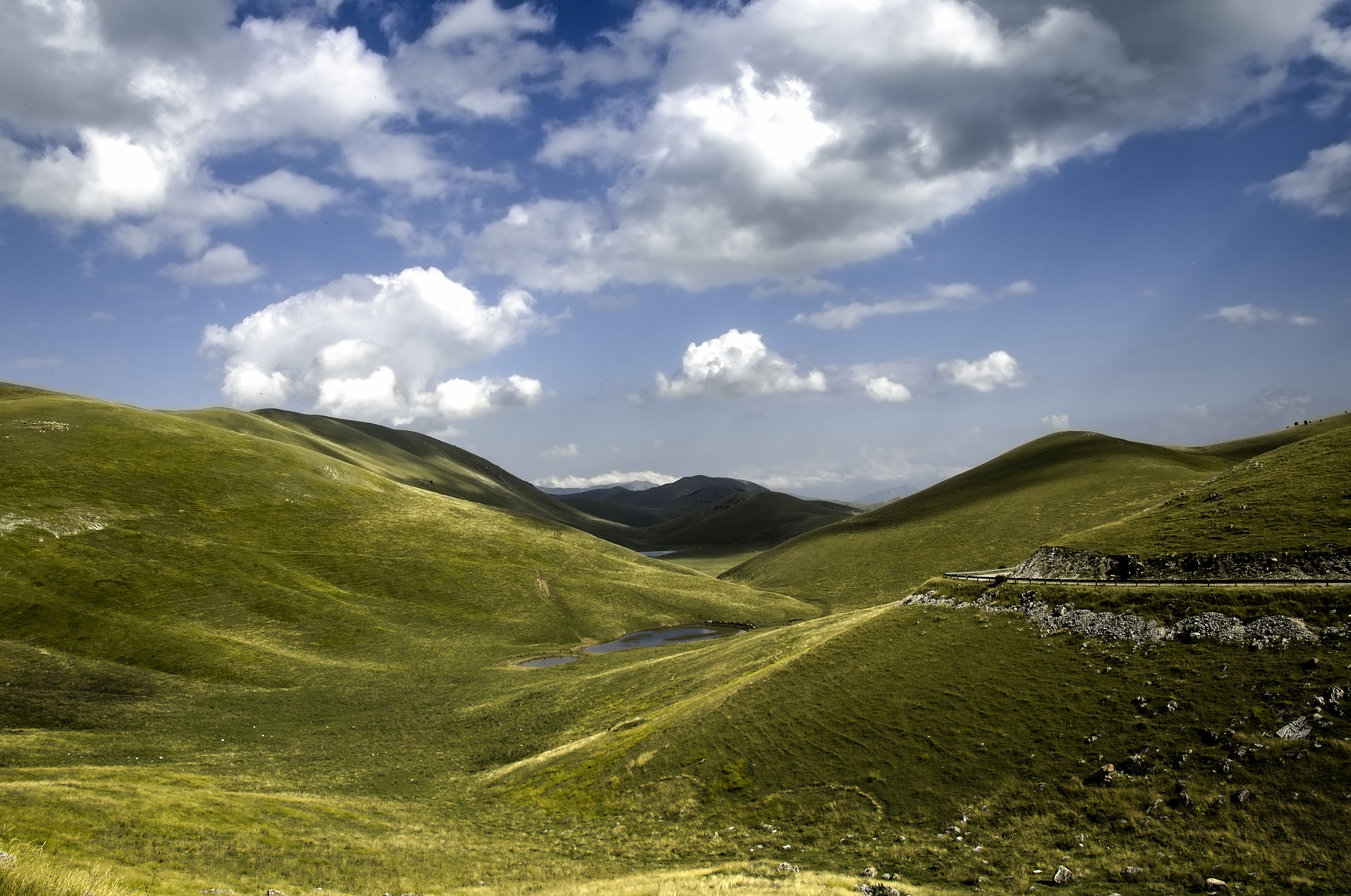
Gran Sasso e Monti della Laga National Park

With the economic and industrial development, also the tourism sector in the region has had considerable development and today it is one of the main sectors of the Abruzzo economy. Tourism in Abruzzo has seen a notable growth with thousands of visitors arriving from all over Italy and also from Europe itself; in 2023, arrivals were 1.745.373 tourists. Tourism in Abruzzo can be classified into three different types of tourism; mountain and environmental tourism, coastal and seaside tourism and finally historical-religious and cultural tourism.

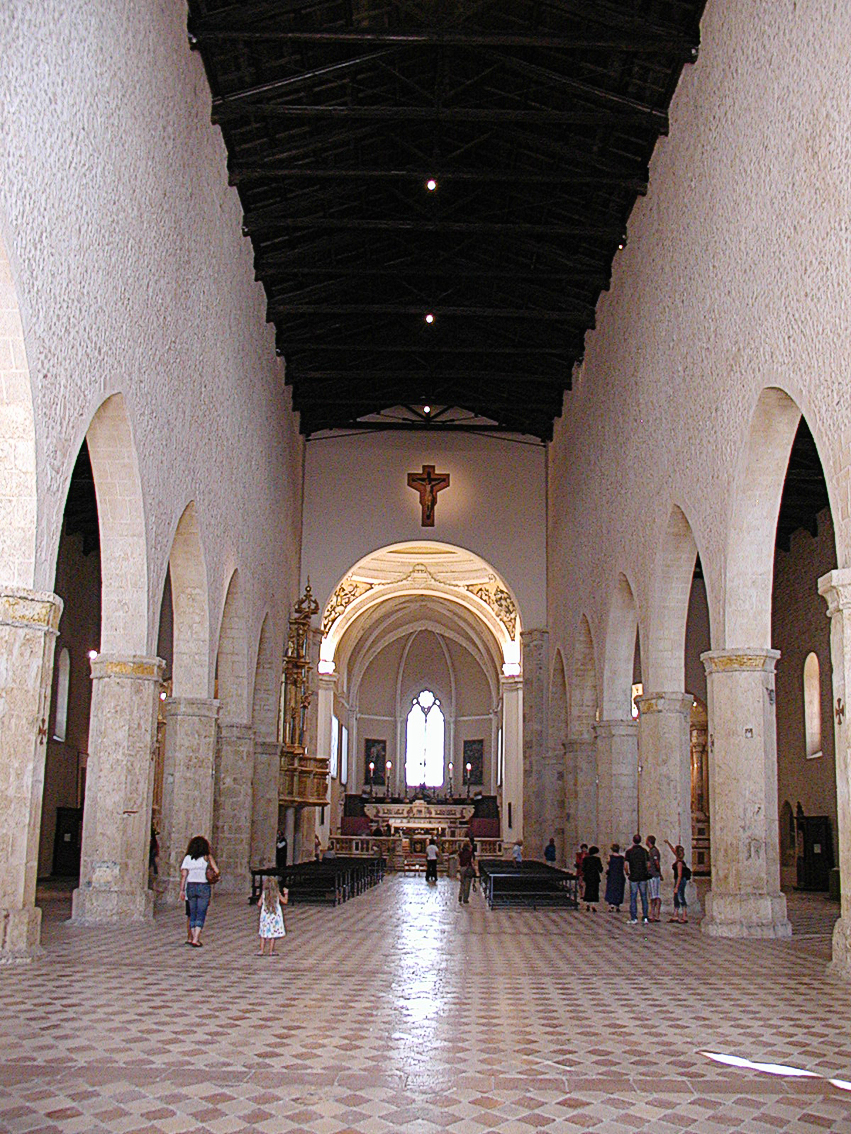
Santa Maria di Collemaggio

Very popular with visitors from all over Italy and Europe the natural parks of the region such as the Abruzzo, Lazio and Molise National Park, the Gran Sasso e Monti della Laga National Park, the Maiella National Park and the Sirente-Velino Regional Park which every year attract thousands of visitors thanks to their nature unspoiled and rare wild fauna and flora species such as Abruzzo chamois moreover the region can boast many reserves, protected natural areas and lakes (Campotosto Lake and Lago di Scanno).

In the inland mountain areas there are the ski resorts of Scanno, Ovindoli, Pescasseroli, Tagliacozzo, Roccaraso, Campo Imperatore, Campo Felice, Rivisondoli, Pescocostanzo, Prati di Tivo, San Giacomo (Valle Castellana), Passolanciano-Majelletta, Prato Selva, Campo Rotondo, Campo di Giove, Passo San Leonardo, Passo Godi, Pizzoferrato, and Gamberale, where winter tourism is highly developed and then you can play sports such as alpine skiing, snowboarding, ski mountaineering, ski touring, cross-country skiing and dog sledding.

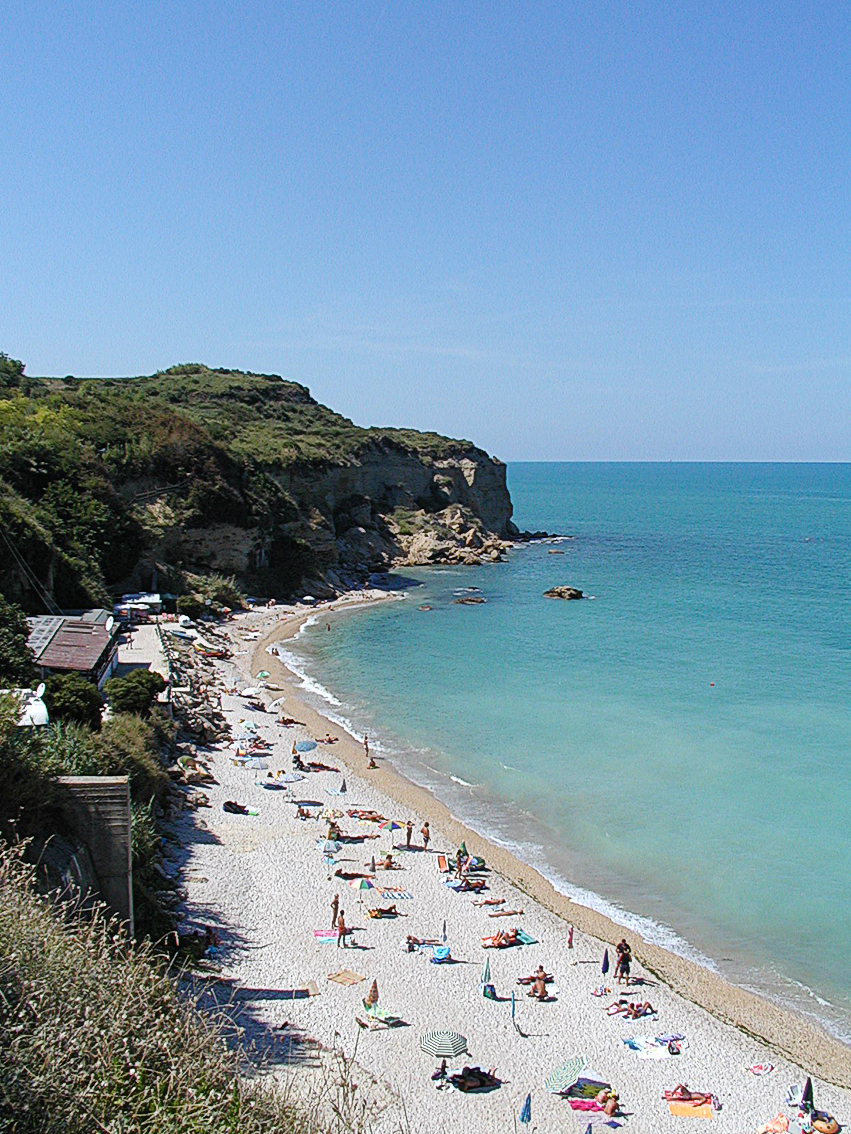
Ortona Beach

Also of considerable importance is the summer coastal and seaside tourism, which sees the presence of numerous tourist bathing establishments equipped in various centers of the coast such as Pescara, Montesilvano, Pineto, Roseto degli Abruzzi, Giulianova, Alba Adriatica, Tortoreto, Ortona, Vasto, Martinsicuro, Silvi Marina and the Trabocchi Coast.

Finally, tourism for historical and cultural purposes is also important, concentrated above all in the cities of Chieti, Teramo, Vasto, Giulianova, Sulmona, and above all L'Aquila which can boast many monuments, museums, castles and churches (St. Gabriel's shrine and Santa Maria di Collemaggio) of national importance; also Pescara despite being a modern city, boasts monuments, churches and museums of historical importance such as the Birthplace of Gabriele D'Annunzio Museum. In the inland mountain areas there are ancient villages, castles, hermitages, sanctuaries abbeys, and ancient churches.
