= Cantelmo Castle =

- Castello Cantelmo
- Pettorano sul Gizio
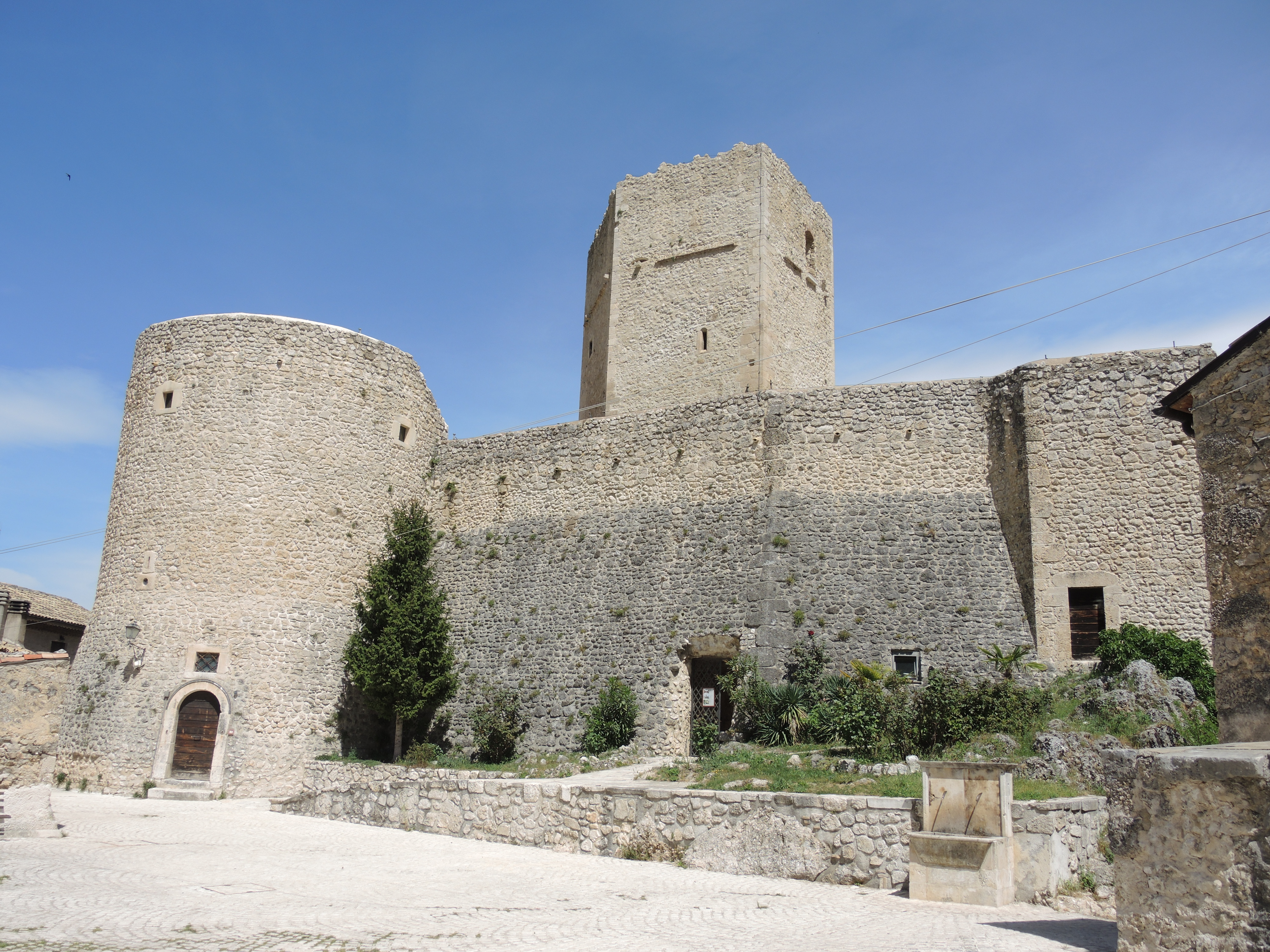
- Cantelmo Castle.

Site information
- Type: Castle
- Condition: Visitable

Location
- Coordinates: 41°58′17.62″N 13°57′39.79″E

Site history
- Built: 11th century

Castello Cantelmo (Italian for Cantelmo Castle) is a Middle Ages castle in Pettorano sul Gizio, province of L'Aquila, Abruzzo, southern-central Italy.

The castle, built around the 11th century, overlooks the Gizio river valley and the Valle Peligna. It has an irregular plan with cylindrical, massive towers at the north-western and south-western corners, while at south-eastern one are the remains of a quadrangular tower. In the middle is a pentagonal tower, which is the most ancient part of the castle.
