= Scanno =

Scanno may refer to:

- Scanno, Abruzzo, a comune in Italy
- Lago di Scanno, a lake in Abruzzo
- the equivalent of a typo, resulting from imperfect optical character recognition of a document digitized with a scanner
