= Sagittario =

Sagittario may refer to:

- Sagittario (river), a river in the Abruzzo region of southern Italy
- Black hole at the center of the Milky-Way Galaxy, also known as the radio source Sagittarius A*
- Sagittario, a Beyblade top from the Metal Fusion Hybrid Wheel system of Beyblades
- Reggiane Re.2005 Sagittario, Italian fighter aircraft of World War II
