= Rocca di Villalago =

Coordinates: 41.9365°N 13.8365°E

Villalago Rocca
- Rocca di Villalago
- Roccacasale
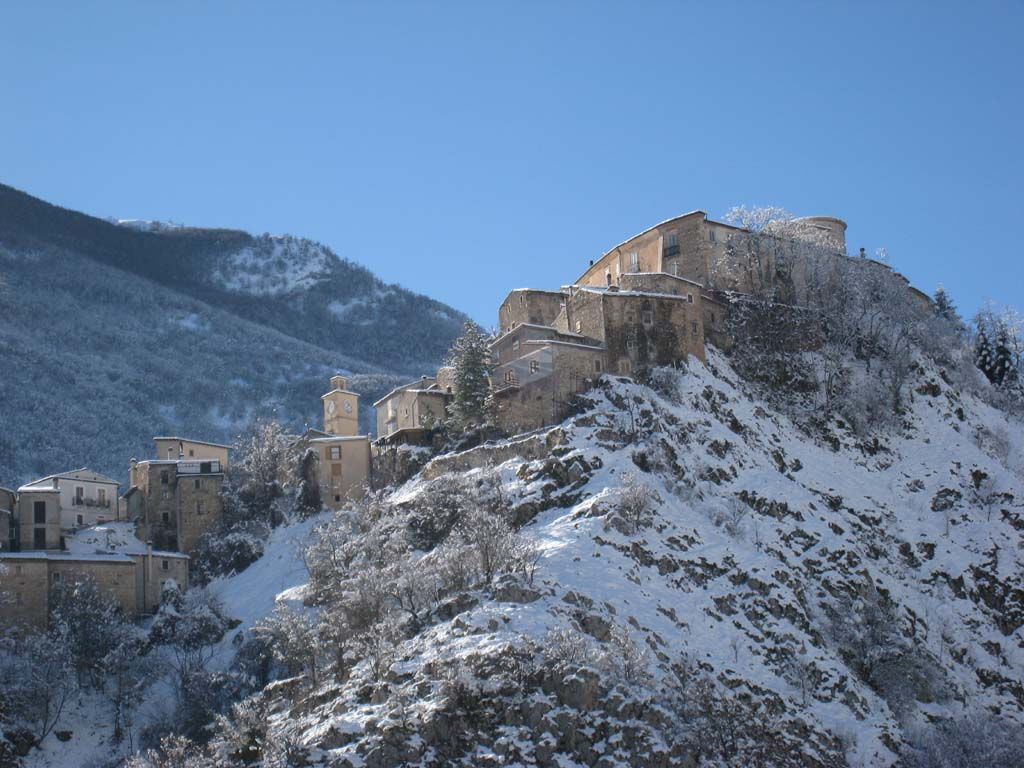
- View of the rocca

Site information
- Type: Castle

Location

Site history
- Built: 8th century

Rocca di Villalago (Italian for Villalago Rocca) is a Middle Ages rocca in Villalago, Province of L'Aquila (Abruzzo).

== History ==
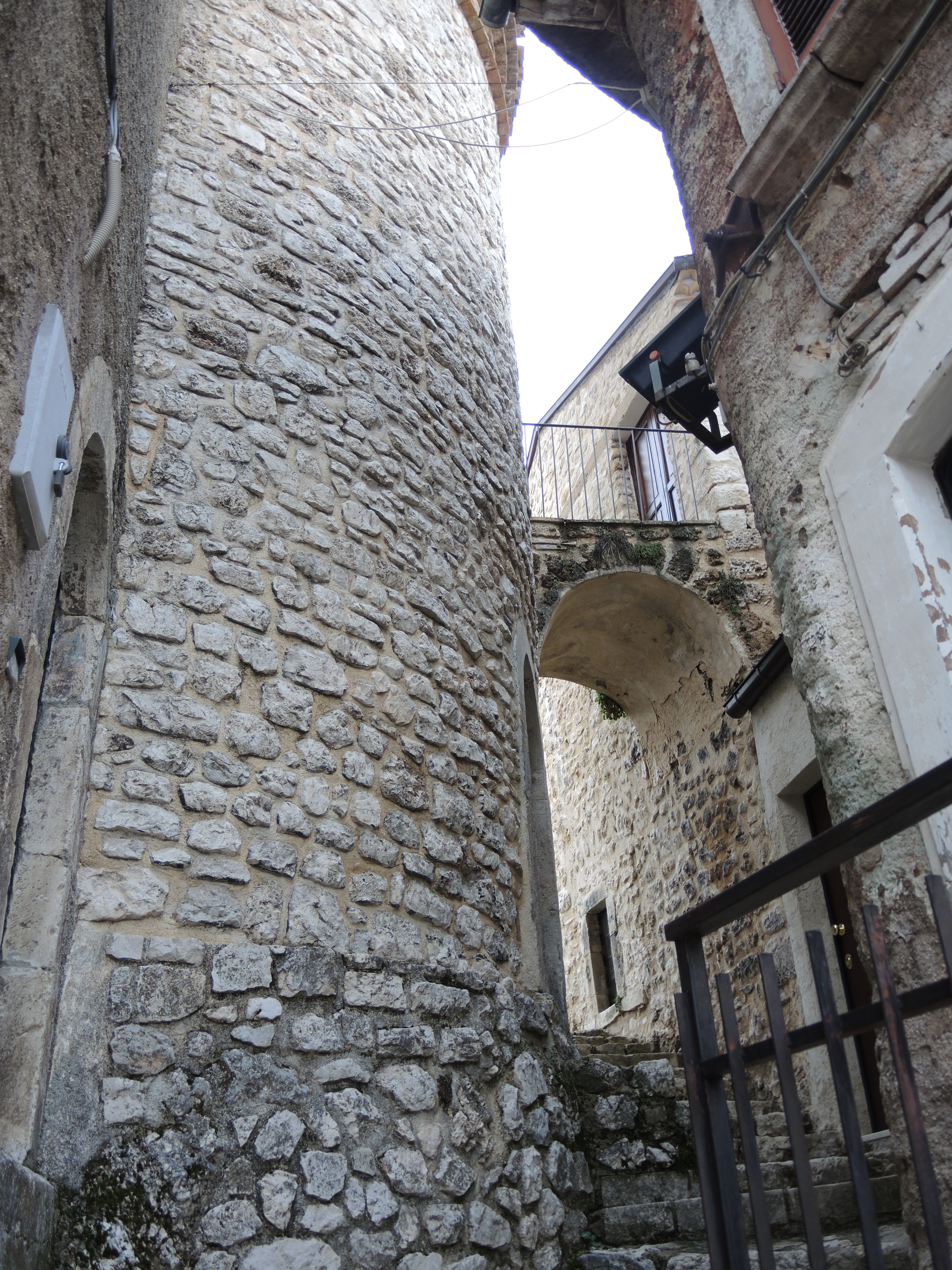
Tower

Built in a strategic position on a hill overlooking the Sagittario Valley, the structure served as a defensive and watchtower. Currently, some interiors of the fortress house the Museum of Arts and Popular Traditions of Villalago.

Structurally, it consisted of defensive walls and a cylindrical keep about ten to twelve meters high, equipped with battlements, constructed in a Romanesque style. The defensive walls have been partially replaced by civilian houses, but the keep is still in good condition.

== Architecture ==
The Baronial Palace is the main part of the fortress, built in the Middle Ages. It now houses the aforementioned museum. The structure is rectangular but irregular, divided into two levels by a cornice. The windows are rectangular.

The Lombard tower is the oldest part of the entire fortress. It has a circular structure with a pitched roof (similar to a pagoda), and small windows for watch shifts. At its base are the ruins of a second tower, which have been converted into a lookout point for tourism. However, the cylindrical tower is also visitable.

Near the tower are the remains of a medieval noble chapel, adjoining the Baronial Palace. The Oratory of Our Lady of Sorrows was built around the 1300s and has traces of frescoes.

The Museum of Trades of the Fortress was open in 2003 in the halls of the Baronial Palace, it comprises several rooms displaying informative panels and faithful reproductions of ancient local trades. It particularly describes the work of the shepherd and the journeys along the Abruzzo sheep tracks. Later, it also details the trades of the fisherman and the miller.
