= Castello di Ortona dei Marsi =

Castle in Ortona dei Marsi (AQ), Italy

Coordinates: 41.9991°N 13.7250°E

Castle of Ortona dei Marsi
- Castello di Ortona dei Marsi
- Ortona dei Marsi
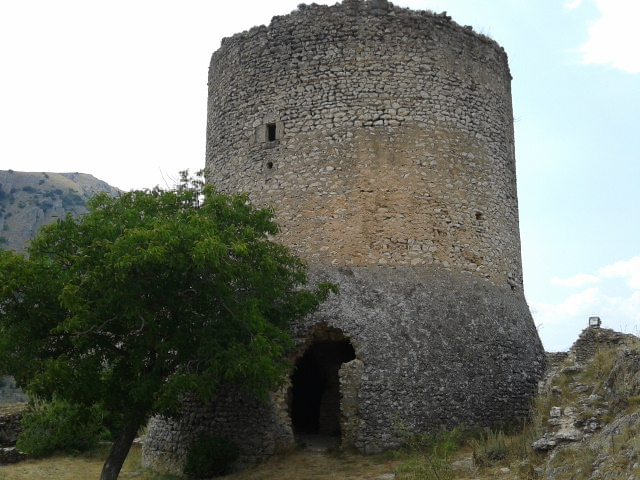
- Castle in Ortona dei Marsi

Site information
- Type: Castle

Location

Site history
- Built: 13th century

Castello di Ortona dei Marsi (Italian for Castle of Ortona dei Marsi) is a Middle Ages castle in Ortona dei Marsi, Province of L'Aquila (Abruzzo).

== History ==
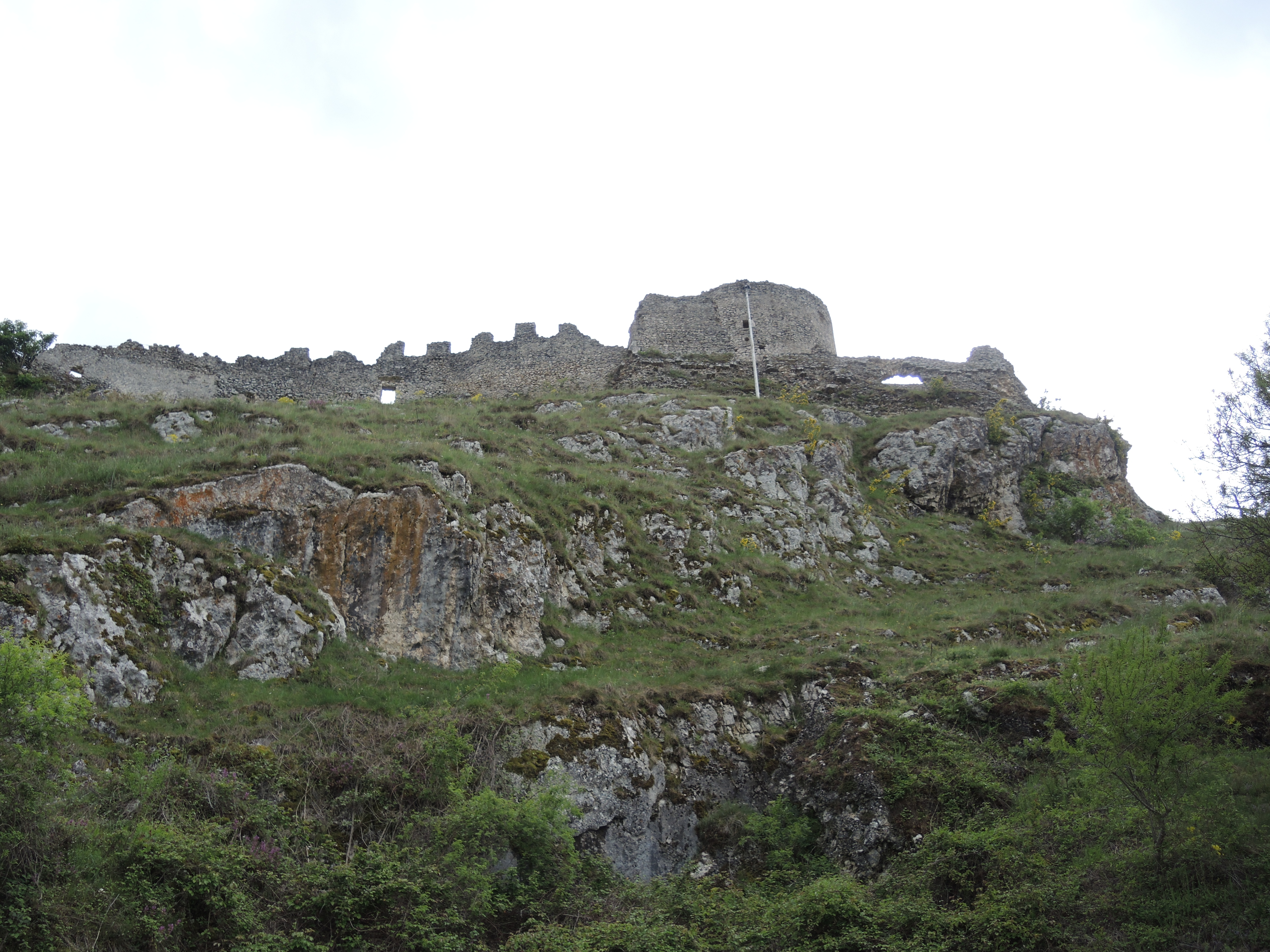
View of the castle

Strategically located on a pass that connects the eastern plateau of Fucino with the valley of the Sagittario, Ortona dei Marsi has very ancient origins dating back to the Italic city of Milonia.

The first historical records concerning the current town date back to the 12th century and mention its belonging to the Counts of Celano. Later, the fief passed to the Cantelmo family in the 15th century and to Francescantonio Paolini in 1666, eventually becoming property of the Massimi family in the 18th century.

Already in decline at the beginning of the 20th century, it did not suffer further serious damage following the 1915 Avezzano earthquake. The original structure of the castle is in a state of ruin with only the tower in good condition.

== Architecture ==
Overlooking the town and the Giovenco valley, the castle remains include the ruins of the surrounding walls and a central tower.

The tower, cylindrical in shape with a scarp base, was added to the castle in the 16th century to allow the feudal lords to control the town against potential popular uprisings.

Access to the tower is through an elevated entrance from the ground on the north side; on the opposite side, there is an opening with a slit window.
