= Giuseppe Cavalli =

Italian photographer (1904–1961)

Giuseppe Cavalli (29 November 1904 – 25 October 1961) was an Italian photographer, little known outside his native country. His work had a "simple, quiet aesthetic" and he was "best known for his ‘high-key’ style, characterised by the use of bright, even lighting to minimise shadow." Cavalli was a joint founder of the photography group La Bussola (The Compass) in 1947. He also formed the photography group Misa in 1953.

== Life and work ==
Cavalli was born in 1904, in Lucera in Italy’s southern Apulia region. He practised as a lawyer until 1935. After purchasing his first camera, in 1939 he settled in the seaside town of Senigallia on the Adriatic coast and devoted himself to photography.

With Luigi Veronesi and others he founded the photography group La Bussola (It) (The Compass) in 1947, and singularly he founded the photography group Misa in 1953. Mario Giacomelli, whom Cavalli influenced, was an early member of Misa. Cavalli wrote essays about Bussola's aesthetic that were published in Italian photographic journals, and promoted photography exhibitions and competitions.

Cavalli died in Senigallia in 1961 at the age of fifty-seven.

== Publications ==
- Giuseppe Cavalli. Fotografie 1936-1961. Rome: Gangemi. ISBN 978-8849209860. Italian. "Catalog of an exhibition held Apr. 8-May 31, 2006 at the Museo di Roma-Palazzo Braschi, Rome, Italy."
- Giuseppe Cavalli: Nature Morte. Milan: Baldini Castoldi Dalai, 2009. ISBN 9788860731937. Edited by Angela Madesani. Texts in Italian and English.
- Giuseppe Cavalli: Photographs (with Martin Harrison), published by Faggionato Fine Arts, London.

== Collection ==
In late 2025, five items of Cavalli's work are held in the following permanent collection:

- Tate, London
