= Baron Michele Leone =

Italian professional wrestler (1909–1988)

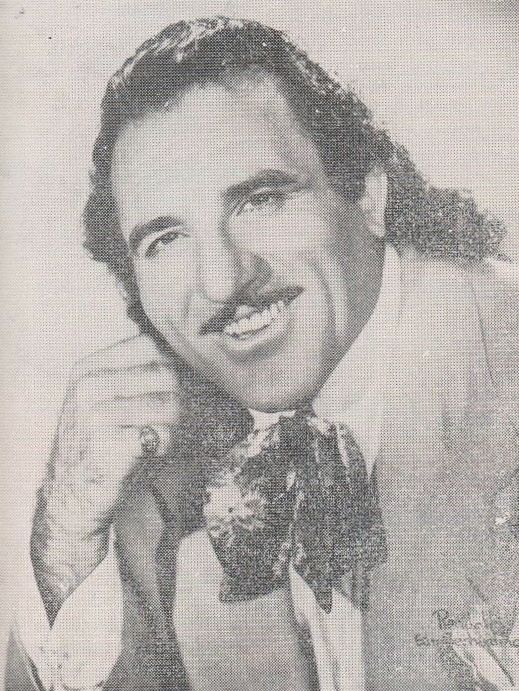
- Leone, circa 1952

Personal information
- Born: Michele Leone; June 8, 1909 Pettorano sul Gizio, L'Aquila, Abruzzo, Italy
- Died: November 14, 1988 (aged 79) Los Angeles, California, U.S.
- Cause of death: Automobile accident
- Spouse: Billie Leone (m. 1954)

Professional wrestling career
- Ring name: Baron Michele Leone
- Billed height: 5 ft 10 in (1.78 m)
- Billed weight: 215 lb (98 kg)
- Billed from: Italy
- Trained by: Michele Leone (uncle); Hugh Nichols
- Debut: 1933
- Retired: 1979

Michele Leone (June 8, 1909 – November 26, 1988), known by his ring name Baron Michele Leone, was an Italian-born professional wrestler. He was one of the biggest stars and most prominent heels of the early television era of wrestling and, in May 1952, was a part of professional wrestling's first $100,000 gate, when he faced Lou Thesz in a title vs. title bout.

== Early life ==
Leone was born to parents Giovanni and Anna Leone in Pettorano sul Gizio, in the Abruzzo region of Italy; the same home region as fellow professional wrestler Bruno Sammartino.

Though his parents disapproved, Michele began wrestling at a young age. According to Leone he was champion of his area by age 14. Any money he earned in his initial wrestling endeavours were reinvested into wrestling lessons. Little is known of his early wrestling career. He reportedly became moderately well known on the European circuit and once visited South America to wrestle.

== Professional wrestling career ==
=== New York, East Coast and D.C. territories ===
After completing his training and gaining ring experience in Europe around 1935, Leone migrated to the United States, arriving in New York City in early 1938. On April 18, Leone won his American debut by defeating Vanka Zelezniak in New York City. On June 28, 1938, he wrestled his first known main event in the U.S. against Dr. John "Dropkick" Murphy.

In June, 1940, Leone began wrestling in Joe Turner's Washington, D.C., territory. It was whilst wrestling here that the United States entered World War II. The U.S. was now at war with Leone's native Italy, which made him an instant heel. As an Italian citizen, Leone was exempt from being drafted into the military and as more and more wrestlers were drafted, it opened up new spots on cards for Leone as a top heel. He would become a headliner in DC, notably feuding in headline bouts against “Gentleman” Lou Plummer. Attendance rose steadily with Leone in the main event. Memorably, he headlined one such event against Hans Kampfer, a German, where he worked as the heel. It is said that this match illustrated his abilities as a 'bad guy', having gotten boos from the fans in a match against a German during World War II. Leone left the D.C. territory at the end of the war in 1945 and began wrestling throughout the East Coast. He briefly returned to Europe in 1947 before returning to the U.S. East Coast in 1948.

Leone known for his rough style and heelish tactics would sometimes be cheered as a baby face. Such instance occurred on November 27, 1944, in Asbury Park, New Jersey. Facing Duke Keomuka (a Hawaiian portraying and evil Japanese wrestler) Leone went out prior to their match and gave a passionate promo against the Japanese. For his effort, he sold $2,000 is U.S. War Bonds prior to defeating Duke Keomuka. He would also appear at charity events to sell U.S. War bonds in Philadelphia, Pennsylvania often taking place at the Navy Yard Receiving Station in that city.

On June 26, 1944, Leone received his first "World" title match against Babe Sharkey (claimant to an East Coast version) in Wilmington, Delaware. Leone lost but it was noted that this title match drew one of the biggest crowds ever in Wilmington. The weekly average was roughly 900 but this match drew over 1,800 fans.

On January 19, 1949, Leone made his return to the D.C. territory, wrestling in a losing effort against Gorgeous George in the main event. The show also featured a young Stu Hart on the card.

=== California territory ===
Michele made his debut in Johnny Doyle's Los Angeles/Southern California territory in October 1949, where he took up the mantle of "Baron" Michele Leone, an Italian aristocrat.

Leone became the Los Angeles territory's leading star while working for Doyle, due to a combination of his skill on the microphone and Southern California's many wrestling television programs. The still-new medium of television was central to his rise from journeyman to top draw. Leone headlined several events at the Olympic Auditorium against opponents such as Leo Garibaldi, Jack Claybourne and Kimon Kudo. He also teamed with his former opponent Gorgeous George.

On March 8, 1950, Leone wrestled future WWF Hall of Famer Antonino Rocca in front of a sold out 10,400 fans. 6,000 fans were also reportedly turned away at the gate.

==== World Heavyweight Championship and Feud with Lou Thesz ====
Leone faced Enrique Torres at the Olympic Auditorium on November 22, 1950, in front of a reported 10,400 fans in a two-out-of-three falls match for the Los Angeles version of the World Heavyweight Championship. He captured the second and third falls of the match to win the world title.

As world champion and with an expanding television audience, Leone became one of the biggest sports stars in Southern California and the territory's top draw. His appearance on programs such as Charlie Aldridge, Dennis Day and Horace Heidt's Family Night Show, raised his profile considerably, few wrestlers in the United States received comparable exposure. A promotional appearance at a store in Oxnard drew over 1,000 fans, despite heavy rain, with Leone presenting female fans an orchard and giving every fan an autographed photograph of himself.”

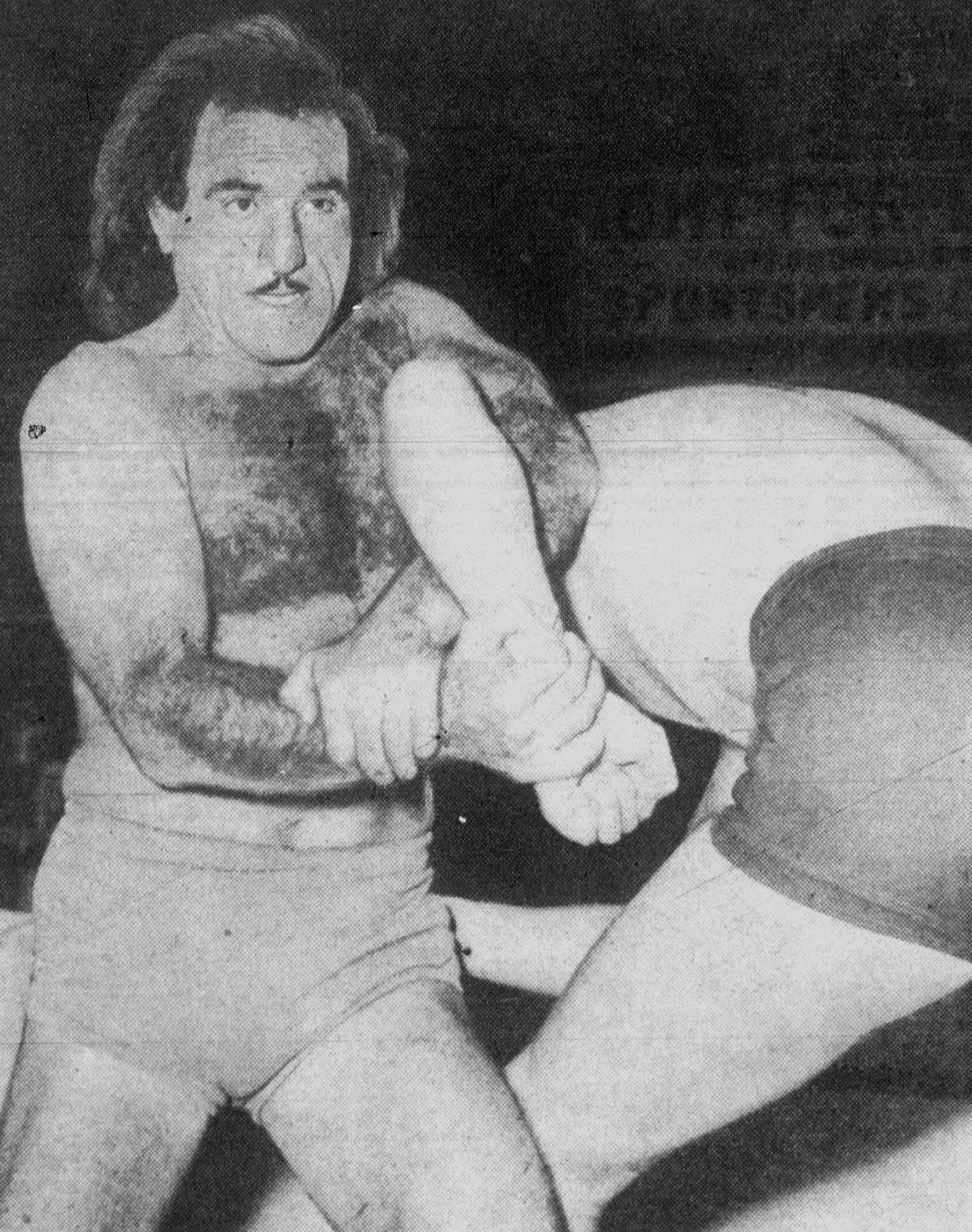
Leone sparring with Vic Christy in 1952

Leone, with a combination of heel heat and broad appeal, carried the territory to new financial heights. NWA World Heavyweight champion Lou Thesz came to the territory in July 1951 and, finding himself overshadowed by Leone, was reportedly unhappy with this status. Thesz addressed these concerns at the annual NWA member's meeting in Tulsa, where the prospect of eliminating the California-version of the world title (held by Leone) was discussed. Doyle - a member of the championship committee - agreed to not book Michele Leone (or Enrique Torres) as champions outside of California. This did not assuage the NWA's concerns of a growing regional "world champion" and Doyle, who had been suspended briefly by the NWA, agreed to a unification bout. On May 21, 1952, Leone lost the L.A. "Olympic" version of the world title to Lou Thesz at Hollywood's Gilmore Field in L.A. in a unification match. The event drew 25,256 fans and took $103,277.75 at the gate, making it the first professional wrestling match to garner over $100,000 at the gate

==== Junior Heavyweight Championship and later career ====
Though having lost the championship, the Baron remained the top draw in the Southern California territory. In December 1952, he defeated Rito Romero at the Olympic Auditorium to win the Pacific Coast heavyweight championship. Leone would go on to defeat Danny McShane for the NWA World Junior Heavyweight Championship on August 16, 1953, at Hollywood's Legion Stadium in Hollywood.

Leone's television popularity made him an in-demand talent and he was able to take bookings throughout the United States. He remained a regular performer in Los Angeles while working a semi-regular schedule in the Georgia territory. He left L.A. in 1954, and relocated to Texas. He would wrestle Lou Thesz in losing efforts three more times for the NWA World Heavyweight Championship; on February 16, 1954, in El Paso, Texas, October 13, 1954, in Tulsa, Oklahoma and February 25, 1955, in Miami, Florida.

== Later life and death ==
Shortly after his final bout with Thesz, Leone retired from professional wrestling, being independently wealthy from his career. He returned to Italy along with his wife, Billie, whom he married 1954. They returned to the United States and relocated back to Leone's apartment building in Santa Monica. Michele and Billie travelled frequently and Leone spent his later days partaking in various leisure activities by the Pacific Ocean.

Whilst crossing the street near his home on November 14, 1988, Leone was struck by a motorist. He died at UCLA Medical Center on November 26, 1988.

== Personal life ==
Leone married his wife Billie in 1954, with whom he remained for the rest of his life. During his career, he became a star in Southern California, and outside of wrestling he was hired by ABC to host a television programme, "Advice to the Lovelorn", offering advice to couples.

== Legacy ==
Michele Leone was one of the first wrestling stars of the television era. He was one of the first professional wrestlers, along with the likes of Gorgeous George, to be known for his showmanship and his in-ring prowess.

In the 2000s, his wife Billie donated $100,000 in Michele's memory to the Santa Monica Historical Society Museum. Symbolically, this was the same amount which Leone drew with Lou Thesz during their May, 1952 bout for the NWA Heavyweight championship; the first $100,000 gate in wrestling. The amount was donated to help support construction of the museum's relocation. Billie Leone stated: “my husband moved to Santa Monica in 1949, and that began his lifelong love affair with Santa Monica. He loved everything about the city.” The museum now houses a permanent exhibit featuring the highlights of The Baron's career.

== Championships and accomplishments ==
- National Wrestling Alliance
  - World Heavyweight Championship (Los Angeles version) (1 time)
  - NWA World Junior Heavyweight Championship (1 time)
  - NWA Pacific Coast Heavyweight Championship (Los Angeles version) (2 times)
- Professional Wrestling Hall of Fame
  - Class of 2019
- WWE
  - WWE Hall of Fame (Class of 2020)
