= Mario Giacomelli =

Italian photographer (1925–2000)

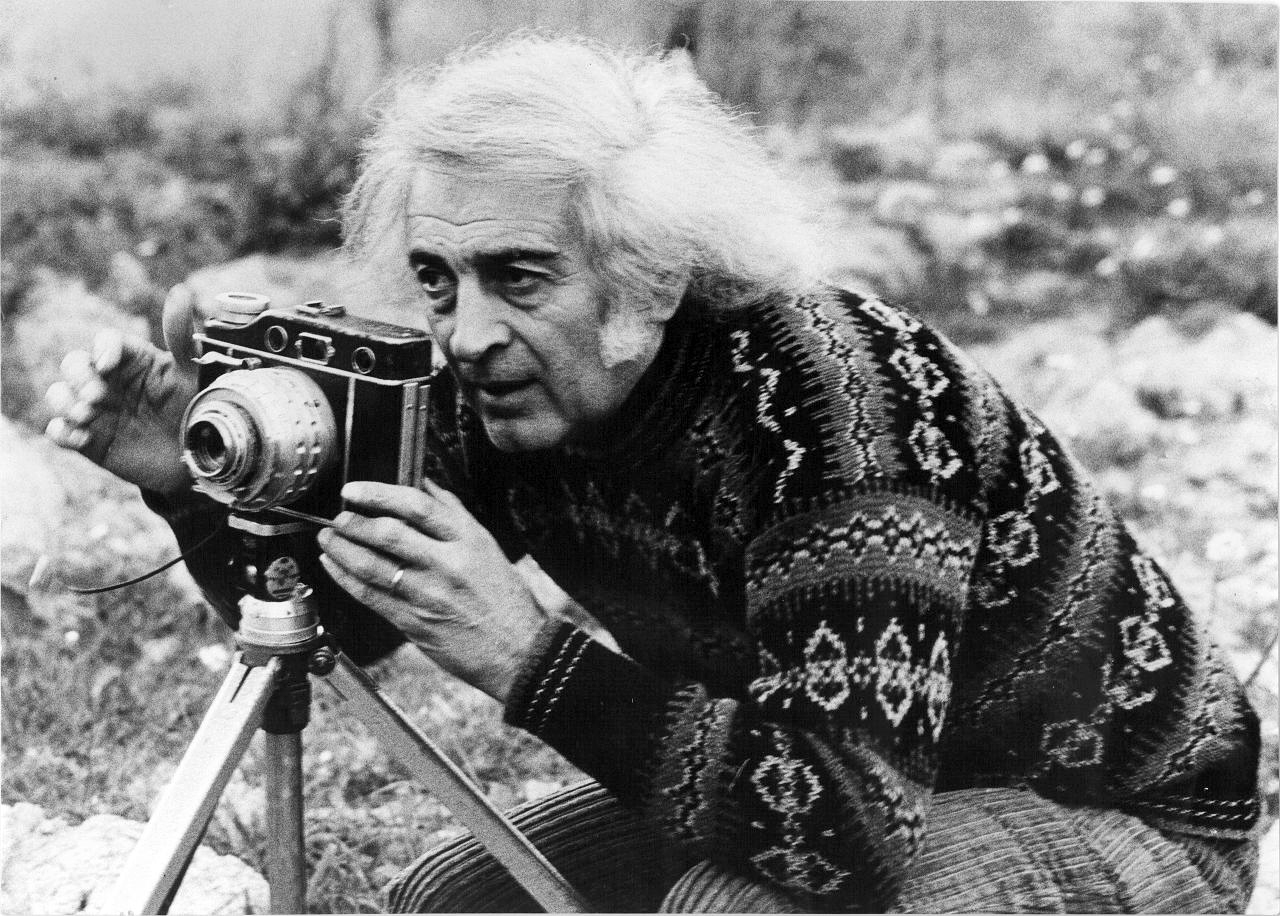
Giacomelli with his Kobell in 1970.

Mario Giacomelli (1 August 1925 – 25 November 2000) was an Italian photographer and photojournalist in the genre of humanism.

== Biography ==
Giacomelli was born in the seaport town of Senigallia in the Marche region of Italy into a family of modest means. Only nine when his father died, the boy left high school at the age of 13 to work as a typesetter and spent his weekends painting and writing poetry. After the horrors of World War II, from 1953 on he turned to the more immediate medium of photography and joined the photography group Misa, formed that year. After pre-war years dominated by a Pictorialist aesthetic promoted by the Fascist government, these artists enjoyed experimenting with form. He wandered the streets and fields of post-war Italy, inspired by the gritty Neo-Realist films of Vittorio De Sica and Roberto Rossellini, and influenced by the renowned Italian photographer Giuseppe Cavalli, founder of Misa, and developing a style characterized by radical compositions, bold cropping and stark contrasts.

In 1955 he was discovered in Italy by Paolo Monti, and beginning in 1963, became known outside Italy through John Szarkowski of the Museum of Modern Art, New York.

== Technique ==
Giacomelli's technique is distinctive. After beginning with the popular and robust Comet 127 film-format viewfinder camera, made in Italy by CMF Bencini from 1948 into the 1950s, in 1954 he bought a second-hand Kobell, a larger coupled rangefinder camera for 6x9 plates and film, one of only about 400 made by Boniforti and Ballerio in Milan from about 1952, and modified it himself. He was unafraid of exploiting the double-exposure capability of its Compur shutter, as well as soft focus, camera movement and slow shutter speeds. His images are high-contrast, quite unlike the modulated full tonal range of his mentor Cavalli, and are the result of using electronic flash, from overdevelopment of his film and compensatory heavy printing so that nearly-black forms 'float' against a white ground. In accounting for these choices he referred to his printing-industry and graphic arts training; "For me the photographic film is like a printing plate, a lithograph, where images and emotions become stratified." After 1986, especially in his 1992–3 series Il pittore Bastari ('The painter Bastari') he artificially included consciously symbolic cardboard masks and toy dogs.

== Series ==
Giacomelli was inspired by the literature of Cesare Pavese, Giacomo Leopardi (a native of Giacomelli's region), and the postwar existentialist Eugenio Montale, giants of Italian writing from which he often borrowed titles for his picture series, such as the confronting, unsentimental pictures he made (1955–57) in an old-people's home, where his mother worked as a washer-woman; Verrà la more e avrà i tuoi occhi ('Death will come and will have your eyes'), taken from a Pavese poem. He wrote his own poetry and his pictures are a reflection of their visual language.

Like other members of Misa, Giacomelli photographed the simple lives of the poor of southern Italy, in 1957 and 1959 visiting Scanno, a small town in the Abruzzo region which Henri Cartier-Bresson had visited only five years before to make quite different pictures.

I was honest towards the people I photographed in Scanno, because it was not my intention to say anything about their social condition. I was involved neither with political issues nor with the trend of seeking misery and poverty which many photographers had towards the south of Italy at that time. In Scanno I just wanted to dream; and I dreamt.

There he produced the image known as Scanno Boy (1957), one of Giacomelli's best-known examples of the emotional effect of his technical innovation. It generates a portentous, 'pittura metafisica' atmosphere from which dark and out-of focus figures emerge, with only one single and central subject that is sharp: a boy in the middle distance who looks into the camera, framed by fleeting, black-haloed foreground figures, and strolling with his hands in his pockets, followed by two other identically dressed old women.

In 1964 this photograph was shown by John Szarkowski in the notable exhibition at the Museum of Modern Art in New York, The Photographer’s Eye (and reproduced in the catalogue in 1966). The photograph is also published in Looking at Photographs. 100 Pictures from the Collection of the Museum of Modern Art New York (also by Szarkowski, 1973).

In 2013 the boy was revealed by Simona Guerra, researcher and niece of Mario Giacomelli, to be Claudio De Cola, and on October 19, 1957, he was exiting the Church of Sant'Antonio da Padova like the people around him, after the Mass. Through several searches through the archives and in the town of Scanno, Guerra "met the parents of the boy, who is now in his sixties and does not live in Scanno anymore. His recognition, confirmed by himself, was also done by his parents. His mother, Teopista, produced several other pictures " of her son, providing "evidence that De Cola was the boy portrayed by Giacomelli."

== Recognition ==
Giacomelli was part of the first showing of Italian photography in the United States when in 1957 the Unione Fotografica Milanese was invited to show Contemporary Italian Photography at the George Eastman House, in Rochester, New York, showcasing 26 photographers. He showed one of his first landscape photographs from a series which he started in 1954 and continued to expand until 2000. Its geometry and abstraction attracted attention.

Giacomelli became one of the most successful Italian photographers in the international scene during the 1970s and 1980s; Nathan Lyons curated shows of his work in 1968 and 1969; then after being promoted by MoMA photography curator John Szarkowski in 1975 he was included in an exhibition at the Victoria and Albert Museum titled The Land organized by Bill Brandt and Mark Haworth-Booth. I Pretini (Little Priests) (1961-1963), a transcription of the everyday life of a group of young priests, resulted from his documentation of post-war Italian seminaries.

== Publications ==
- Ida Gianelli and Antonella Russo, Mario Giacomelli, Castello di Rivoli, Turin, 1992.
- Enzo Carli, Mario Giacomelli: The Inner form. Photographs 1952-1995, Charta Art Books, Milan, 1996.
- Renzo Frontoni. Obiettivo Scanno: Cartier-Bresson, Giacomelli, Monti, Router, Berengo Gardin, Bucce e altri. Riccardo Tanturri, Marsilio, Venice, 1997.
- Ennery Taramelli, Mario Giacomelli, Nathan, Paris, 1998.
- Germano Celant, Mario Giacomelli, Photology, Milan, 2001.
- Sandro Genovali, Mario Giacomelli: Evoking Shadow, Charta Art Books, Milan, 2002.
- Giacinto Di Pietrantonio, Riccardo Lisi, Antonio Ria, Michele Robecchi, Marco Tagliafierro, Born in a Ditch: Enzo Cucchi and Mario Giacomelli, ELR, Losone, Switzerland, 2003.
- Alistair Crawford, Mario Giacomelli, Phaidon Press, London, 2006.
- Roberto Maggiori, Enzo Cucchi & Bruno Giacomelli: Cose Mai Viste, Photology, Milan, 2006.
- Simona Guerra, Mario Giacomelli: My Whole Life, Bruno Mondadori, Milan 2008.
- Alistair Crawford, The Black Is Waiting for the White: Mario Giacomelli Photographs, Contrasto, Milan, 2009.
- Katiuscia Biondi, Mario Giacomelli: Sotto la pelle del reale, 24Ore Cultura, Milan, 2011.
- Katiuscia Biondi, Mario Giacomelli: Je ne fais pas le photographe, je ne sais pas le faire, Contrejour, Biarritz, France, 2016.
- Virginia Heckert, Mario Giacomelli: Figure/Found, Getty, Los Angeles, 2021.
- Questo ricordo lo vorrei raccontare. Skinnerbox, 2024. With text in English and Italian.

== Collections ==
Giacomelli's work is held in a number of permanent public collections:

- Castello di Rivoli, Turin
- Brooklyn Museum, New York City
- Museum of Modern Art, New York
- Art Institute of Chicago
- San Francisco Museum of Modern Art, San Francisco, CA
- Bibliothèque nationale de France, Paris.
- Victoria and Albert Museum, London.
- Pushkin Museum, Moscow.
- Centro Studi e Archivio della Comunicazione at the University of Parma.
- George Eastman Museum, Rochester, New York.
