= Gizio =

Location
- Country: Italy

Physical characteristics
- Source
  - location: near Pettorano sul Gizio
- Mouth: Sagittario
  - coordinates: 42.0646°N 13.8940°E

Basin features
- Progression: Sagittario→ Aterno-Pescara→ Adriatic Sea

The Gizio is a river in Italy. It is located in the province of L'Aquila in the Abruzzo region of southern Italy. The river is the main tributary of the Sagittario. Its source is located near Rocca Pia and Pettorano sul Gizio. The river flows north through the Appennino Abruzzese near Sulmona before entering the Sagittario.
