= Scanno, Abruzzo =

Scanno
- Comune
- Comune di Scanno
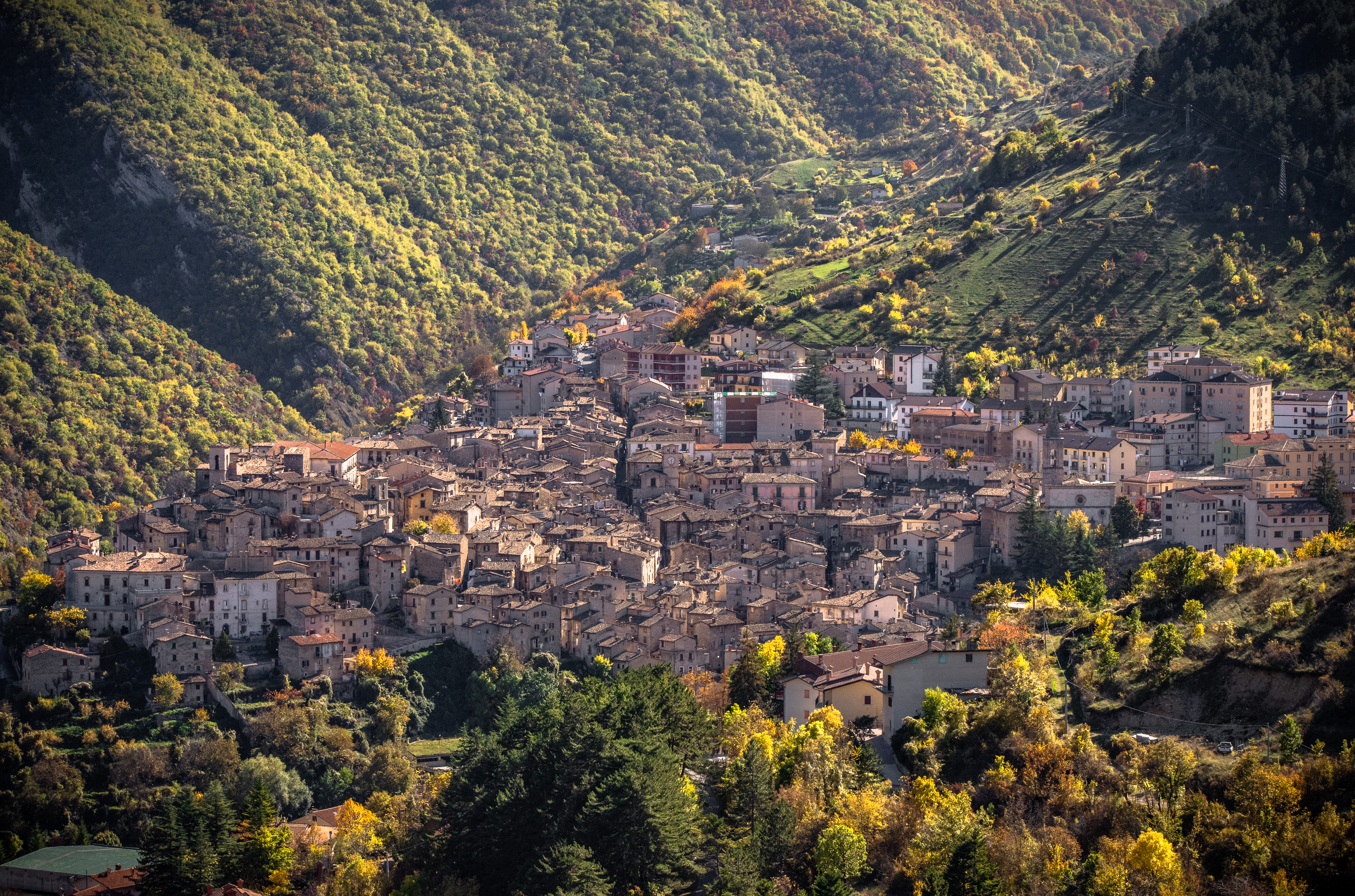

- Location within Italy Location within Abruzzo
- Coordinates: 41°54′7″N 13°53′4″E
- Country: Italy
- Region: Abruzzo
- Province: L'Aquila (AQ)
- Frazioni: Frattura

Government
  - Mayor: Giovanni Mastrogiovann

Area
  - Total: 134.68 km^{2} (52.00 sq mi)
- Elevation: 1,050 m (3,440 ft)

Population (28 February 2015)
  - Total: 1,883
  - Density: 13.98/km^{2} (36.21/sq mi)
- Demonym: Scannesi
- Time zone: UTC+1 (CET)
  - Summer (DST): UTC+2 (CEST)
- Postal code: 67038
- Dialing code: 0864
- Patron saint: St. Eustace
- Saint day: 20 September
- Website: Official website

Scanno (Abruzzese: Scannë) is a town and district in the province of L'Aquila, within the Abruzzo region of southern Italy. It is one of I Borghi più belli d'Italia ("The most beautiful villages of Italy").

The town is bordered by Anversa degli Abruzzi, Barrea, Bisegna, Bugnara, Civitella Alfedena, Introdacqua, Opi, Pescasseroli, Pettorano sul Gizio, Rivisondoli, Rocca Pia, Villalago and Villetta Barrea.

== History ==
Situated in the Sagittario Valley and encircled by the Majella mountains, Scanno has been immortalised by photographers Henri Cartier-Bresson (1951) and Mario Giacomelli (1957–59) and, according to Edward Lear, was host to Italy's most beautiful women.

Local legend has it that Scanno's natural lake (Lago di Scanno - stocked with pike and perch and Abruzzo’s largest natural basin) was created by a feud between a white witch and a sorcerer, the lake marking the spot where the witch finally fell.

== People ==
For a brief period during World War II, future Italian president Carlo Azeglio Ciampi was a refugee in the town.

Quinto Mancini (1893–1963), the father of American composer Henry Mancini, was born in Scanno on 13 March 1893 and later emigrated to America.

== Main sites ==
- Hermitage of Sant'Egidio
- Sant'Antonio da Padova
- Santa Maria della Valle or Chiesa Matrice
- Madonna di Constatinopoli

== Climate ==
Climate data for Scanno, elevation 1,030 m (3,380 ft), (1951–2000)
Month	Jan	Feb	Mar	Apr	May	Jun	Jul	Aug	Sep	Oct	Nov	Dec	Year
Record high °C (°F)	18.0 (64.4)	20.5 (68.9)	25.0 (77.0)	26.8 (80.2)	30.2 (86.4)	36.6 (97.9)	37.3 (99.1)	39.1 (102.4)	34.9 (94.8)	28.3 (82.9)	23.0 (73.4)	18.0 (64.4)	39.1 (102.4)
Mean daily maximum °C (°F)	5.1 (41.2)	6.3 (43.3)	9.5 (49.1)	13.5 (56.3)	18.6 (65.5)	22.9 (73.2)	26.4 (79.5)	26.1 (79.0)	21.6 (70.9)	15.5 (59.9)	9.9 (49.8)	6.1 (43.0)	15.1 (59.2)
Daily mean °C (°F)	1.6 (34.9)	2.3 (36.1)	4.9 (40.8)	8.3 (46.9)	12.8 (55.0)	16.5 (61.7)	19.3 (66.7)	19.2 (66.6)	15.7 (60.3)	10.8 (51.4)	6.2 (43.2)	2.8 (37.0)	10.0 (50.1)
Mean daily minimum °C (°F)	−1.9 (28.6)	−1.7 (28.9)	0.4 (32.7)	3.2 (37.8)	7.1 (44.8)	10.1 (50.2)	12.3 (54.1)	12.4 (54.3)	9.9 (49.8)	6.1 (43.0)	2.4 (36.3)	−0.5 (31.1)	5.0 (41.0)
Record low °C (°F)	−16.0 (3.2)	−16.0 (3.2)	−16.0 (3.2)	−9.4 (15.1)	−4.5 (23.9)	0.2 (32.4)	2.2 (36.0)	2.4 (36.3)	0.7 (33.3)	−4.3 (24.3)	−10.5 (13.1)	−14.0 (6.8)	−16.0 (3.2)
Average precipitation mm (inches)	99.5 (3.92)	105.2 (4.14)	90.9 (3.58)	88.5 (3.48)	72.1 (2.84)	56.1 (2.21)	42.7 (1.68)	42.5 (1.67)	70.1 (2.76)	109.9 (4.33)	156.8 (6.17)	146.9 (5.78)	1,081.2 (42.56)
Average precipitation days	10.2	9.6	10.2	10.9	10.2	7.6	5.5	5.4	6.9	9.4	11.6	11.6	109.1
Source: Regione Abruzzo
