= Frattura =

Coordinates: 41°55′50″N 13°52′13″E

- Frazione
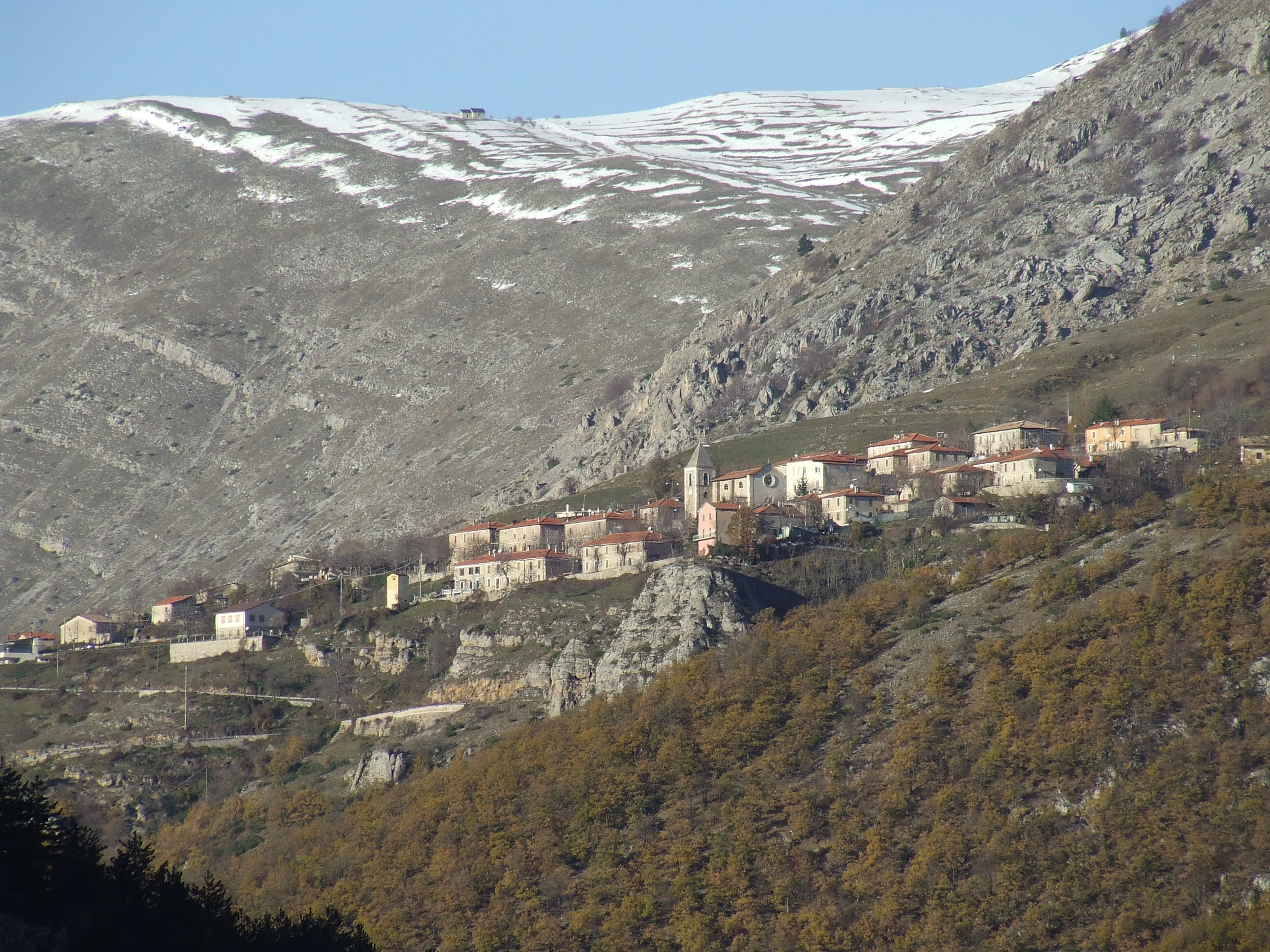
- Frattura
- Interactive map of Frattura
- Country: Italy
- Region: Abruzzo
- Province: L'Aquila
- Commune: Scanno
- Time zone: UTC+1 (CET)
  - Summer (DST): UTC+2 (CEST)

Frattura is a frazione of Scanno, in the Province of L'Aquila in the Abruzzo, region of Italy.
