= Hermitage of Sant'Egidio =

Religious building in Abruzzo, Italy

Coordinates: 41.9124°N 13.8747°E

- Eremo di Sant'Egidio
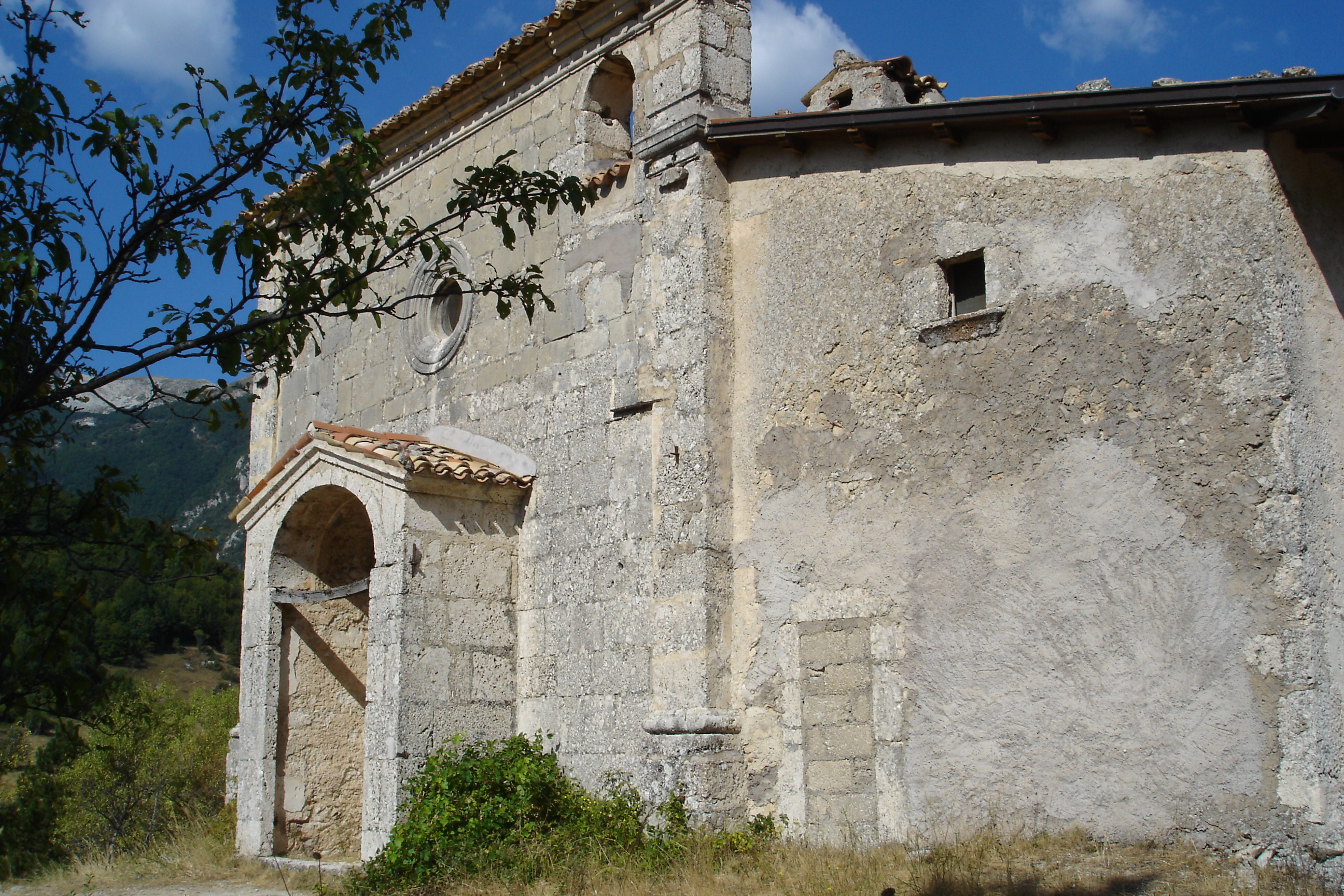
- View of the hermitage

- Location within Abruzzo

Religion
- Affiliation: Roman Catholic
- Province: Province of L'Aquila
- Region: Abruzzo

Location
- Municipality: Scanno
- State: Italy
- Interactive map of Hermitage of Sant'Egidio

Architecture
- Groundbreaking: No later than 1612

Eremo di Sant'Egidio (Italian: Hermitage of Saint Giles) is an hermitage located in Scanno, Province of L'Aquila (Abruzzo, Italy). It is located on the hill of the same name and dedicated to the Sant'Egidio (Italian: Saint Giles).

== History ==
The exact date of construction of the building is unknown. The first mention of it dates back to 1612.

In 1780 the church was restored by Pasquale Mancinelli, Michele Parente, and Nicola Ricciotti.

== Architecture ==
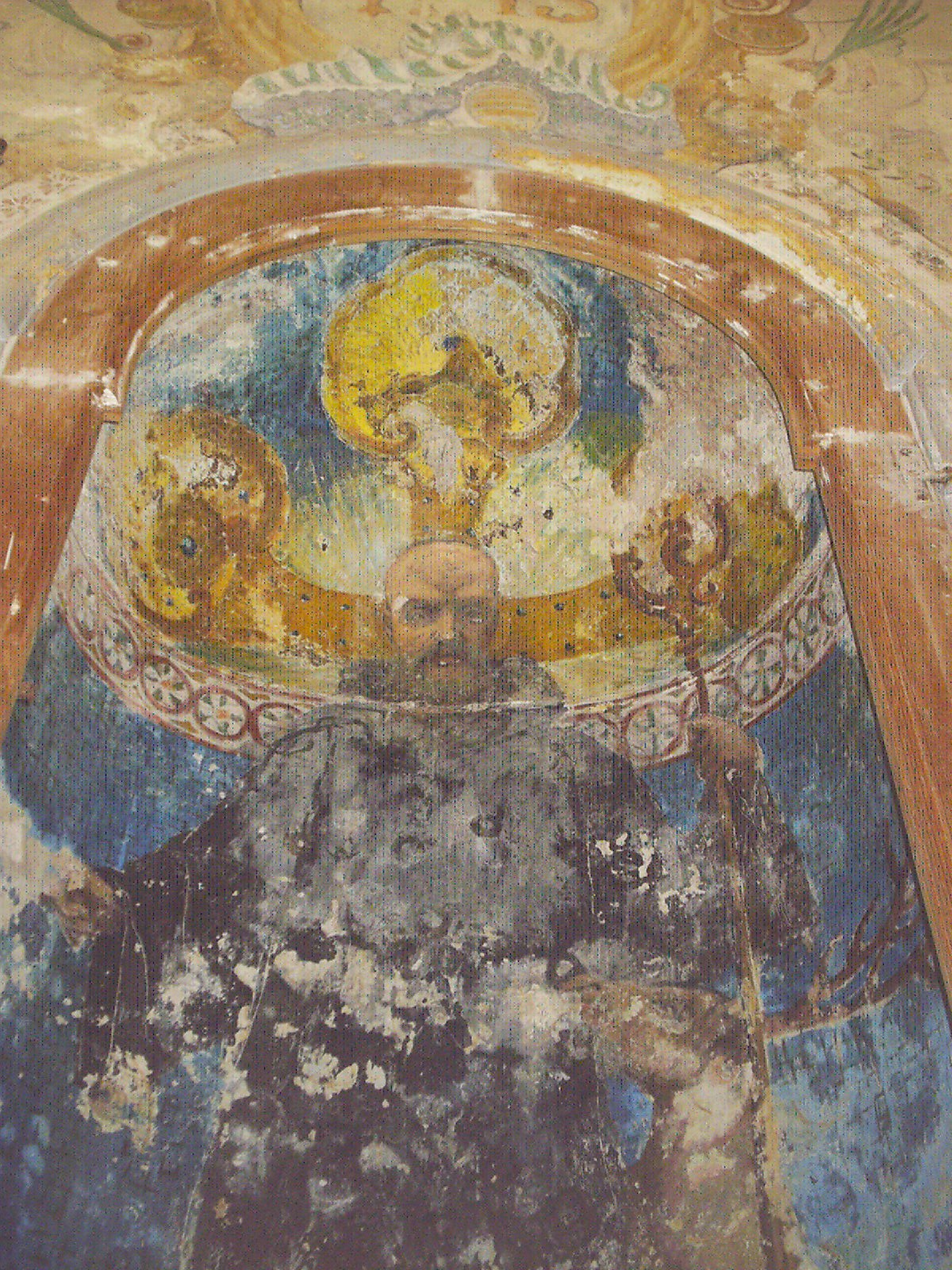
The fresco of St. Giles inside the hermitage.

The building, in rural Romanesque style, has a quadrangular facade with a small compartment for the bell carved out of an upper corner. The entrance is surmounted by a small circular window. The door lintel bears an inscription dated 1675, the year the town invoked the Saint's help to overcome the plague. Another inscription, inside a coat of arms above the entrance, contains the date and names of the three citizens of Scanno who promoted the 1780 restoration.

The interior of the single-nave church holds a simple altar with side niches surrounded by cornices and, near the entrance, two stoups depicting masks with faces of fantastic animals. On the altar is a fresco of the saint. The floor is made of simple bricks.

== See also ==
- Saint Giles
- Lago di Scanno
