= Hermitage of San Domenico =

Hermitage in Villalogo, Italy

Coordinates: 41.9425°N 13.8283°E

- Eremo di San Domenico
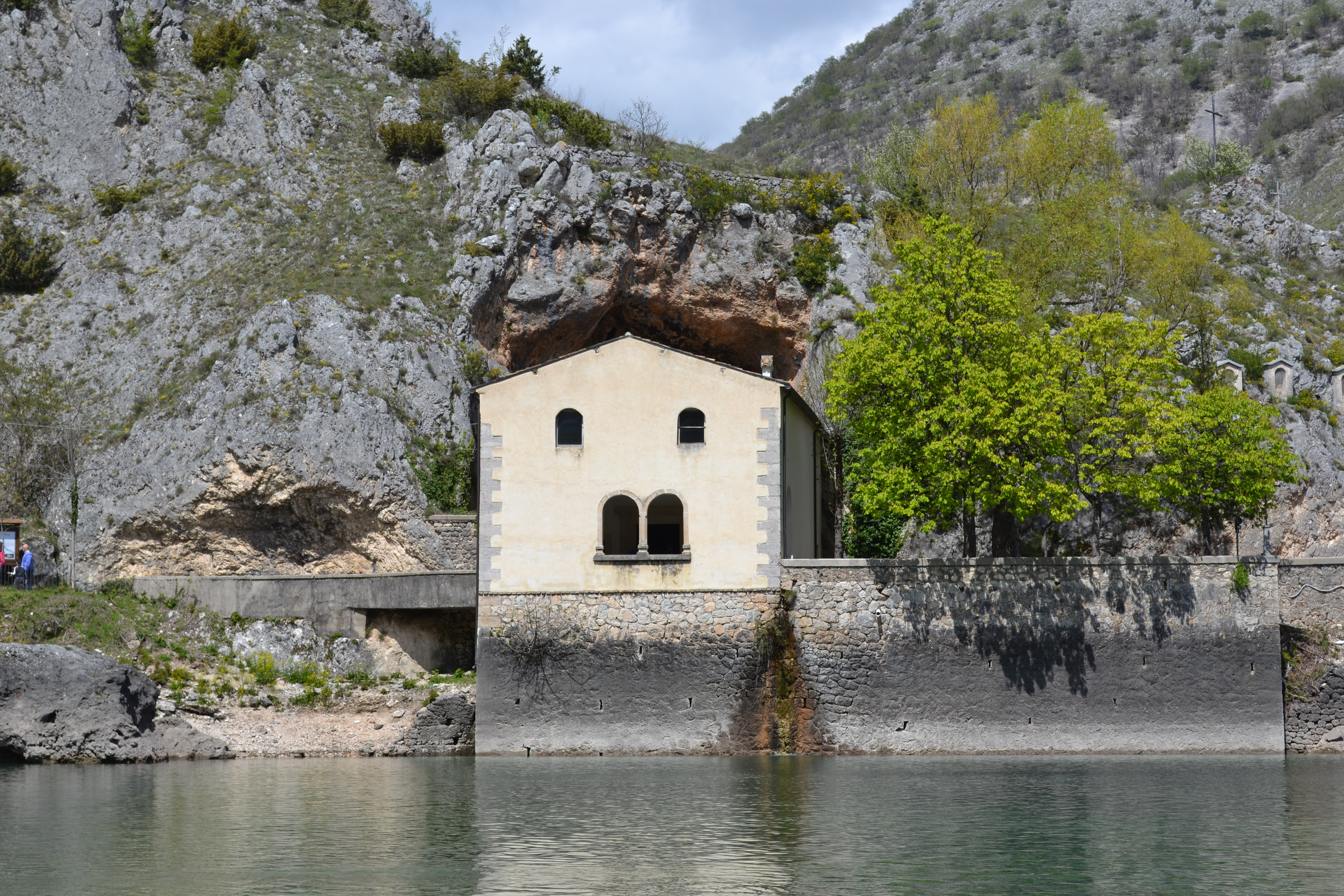
- View of the hermitage

- Location within Abruzzo

Religion
- Affiliation: Roman Catholic
- Province: Province of L'Aquila
- Region: Abruzzo

Location
- Municipality: Villalago
- State: Italy
- Interactive map of Hermitage of San Domenico

Architecture
- Completed: 10th-century

Eremo di San Domenico (Italian for Hermitage of San Domenico) is an hermitage located in Villalago, Province of L'Aquila (Abruzzo, Italy).

== History ==
The hermitage comprises a cave carved into the limestone rock, where, according to tradition, around the year 1000, the Benedictine monk Saint Dominic of Sora dwelled. Initially, the monk was hosted at the now-lost Benedictine monastery of San Pietro de Lacu, and later, he went to nearby Cocullo, where he healed a girl bitten by a snake. Along the way, he also tamed a wolf that had taken an infant from its cradle while the parents were chopping wood in the forest. This miracle is depicted in votive paintings on the porch of the hermitage.

The actual hermitage was constructed around the 15th century when the cult of Saint Dominic spread. Before the construction of the dam and the subsequent formation of the lake in 1929, the hermitage had a different exterior, with a double-arched portico and a recessed facade with a large window, and it was accessible by a medieval bridge in poor condition. With the dam's construction, a new stone bridge in a faux medieval style was built, and the hermitage's facade was reconstructed.

== Architecture ==
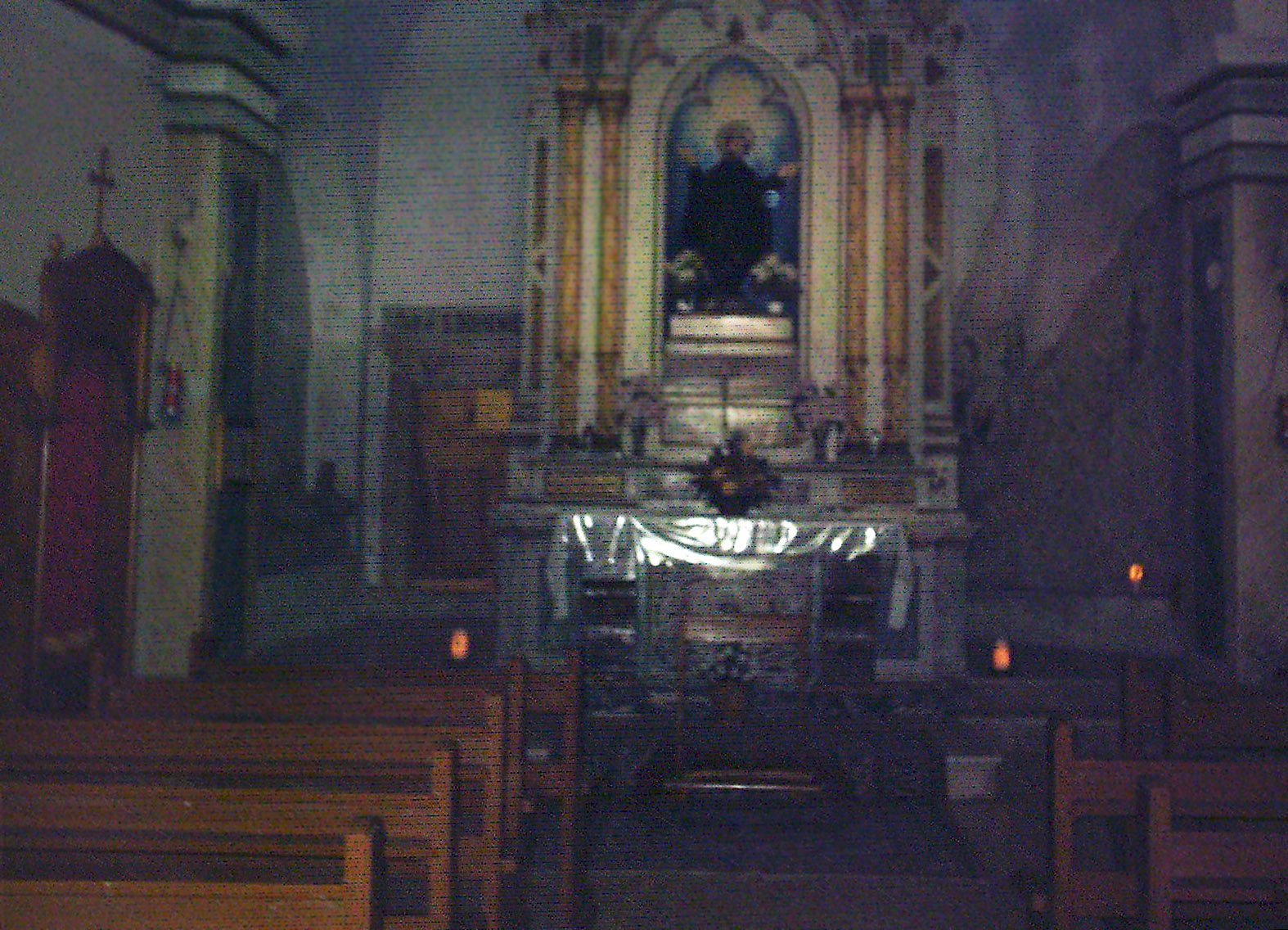
Interior of the church

The church is accessed through a 17th-century portico, decorated with four paintings from 1938 by the local artist Alfredo Gentile, depicting scenes from the saint's life and focusing on various miracles.

The church has a single nave. The neo-Gothic style altar is notable, with a wooden statue of Saint Dominic in a niche and a marble paliotto from 1761 at its base, created by Giuseppe Mancini commissioned by Francesco Iafolla, a hermit from Villalago.

On the right side of the nave, within a niche carved into the supporting wall, there is a painting of the Madonna and Child dating back to the early 19th century. The church houses other works by Alfredo Gentile, including "Saint Dominic Abbot saving a possessed woman," "Saint Anthony of Padua with Child," "Madonna and Child," and "Saint Francis speaking to the wolf," placed in various locations and all completed in 1969.

== Bibliography ==
- AA.VV. (2000). "Grotta di San Domenico". Eremi d'Abruzzo. Guida ai luoghi di culto rupestri. Pescara: Carsa Edizioni. pp. 118–119. ISBN 88-85854-74-5.
- Angelo Caranfa (2011). "Alta Valle del Sagittario". In Vienna Tordone (ed.). Thomas Ashby. Viaggi in Abruzzo (1901-1923). Cinisello Balsamo: Silvana Editoriale. pp. 201–204.
- Maria Rosaria Gatta; Enrico Domenico Grossi; Angelo Caranfa (2011). "Il luogo del ritrovamento. Profilo storico dell'eremo di San Domenico Abate". Il Santo nascosto. Studio e restauro di una ritrovata immagine di San Domenico Abate a Villalago. Villalago: Associazione culturale "Villalago inFlaturno". pp. 10–32.
