= Pettorano sul Gizio =

- Comune
- Comune di Pettorano sul Gizio
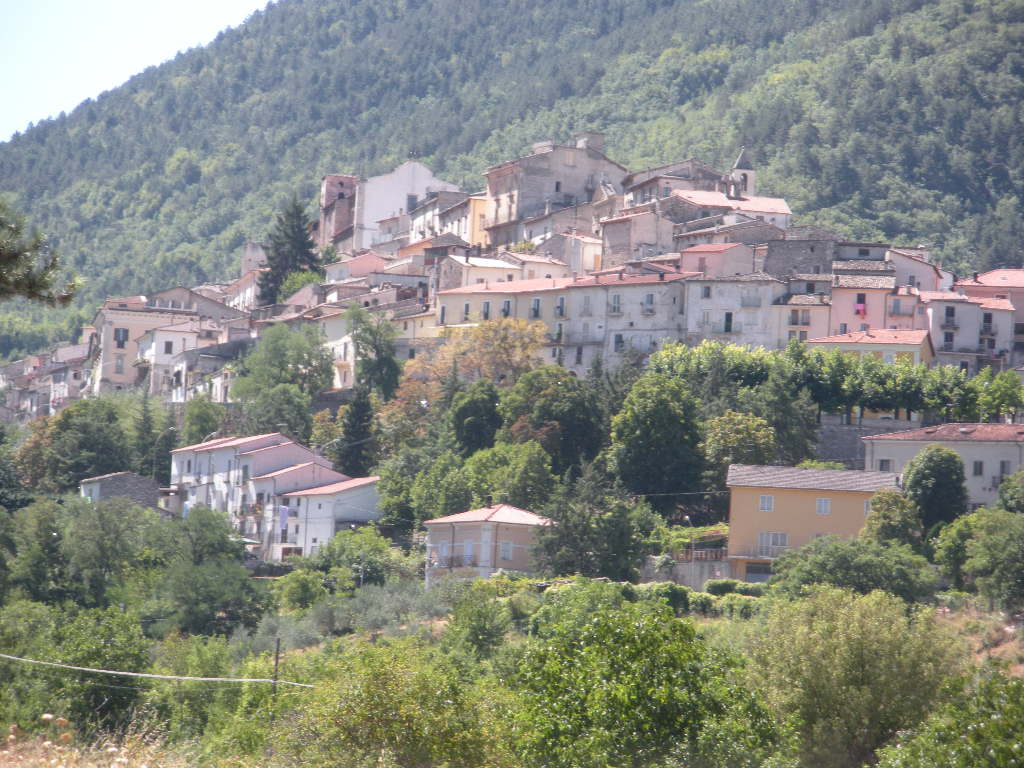

- Location within Italy Location within Abruzzo
- Coordinates: 41°58′32″N 13°57′35″E
- Country: Italy
- Region: Abruzzo
- Province: L'Aquila (AQ)
- Frazioni: Conca, Frascate, Vallelarga, Vallepescara

Government
  - Mayor: Pasquale Franciosa

Area
  - Total: 62.85 km^{2} (24.27 sq mi)
- Elevation: 625 m (2,051 ft)

Population (31 December 2015)
  - Total: 1,376
  - Density: 21.89/km^{2} (56.70/sq mi)
- Demonym: Pettoranesi
- Time zone: UTC+1 (CET)
  - Summer (DST): UTC+2 (CEST)
- Postal code: 67034
- Dialing code: 0864
- ISTAT code: 066071
- Patron saint: Santa Margherita
- Saint day: 13 July
- Website: Official website

Pettorano sul Gizio is a comune and town in the province of L'Aquila in the Abruzzo region of southern Italy. The Gizio river flows in the communal territory. It is one of I Borghi più belli d'Italia ("The most beautiful villages of Italy").

== Notable people ==
Frederick of Pettorano
Baron Michele Leone (1909-1988) - professional wrestler

== See also ==
Cantelmo Castle
