= Lago di Scanno =

Lake in Abruzzo, Italy

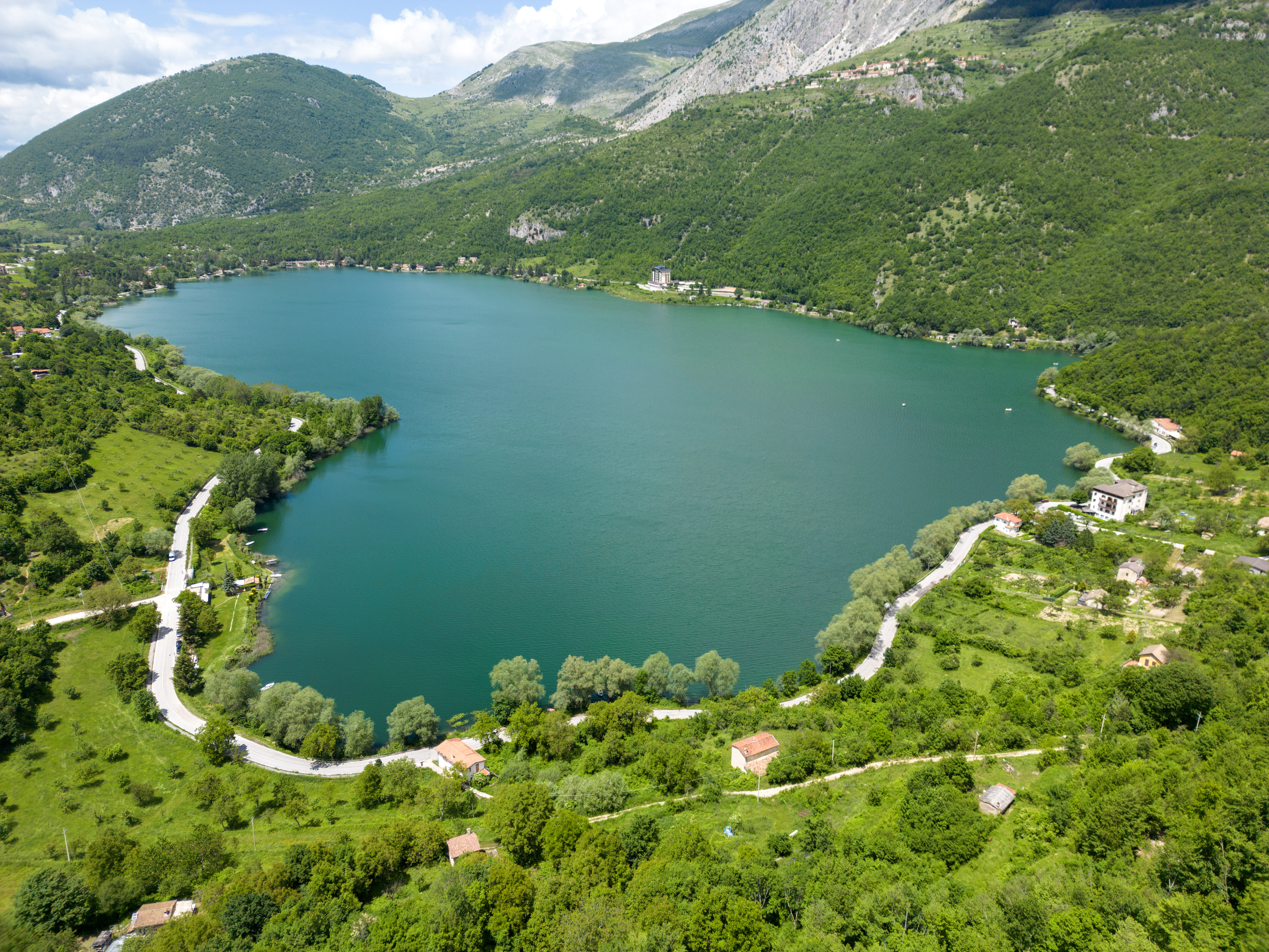

- Location within Italy Location within Europe
- Location: Province of L'Aquila, Abruzzo
- Coordinates: 41.92°N 13.864°E
- Primary inflows: The portion of the Sagittario known as the Tasso
- Primary outflows: Sagittario
- Basin countries: Italy
- Surface elevation: 930 m (3,050 ft)

Lago di Scanno is a lake in the Province of L'Aquila, Abruzzo, Italy. It is located in the Appennino Abruzzese north of Parco Nazionale d'Abruzzo, Lazio e Molise. On its southern shore is Scanno and on its northern shore is Villalago. The Sagittario flows out of the lake towards the north. The part of the Sagittario river that flows into the lake from the south is known as the Tasso.

It is of the shape of a heart.

== See also ==
- Hermitage of Sant'Egidio
