= Valle Peligna =

Plateau in southern Italy

Coordinates: 42°04′49″N 13°53′16″E

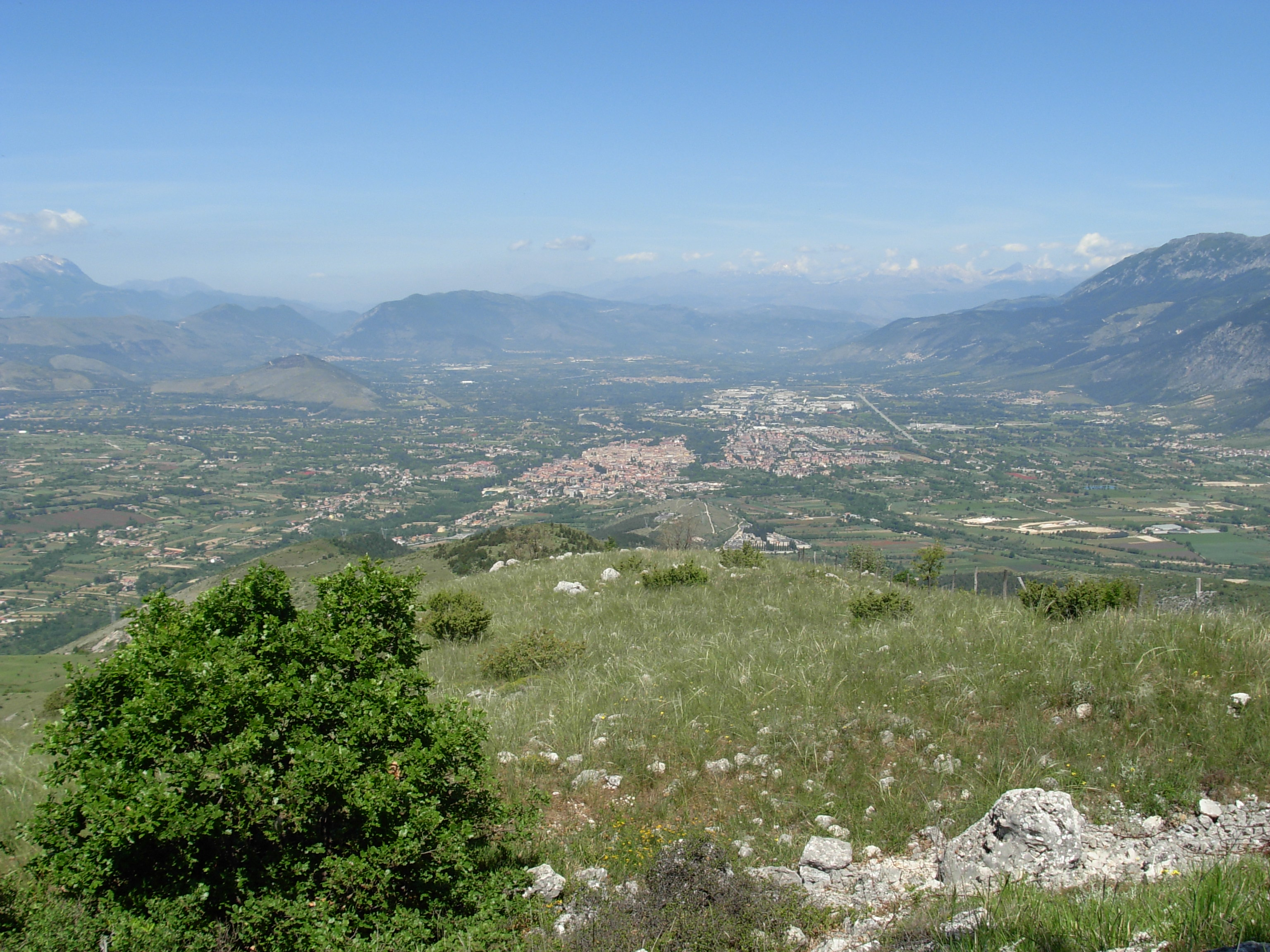
View of Valle Peligna.

The Valle Peligna, also known as Conca di Sulmona, is a plateau in central Abruzzo, southern Italy, included in the province of L'Aquila. It has a surface of some 100 km^{2}.

The valley takes its name from the Paeligni. In prehistoric times, it was occupied by a lake which disappeared after a series of earthquakes approximately 300,000 years ago, leaving the land full of marshes but fertile. The former barrier between the lake and the sea was in what are now the gorges of Popoli. Three hills near Sulmona are the relics of the single island in the lake.

The valley is crossed by the rivers Aterno and Sagittario. In addition to Sulmona, the main centers in the plateau include Raiano, Vittorito, Corfinio, Pratola Peligna and Pacentro.

Historically, it was inhabited by the Paeligni, an Oscan tribe.
