= Aterno-Pescara =

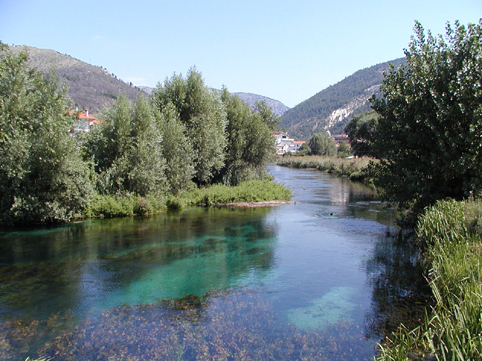
- The Pescara river

Location
- Country: Italy

Physical characteristics
- Source
  - location: Monti della Laga
  - elevation: 1,200 m (3,900 ft)
- Mouth: Adriatic Sea
  - location: Pescara
  - coordinates: 42°28′11″N 14°13′47″E
- Length: 152 km (94 mi)
- Basin size: 3,190 km^{2} (1,230 sq mi)
- Discharge
  - average: 57 m^{3}/s (2,000 cu ft/s) at the mouth

The Aterno-Pescara (ancient Aternus from the Greek Aternos, Άτερνος) is a river system in Abruzzo, eastern central Italy. The river is known as the Aterno near its source in the mountains, but takes the name Pescara, actually a tributary, nearer the city of Pescara and the Adriatic Sea.

Having the greatest discharge basin of the rivers flowing into the Adriatic Sea south of the Reno, the Aterno has its origin in the Monti della Laga, near Montereale and Lago di Campotosto in the province of L'Aquila. The river flows in a southeastern direction past Pizzoli, L'Aquila, Paganica, San Demetrio ne' Vestini, and Castelvecchio Subequo through the Appennino Abruzzese mountains. It subsequently flows until the Valle Peligna (or Sulmona plateau) near Raiano, where it curves northward and receives its main tributary, the Sagittario. Later, near Popoli, it crosses the border into the province of Pescara and joins with the short, but large volumed, Pescara, by which name it is thenceforth usually known. The river flows in a northeast direction past Tocco da Casauria and Torre de' Passeri before forming the border between the province of Pescara and the province of Chieti for a short distance. It flows into the Adriatic Sea at the city of Pescara.
