= Villalago =

- Comune
- Comune di Villalago
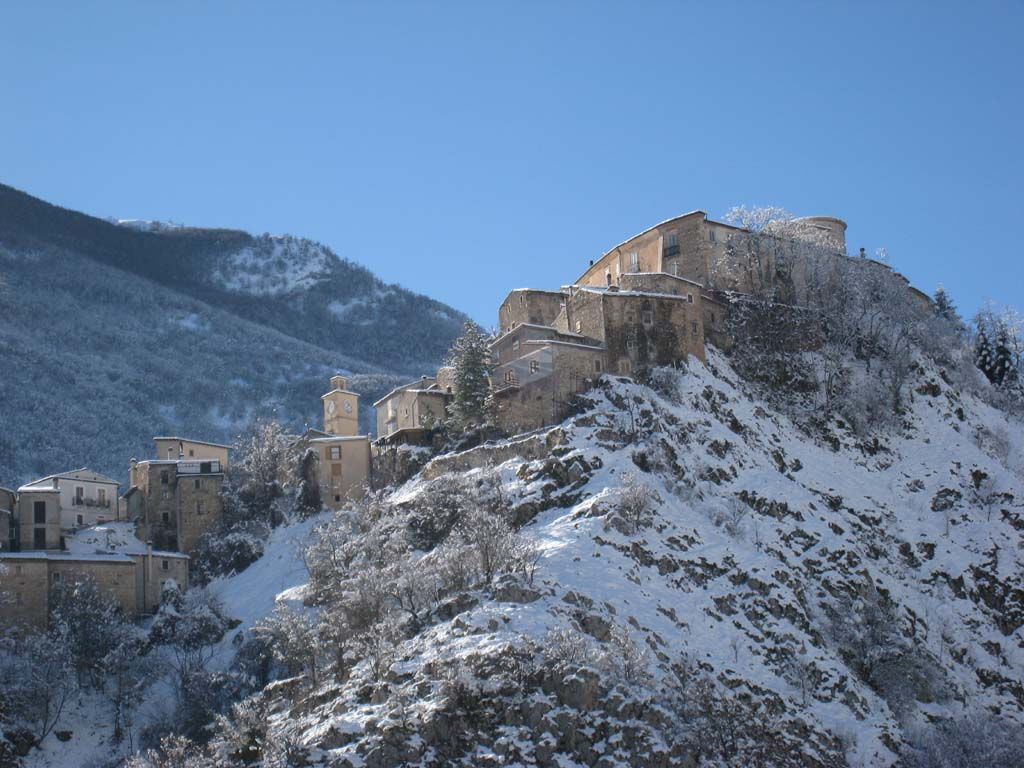

- Location within Italy Location within Abruzzo
- Coordinates: 41°56′9″N 13°50′34″E
- Country: Italy
- Region: Abruzzo
- Province: L'Aquila (AQ)
- Frazioni: Villalago Riviera

Government
  - Mayor: Fernando Gatta (Noi Stiamo Con Villalago)

Area
  - Total: 35.33 km^{2} (13.64 sq mi)
- Elevation: 930 m (3,050 ft)

Population (2007)
  - Total: 616
  - Density: 17.4/km^{2} (45.2/sq mi)
- Demonym: Villalaghesi
- Time zone: UTC+1 (CET)
  - Summer (DST): UTC+2 (CEST)
- Postal code: 67030
- Dialing code: 0864
- ISTAT code: 066103
- Patron saint: San Domenico abate
- Saint day: 22 August
- Website: Official website

Villalago (Abruzzese: La Vìlla) is a comune and town in the province of L'Aquila in the Abruzzo region of Italy. It is one of I Borghi più belli d'Italia ("The most beautiful villages of Italy").

== See also ==
- Rocca di Villalago
- Hermitage of San Domenico
