= Sagittario (river) =

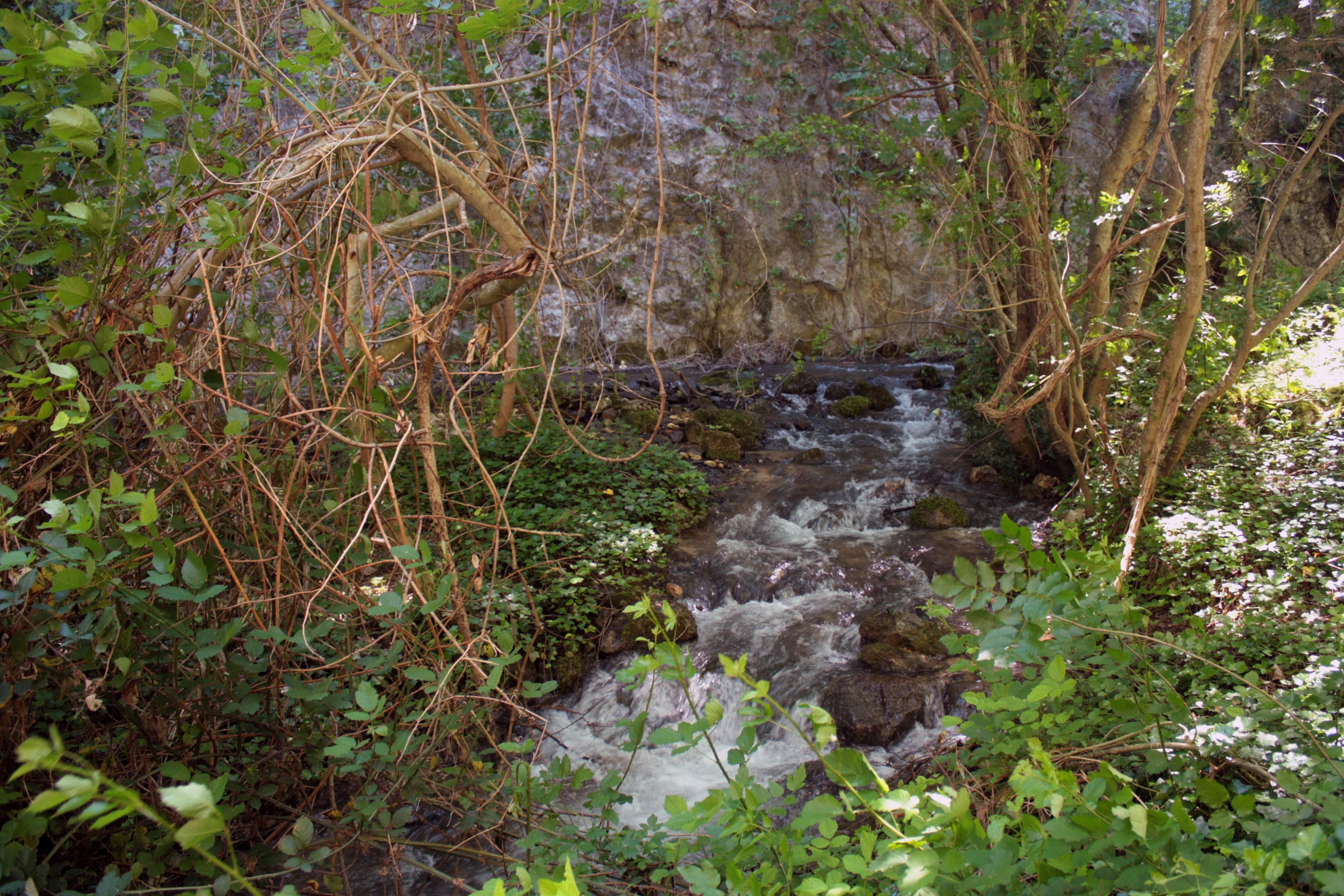

Location
- Country: Italy

Physical characteristics
- Source
  - location: near Scanno
- Mouth: Aterno
  - location: near Popoli
  - coordinates: 42.1524°N 13.8278°E

Basin features
- Progression: Aterno-Pescara→ Adriatic Sea
- Tributaries
  - right: Gizio

The Sagittario is a river in Italy. It is located primarily in the province of L'Aquila in the Abruzzo region of southern Italy. The river is the main tributary of the Aterno-Pescara. Its source is located near Parco Nazionale d'Abruzzo, Lazio e Molise and Scanno. The river flows into Lago di Scanno near Scanno and flows out of the lake near Villalago. The portion of the river that enters the lake is known as the Tasso. The Sagittario flows north through the Appennino Abruzzese near Villalago, Bugnara, Sulmona and Pratola Peligna. It enters the Aterno-Pescara near Raiano and Popoli on the border with the province of Pescara.
