= Monte Porrara =

Mountain in Abruzzo, Italy

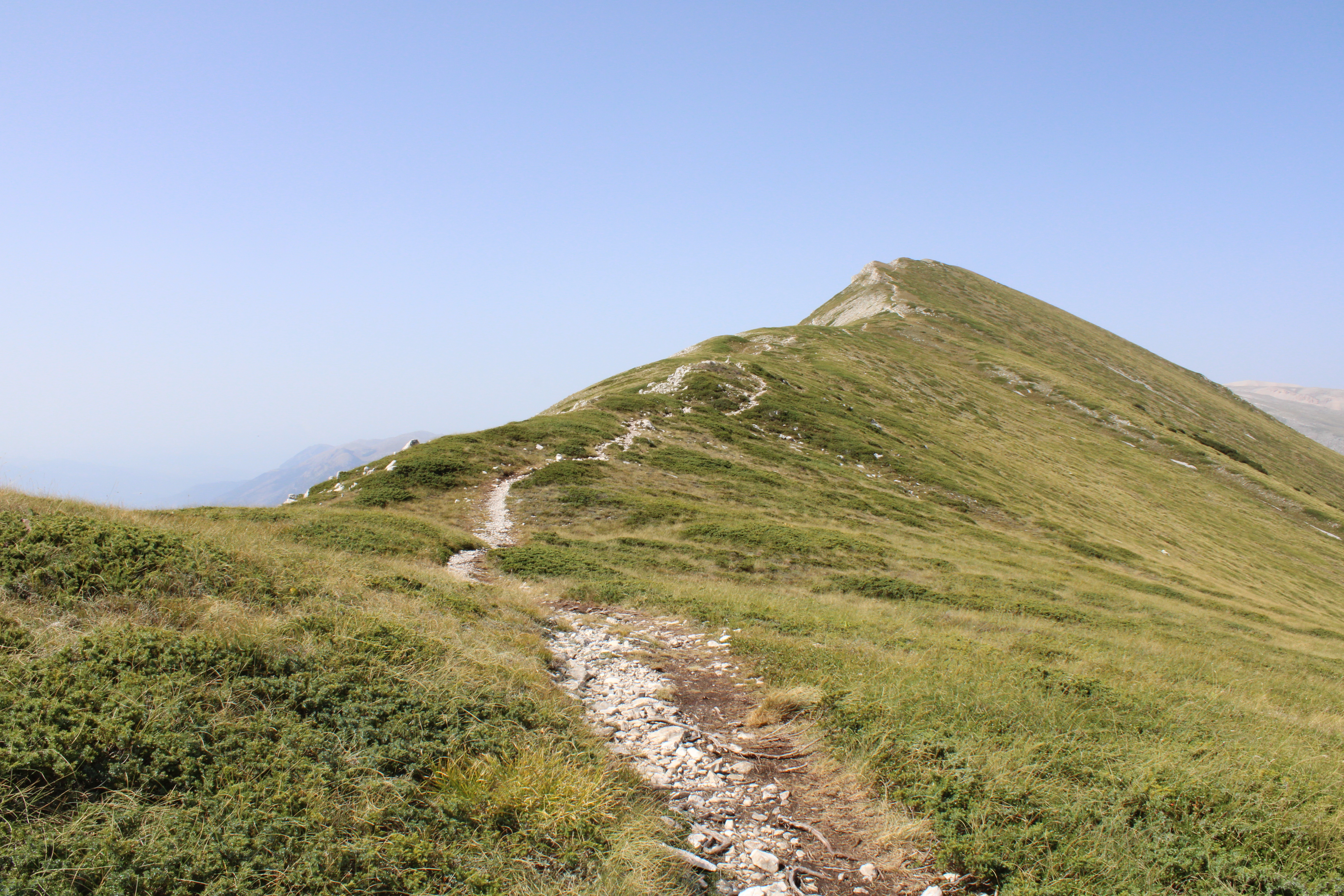
- View of Mount Porrara with the southern subpeak in front

Highest point
- Elevation: 2,137 m (7,011 ft)
- Prominence: 477 m (1,565 ft)
- Isolation: 5.59 km (3.47 mi)
- Coordinates: 41°57′57″N 14°05′46″E

Geography
- Location within Italy
- Location: Abruzzo; Province of Chieti; Province of L'Aquila; Campo di Giove, Palena
- Country: Italy
- Parent range: Apennine Mountains

Mount Porrara (2137 m a.s.l.) is a mountain in the Abruzzi Apennines, located between the lower province of L'Aquila and the province of Chieti, a natural geomorphological continuation south of the Maiella, included in the Maiella National Park.

== Description ==
=== Geography ===
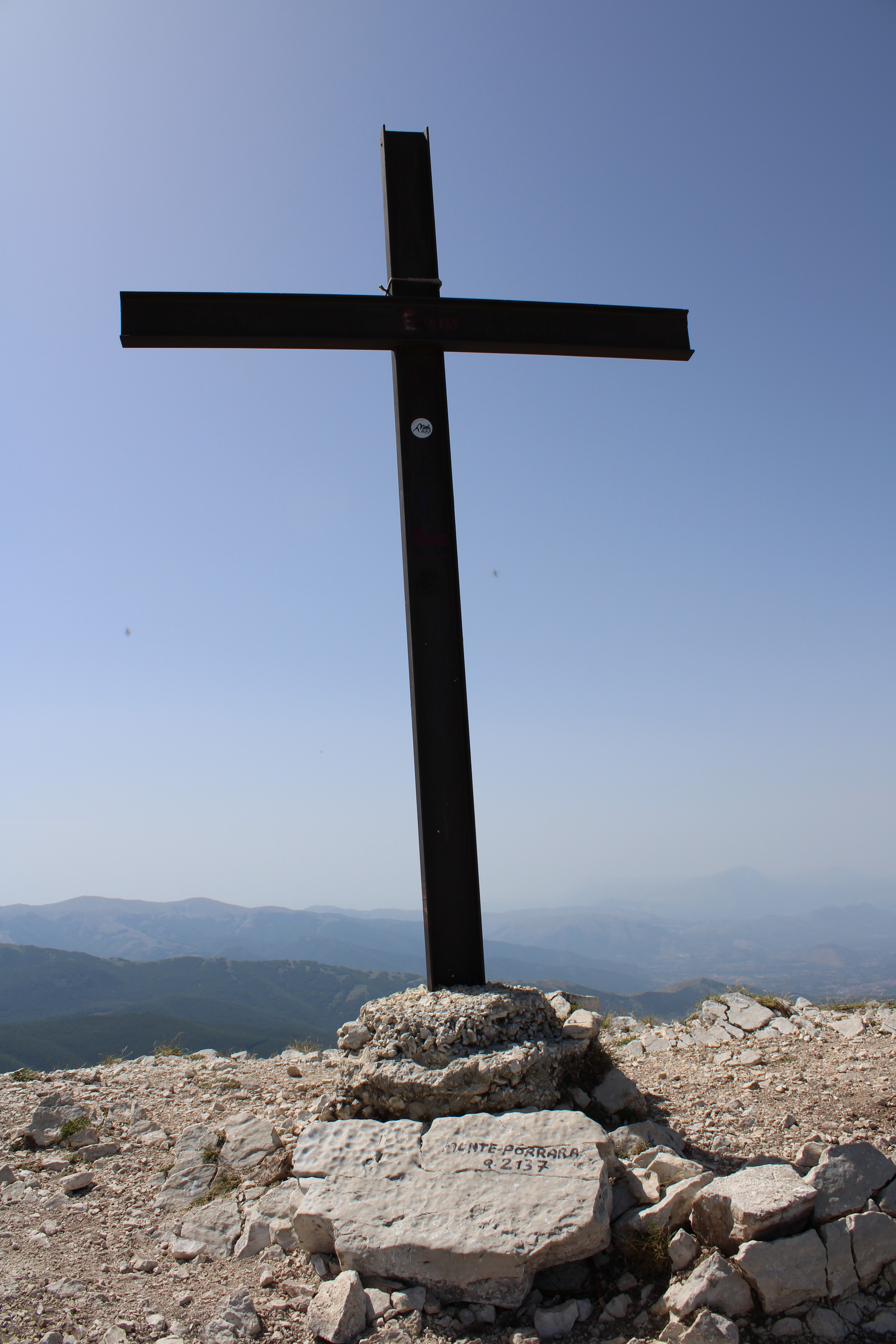
Cross present on the summit of Mount Porrara

Its ridge develops for 9 km, in a north-south course from the Coccia ford (1674 m), the pass that joins it to the Maiella massif, to the vicinity of the Fork Pass (1276 m), from which the Quarto Santa Chiara plateau opens. More precisely, its ridge includes, in its north-south development, in order, the following peaks: the summit of the La Paradina rock wall (1969 m), the north subpeak of Mount Porrara (1935 m), the Ogniquota summit (2100 m), Mount Pareti Rosse (2040 m), the summit of Mount Porrara (2137 m), the south subpeak of Mount Porrara (2092 m), and Mount Malvone (or Molione) (1729 m), coinciding with the plain and sierra of the same name. Part of its territory falls within the perimeter of the Quarto Santa Chiara Nature Reserve. Administratively, the two slopes of the mountain are included in the territory of the municipalities of Palena (eastern slope) and Campo di Giove (western slope), with its summit falling a few meters within the municipal territory of the latter, both of which are part of the Maiella National Park. On its eastern slopes rises the Aventino River (springs of Capo di Fiume, fed by waters flowing from the Quarto Santa Chiara plateau located to the west), in the municipal territory of Palena, which originates the valley of the same name that opens eastward to the Adriatic Sea, while on its western slopes the Cerreto plain separates it from Mount Pizzalto (1966 m). The rocks of the mountain are limestone.

=== Flora and fauna ===
The Marsican iris, a flower species endemic to the mount.

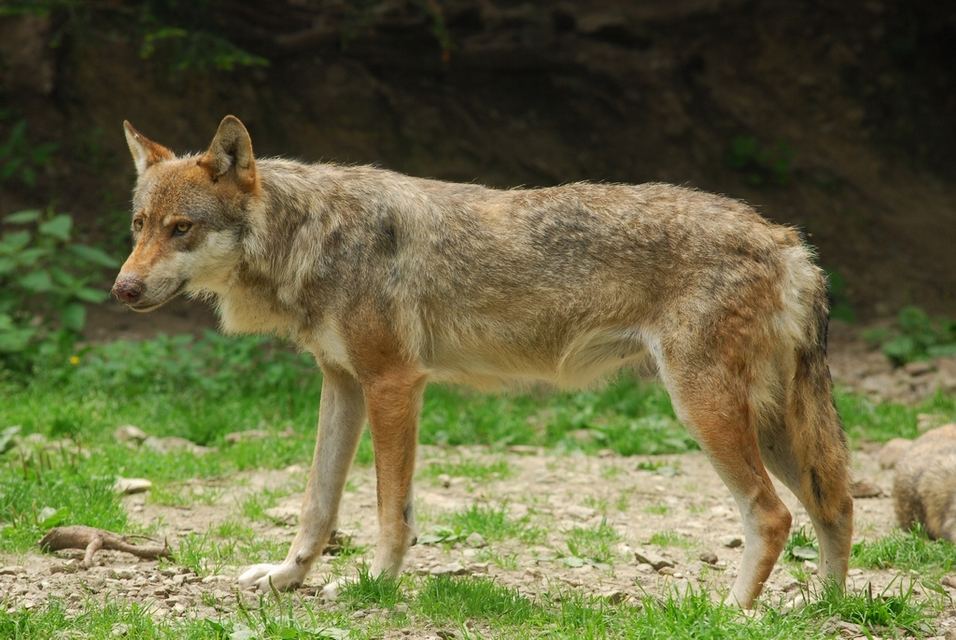
The Apennine wolf, a typical wildlife species of the mount.

The flora and fauna present are purely mountainous and reflect the representative species of the reserve and more broadly of the park and the Maiella massif itself. In the forests, transitory high forest trees or the result of young reforestation, coppice and barren areas alternate with specimens of medium age, such as those in the Coste del Fonnone forest, or centuries old, predominantly represented by beech, interspersed sporadically with species of Lobel's maple, sycamore maple, Italian maple, holly, hornbeam, European hop-hornbeam, turkey oak, chequer, European ash, manna ash, goat willow, and yew. Timber has been made from some of them in recent times. In the shrub pastures on the eastern slope, maythorn, blackthorn and dog rose are found as floral specimens. Other floral species include the Adriatic lizard orchid and the Marsican iris, which, despite its name, is endemic to this mountain. In addition, at low altitudes leek grows there spontaneously, which gives the mountain its name. Among the fungi, there are strangulated amanita, grisette amanita, clitocybe phyllophila, megacollybia platyphylla, cortinarius infractus, mutinus caninus, lacrymaria lacrymabunda, lactarius deterrimus, lactarius blennius, clavulina cinerea, clavariadelphus pistillaris, spathularia flavida, tricholoma basirubens and lycoperdon umbrinum, which grow in the undergrowth. The fauna present includes species that inhabit or frequent wooded areas, such as, in the case of large and small mammals, specimens of roe deer, red deer, wild boar, beech marten, European wildcat, European hare, Apennine wolf, pine marten, Marsican brown bear, red squirrel and red fox, and among birds, both raptor and non-prey, species of scops owl, northern goshawk, barn owl, little owl, long-eared owl, white-backed woodpecker, buzzard and sparrowhawk, some with daytime and others with nocturnal habits.

== History ==
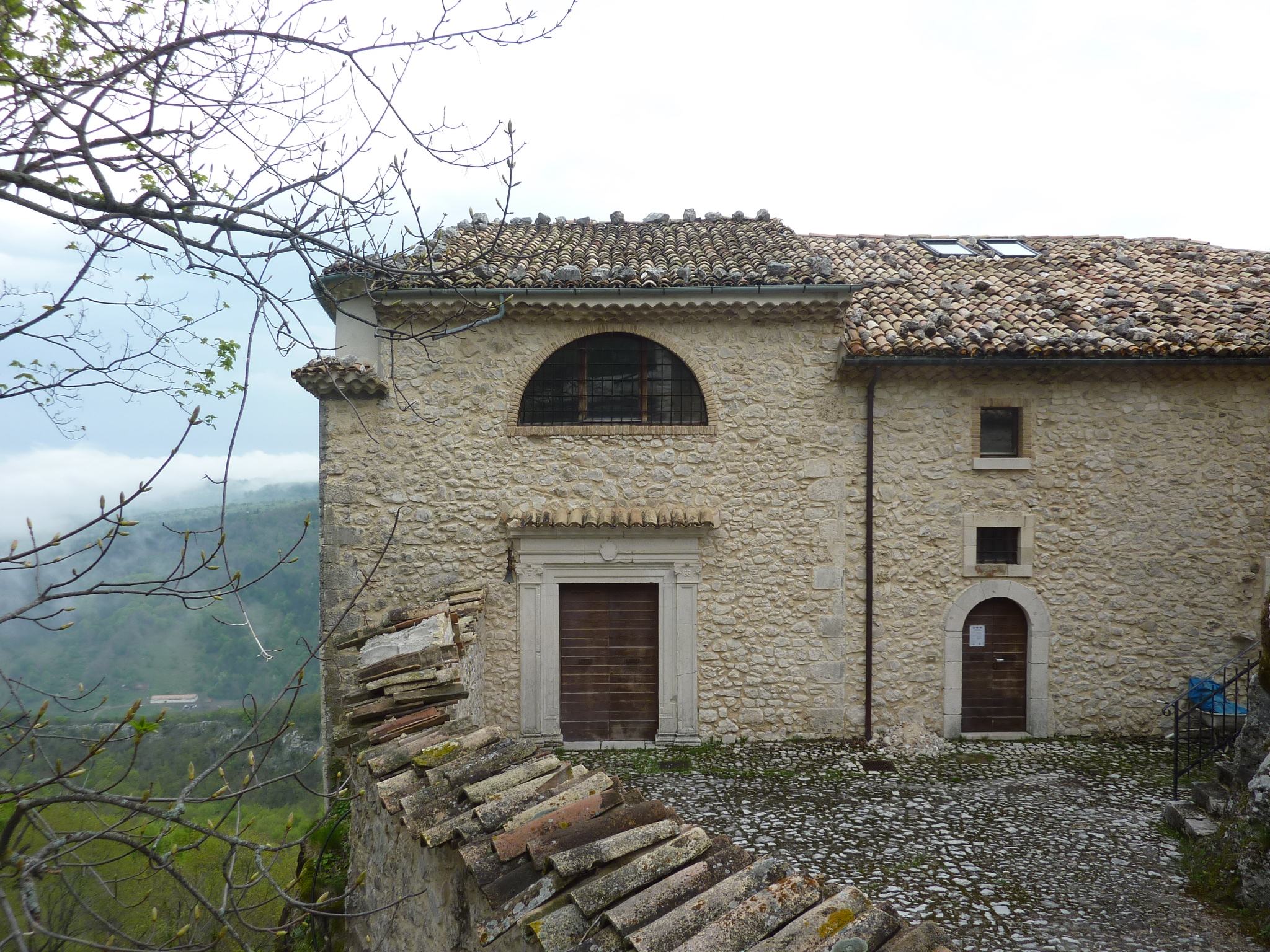
The hermitage of Madonna dell'Altare, located in the vicinity of the Taverna cave, where Pope Celestine V lived in the 13th century, at the time known as Pietro da Morrone

The mountain was referred to as "Palleno" in Roman times, from which the name of the municipality of Palena derives, with the meaning of "meadow on a steep slope." The name in use, with the literal meaning of "leek mountain," refers instead to the herbaceous plant of the same name that grows there wild at the low altitudes of the eastern slope. Mount Porrara hosted at different times three saints who came there in prayer: saint Falco, a hermit in the 11th century in a cave located between the mountain and the remaining Maiella massif, Pope Celestine V, at the time Pietro Angelerio and also known as Pietro da Morrone, a hermit in the 13th century in the Taverna cave, and saint Nicola da Forca Palena in the 14th century. In particular, Pietro da Morrone, who came from Castel di Sangro, dug his own dwelling himself, where he lived between 1235 and 1238, when he headed to Rome to receive the priestly habit. During the latter century, the Congregation of the Celestines built there the Hermitage of Madonna dell'Altare on a rock, located in the vicinity of the cave where their founder lived, dwelling there until 1807. In 1943, at the height of World War II, the Germans, given the strategic location of Mount Porrara and its proximity to the Gustav Line, built trenches there, of which the ruins remain, and converted the religious building into a prison. Throughout its history and to some extent to this day its heights were used for cattle grazing.

== Mountaineering routes ==
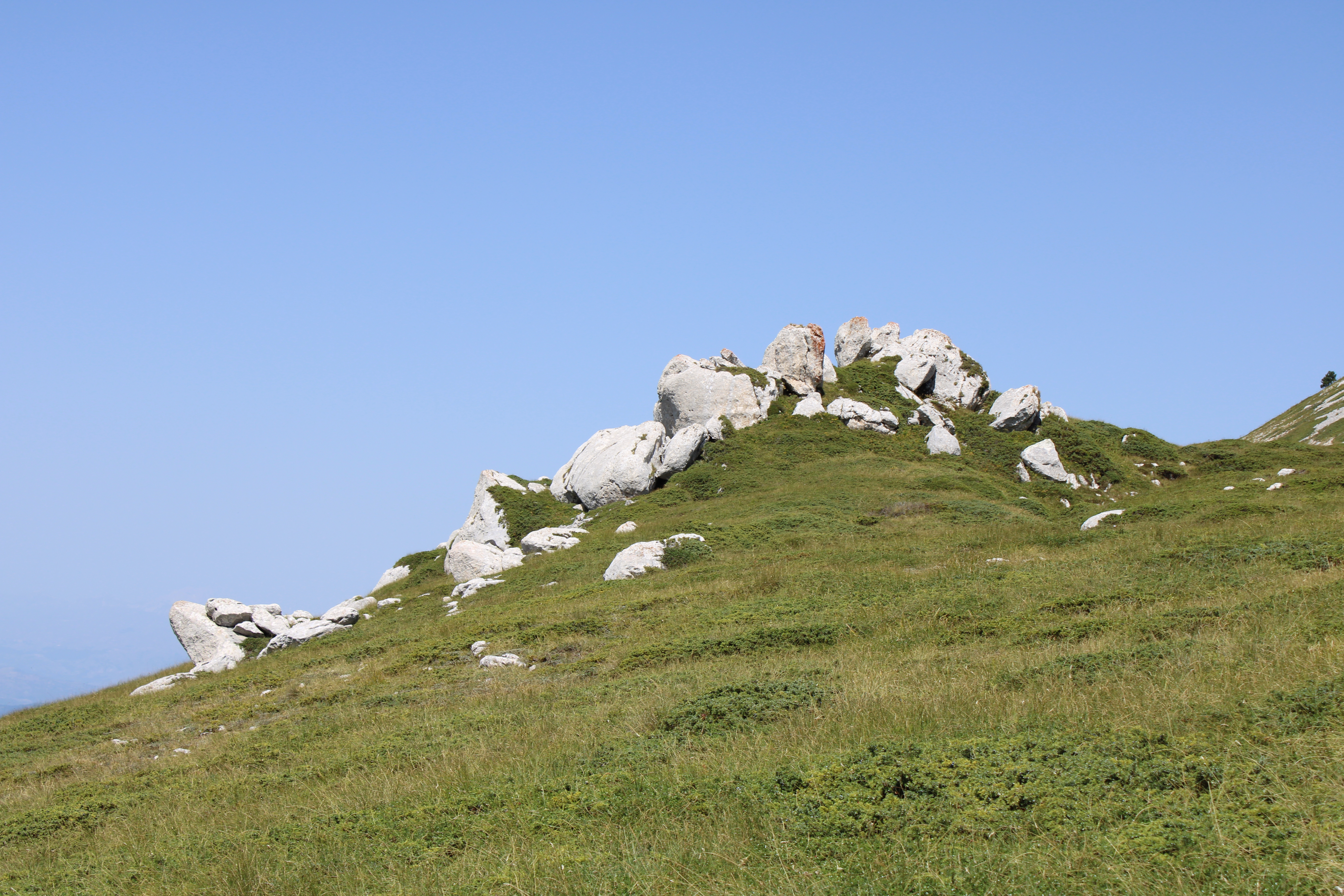
Pilate's lodges, the point of confluence of the various trails that cross Mount Porrara

The mountaineering routes that traverse Mount Porrara consist of a number of trails that, in hiking circles, make it possible to reach its summit: the normal route traces an itinerary that crosses its crest after passing the wooded areas and the summit pastures and is a hybrid between the park path and the CAI's Grand Italian Trail and is taken along the provincial road 12 Frentana, in the vicinity of the station of Palena, while the direttissima route is formed by a pair of parallel paths, in places overlapping and connected, which originate from the Hermitage of Madonna dell'Altare, present on an altar-shaped rock that gives it its name, located along the eastern slopes of the mountain, and, after passing through wooded areas and shrubby pastures, climb up to the Pilate's Lodges, natural terraces formed by stone boulders that bear the name of the character who characterized that place.

== See also ==
- Palena, Abruzzo
- Maiella
- Maiella National Park

== Bibliography ==
- "Madonna dell'Altare". Eremi d'Abruzzo. Guida ai luoghi di culto rupestri. Pescara: Carsa Edizioni. 2000.
- Ernesto Giammarco (1990). Toponomastica abruzzese e molisana. Vol. 6 del Dizionario abruzzese e molisano. Roma: Edizioni dell'Ateneo.
- Antonio Grano (2001). Il Papa santo: Celestino V. San Pietro a Maiella: vita e miracoli dell'eremita abruzzese che a Napoli si dimise da pontefice ma non fece per viltade il gran rifiuto. prefazione di Mimmo Liguoro. Napoli: Tullio Pironti.
- Parco nazionale della Maiella (2020). Carta escursionistica. Scala 1:25.000. Pistoia: DREAm Italia.
- Massimo Pellegrini; Dario Febbo, eds. (1998). Abruzzo: guida ai parchi e riserve naturali. Abruzzo, Natura Forte del Mediterraneo. Pescara: Carsa Edizioni.
- Antonio Sciarretta (1997). Toponomastica della Maiella orientale. Ortona: Menabò.
- Maria Rosaria Tieri; Nino Tieri (2009). Funghi d'Abruzzo. Bellante: Paper's World.
