= Sant'Eufemia a Maiella =

- Comune
- Comune di Sant'Eufemia a Maiella
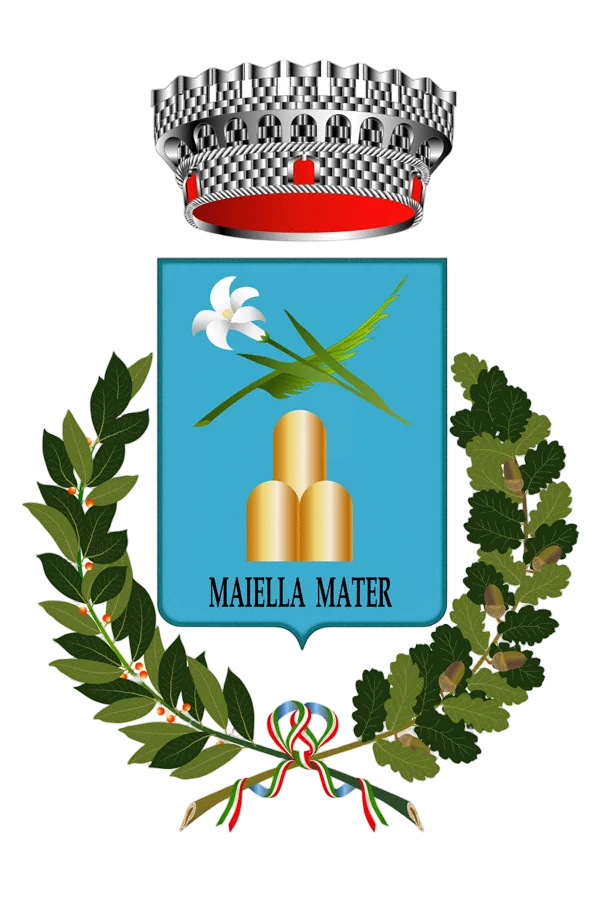
- Coat of arms

- Location within Italy Location within Abruzzo
- Coordinates: 42°07′32″N 14°01′36″E
- Country: Italy
- Region: Abruzzo
- Province: Pescara (PE)
- Frazioni: Roccacaramanico, San Giacomo

Government
  - Mayor: Francesco Crivelli (since 2021)

Area
  - Total: 40 km^{2} (15 sq mi)
- Elevation: 878 m (2,881 ft)

Population (2024)
  - Total: 250
  - Density: 6.2/km^{2} (16/sq mi)
- Demonym: Santeufemiesi
- Time zone: UTC+1 (CET)
  - Summer (DST): UTC+2 (CEST)
- Postal code: 65020
- Dialing code: 082
- Website: www.comune.santeufemiaamaiella.pe.it

Sant'Eufemia a Maiella is a town and comune in the province of Pescara, Abruzzo, central Italy. It is located in the Maiella National Park in a valley enclosed by the western slopes of the Majella massif, and the northeastern slopes of the Morrone group.

== History ==
Originally the town of Sant'Eufemia was known as Santa Femi. In the 14th century the town was renamed Santa Fumia and retained that name until 1863 when, by decree of King Victor Emmanuel II, it was named Sant'Eufemia a Maiella.

Until the 11th century Sant'Eufemia a Maiella was part of the Caramanico Terme. Then, in 1064, Count Berardo gave the church of Sant'Eufemia and surrounding land at Caramanico to the Abbey of San Clemente a Casauria which retained possession of the town until 1145. In 1145, the area became the possession of Boemondo, who was the Count of Manoppello at the time. Eventually, in 1301 ownership was passed on to the Ughelli family and then to Giacomo Arcucci, the Count of Minervino. Upon the death of Giacomo Arcucci in 1389, it became the property of the D'Aquino family.

== Main sights ==
- Giardino Botanico Daniela Brescia

== Climate ==
Climate data for Sant'Eufemia a Maiella, elevation 810 m (2,660 ft), (1951–2000)
Month	Jan	Feb	Mar	Apr	May	Jun	Jul	Aug	Sep	Oct	Nov	Dec	Year
Record high °C (°F)	18.0 (64.4)	21.9 (71.4)	24.2 (75.6)	26.0 (78.8)	31.0 (87.8)	36.0 (96.8)	35.6 (96.1)	36.0 (96.8)	32.2 (90.0)	29.0 (84.2)	24.0 (75.2)	19.8 (67.6)	36.0 (96.8)
Mean daily maximum °C (°F)	6.1 (43.0)	7.1 (44.8)	9.6 (49.3)	13.0 (55.4)	17.9 (64.2)	22.1 (71.8)	25.1 (77.2)	25.2 (77.4)	20.7 (69.3)	15.2 (59.4)	10.6 (51.1)	7.2 (45.0)	15.0 (59.0)
Daily mean °C (°F)	2.8 (37.0)	3.4 (38.1)	5.6 (42.1)	8.9 (48.0)	13.2 (55.8)	16.9 (62.4)	19.4 (66.9)	19.5 (67.1)	15.9 (60.6)	11.2 (52.2)	7.2 (45.0)	4.0 (39.2)	10.7 (51.2)
Mean daily minimum °C (°F)	−0.6 (30.9)	−0.3 (31.5)	1.6 (34.9)	4.7 (40.5)	8.5 (47.3)	11.7 (53.1)	13.7 (56.7)	13.9 (57.0)	11.1 (52.0)	7.2 (45.0)	3.6 (38.5)	0.8 (33.4)	6.3 (43.4)
Record low °C (°F)	−15.0 (5.0)	−13.8 (7.2)	−13.1 (8.4)	−9.1 (15.6)	−4.6 (23.7)	3.0 (37.4)	4.1 (39.4)	1.9 (35.4)	0.0 (32.0)	−6.0 (21.2)	−10.2 (13.6)	−13.5 (7.7)	−15.0 (5.0)
Average precipitation mm (inches)	142.7 (5.62)	133.2 (5.24)	137.2 (5.40)	133.3 (5.25)	93.5 (3.68)	82.4 (3.24)	62.7 (2.47)	71.0 (2.80)	115.1 (4.53)	146.8 (5.78)	188.0 (7.40)	182.6 (7.19)	1,488.5 (58.6)
Average precipitation days	10.3	10.6	11.0	11.1	9.8	8.2	5.3	6.2	7.9	9.7	12.1	12.1	114.3
Source: Regione Abruzzo
