= Palena =

Palena may refer to:

== Places ==
In Chile:

- Palena Province

- Palena, Chile

- Palena River

In Italy:

- Palena, Abruzzo, the namesake of the Chilean town and province

== People ==
- Claudia M. Palena, Argentine-American immunologist and cancer researcher
- Nicola da Forca Palena (1349-1449), Italian Roman Catholic priest
