= Giardino Botanico Daniela Brescia =

Botanical garden in Italy

Coordinates: 42°7′N 14°1′E

The Giardino Botanico Daniela Brescia (43,000 m^{2}) is a botanical garden located in the Majella National Park (Parco Nazionale della Majella) at an altitude of 900 meters above sea level, in Sant'Eufemia a Maiella, Abruzzo, Italy. It is open daily during the summer, and weekends otherwise.

The garden was established in 2000, and now contains almost 500 species including Achillea oxyloba, Cerastium tomentosum, Cymbalaria pallida, Genziana dinarica, and other species typical of Mount Majella. It contains reproductions of several environments in the central Apennine Mountains, including high altitude cliffs and screes, along with the Majella National Park Herbarium.

== See also ==
- List of botanical gardens in Italy
