= Blockhaus =

Blockhaus may refer to:

- blockhouse, a small, isolated fort in the form of a single building to serve as a defensive strong point
- casemate, a fortified gun emplacement or armored structure from which guns are fired
- A peak of the Maiella massif in the Central Apennines in Italy
