= Monte Amaro =

Mountain in Abruzzo, Italy

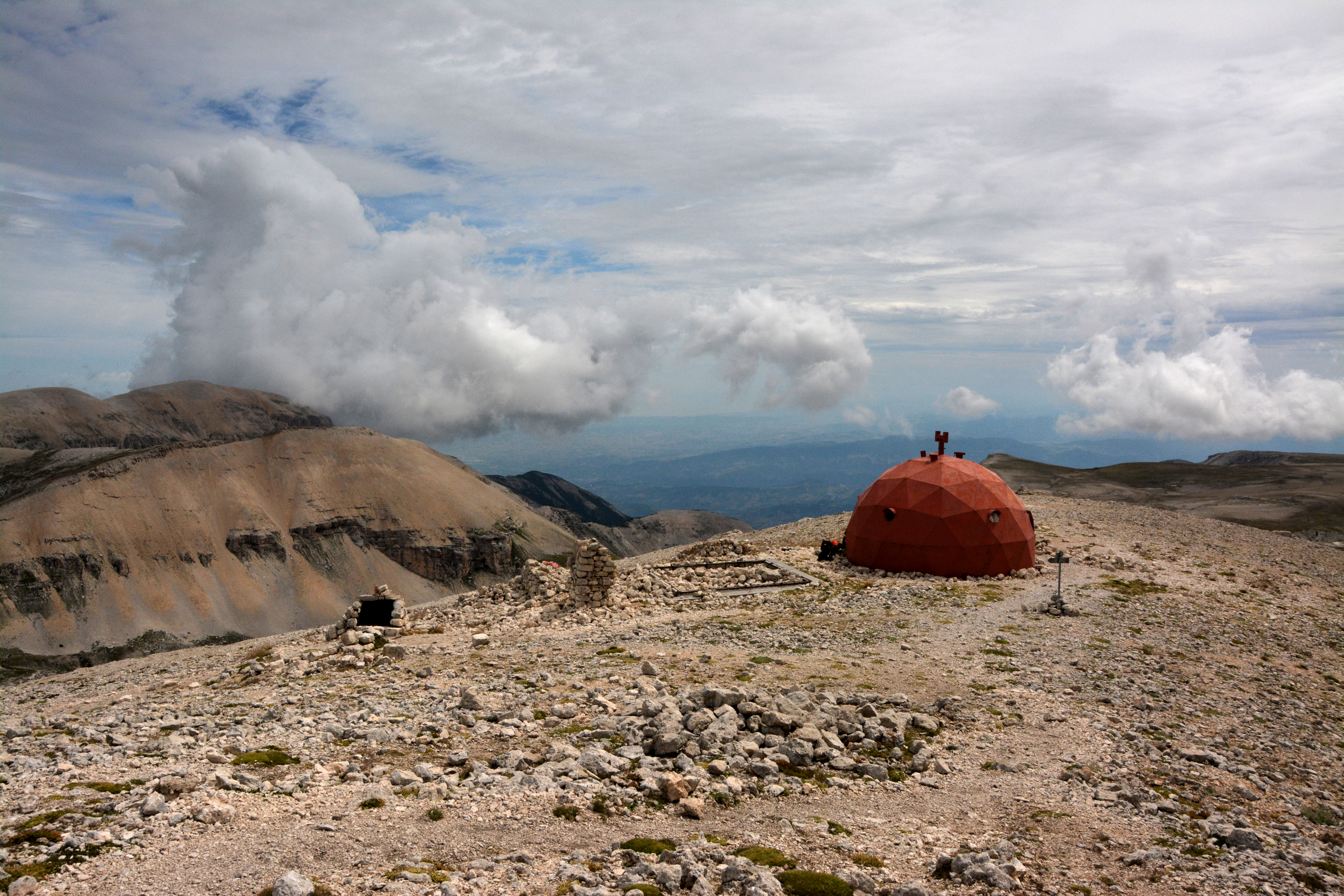
- Summit of Mount Amaro, highest peak of Maiella, with the red bivouac Cesare Mario Pelino

Highest point
- Elevation: 2,793 m (9,163 ft)
- Prominence: 1,810 m (5,940 ft)
- Isolation: 60.18 km (37.39 mi)
- Listing: Mountains of Italy; Ultra, Ribu
- Coordinates: 42°05′11″N 14°05′09″E

Geography
- Location within Italy
- Country: Italy
- Region: Abruzzo
- Province: L'Aquila
- Parent range: Apennines (Maiella)

Mount Amaro (2793 m a.s.l.) is the highest mountain peak in the Maiella massif and the second highest in the Abruzzo region and the entire continental Apennines, after Gran Sasso's Corno Grande.

== Description ==
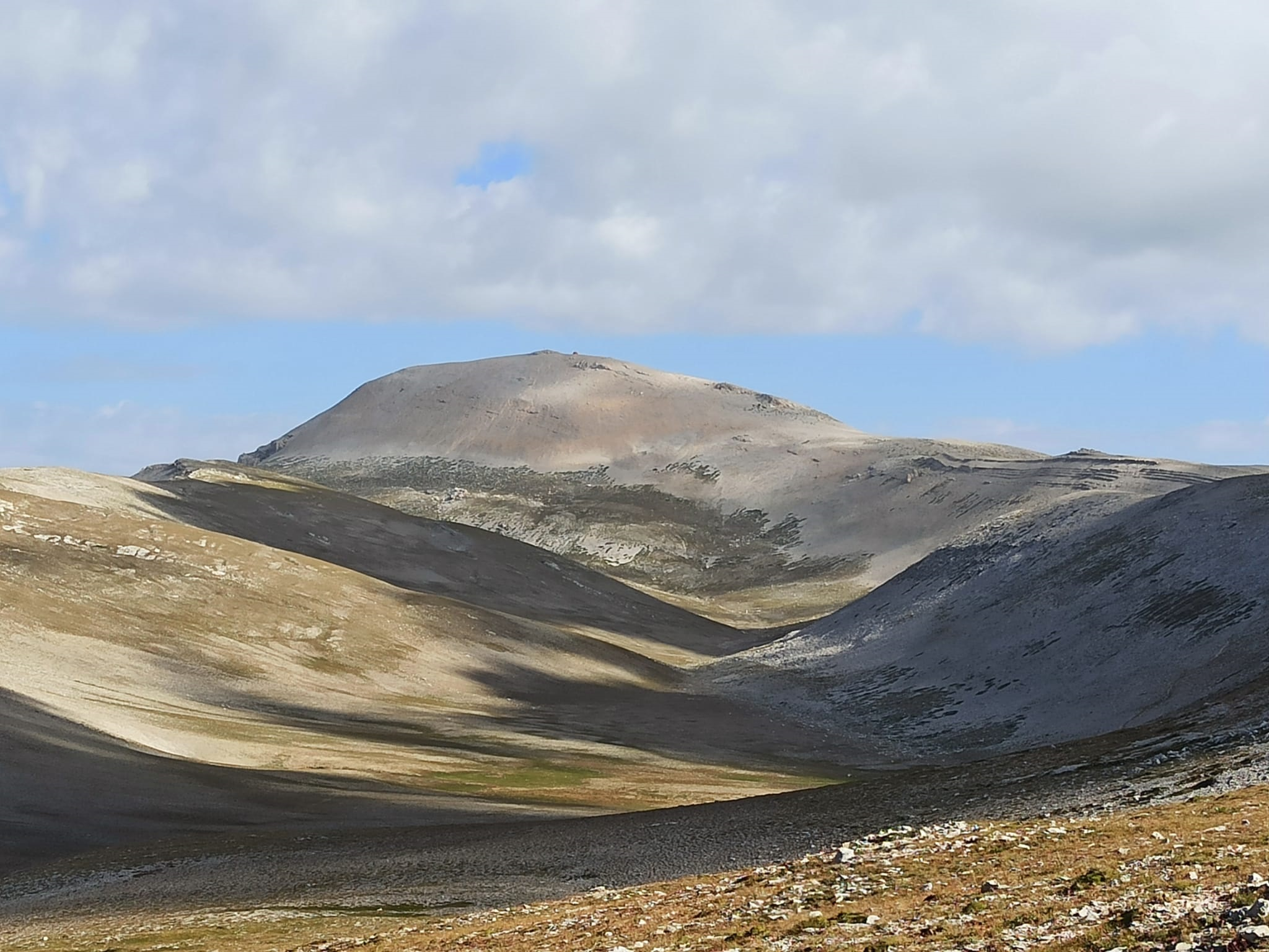
Mount Amaro as seen from the valley of Femmina Morta

The mountain occupies a central position within the Maiella massif, surrounded to the north by Mount Pesco Falcone, to the northeast by Mount Tre Portoni, to the east by the Altare peak, and to the south by Mount Macellaro, to which it is separated by the Femmina Morta valley. More precisely, it is located on the western slope of the massif, which descends steeply toward Pacentro and San Leonardo Pass. The eastern slope, on the other hand, overlooks the various scattered mountains to the northwest, including Mount Acquaviva, separated by valleys and deep gorges, and the valleys of Fara San Martino and Taranta Peligna to the east and southeast, respectively. On the summit is the Cesare Mario Pelino bivouac, shaped like an igloo, painted red and containing the summit book, with the Ciro Manzini refuge below on the north side.

== History ==
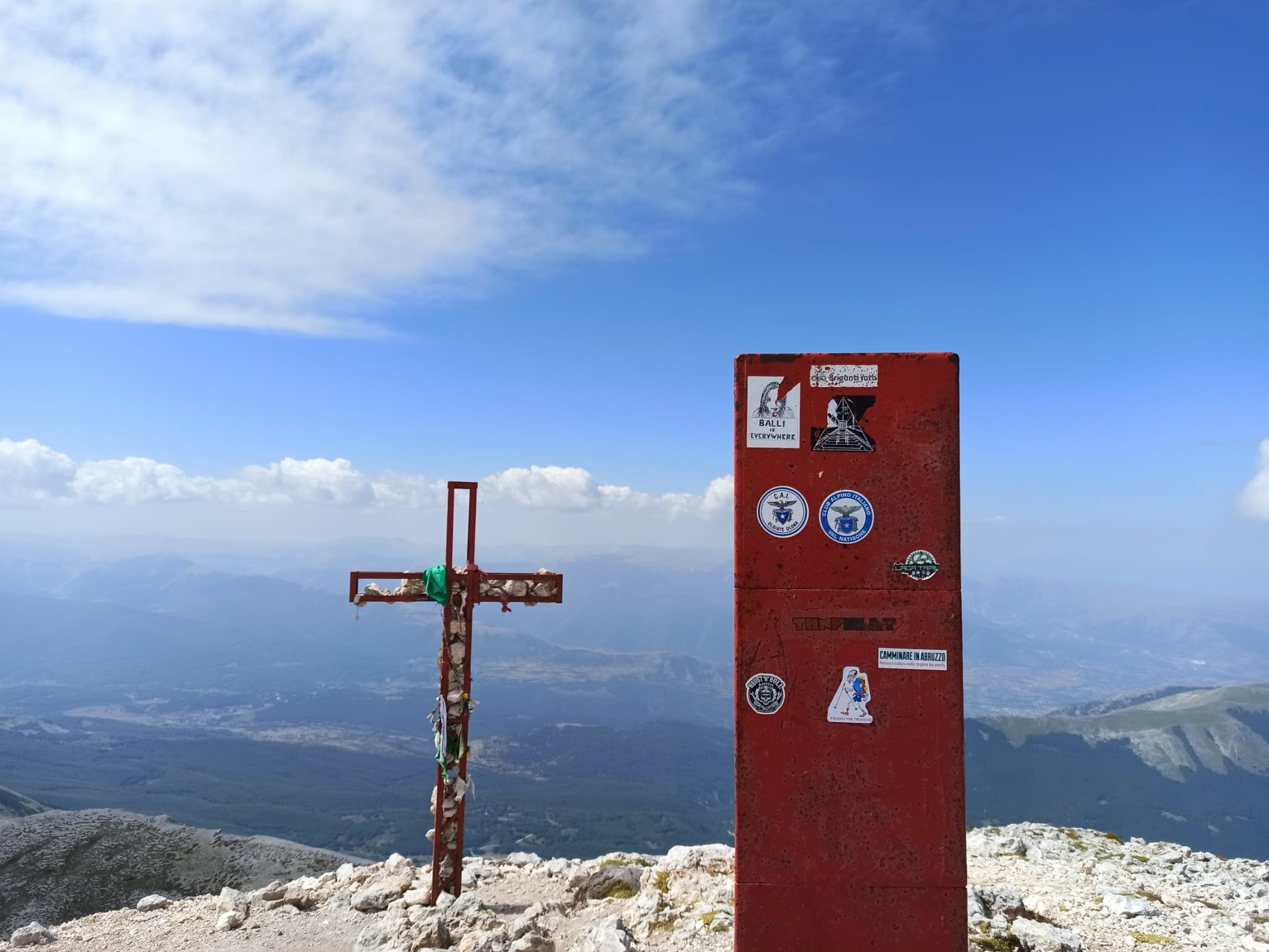
Cross placed on the highest point of Mt. Amaro

Mount Amaro was originally called "Mons Malus", with the Latin meaning of "Bad Mount", as documented in a 13th-century bull issued by Pope Honorius III, which, as the language changed over time, was altered to the name in use, which, like the previous name, refers to the ruggedness that characterizes its summit.

In the 11th century, excavations were carried out in the depths of the mount to extract marble and stones that were used in the construction of the columns found in a chapel of the hermitage of Santo Spirito a Majella.

The peak of Mount Amaro, listed in the cadastre of the Kingdom of the Two Sicilies as "productive pasture or fallow land" and privately owned by Giuseppe Andrea Angeloni, was acquired in 1890 by donation from the CAI of Rome to build in the same year the Vittorio Emanuele II refuge, dedicated to the King of Italy of the House of Savoy, later sold in 1937 to the CAI of Chieti.

In the spring of 1944, during World War II, the peak, like others in the Maiella massif, was occupied by the Germans, intent on thwarting the moves of the Allies, who equipped the area with anti-aircraft guns and the construction there of an observatory and a cable car that allowed them to reach the peak from Campo di Giove. The funicular was noticed by the partisans of the Maiella Brigade, who initiated actions to spoil the cable car and had British Spitfires bomb the Germans positioned on the summit, leading to the destruction of the Vittorio Emanuele II shelter. The funicular, already heavily damaged by the partisans, would be finally demolished by the Germans themselves on 7 June 1944, as the outcome of the war worsened.

In 1964 the Ciro Manzini refuge was built on the upper part of the Cinnamon Valley, but still on Mount Amaro, named after the Farese mountaineer who in 1937 was the first to reach the summit of the Murelle and who perished on 23 December 1940, while fighting on the Greek-Albanian front during World War II, being awarded the silver medal of military valor. Also in the same year and until 1966 the Sulmona CAI carried out in parallel the construction work, on the part of the land that was the Vittorio Emanuele II refuge, of the Falco Maiorano bivouac, named after the club's mountain guide of the same name. However, the new construction was short-lived: it was completely swept away by a severe blizzard in 1974.

In 1981, with a completely different project from the previous ones, the CAI of Sulmona, assisted by the Frosinone aviators, began construction work on the Cesare Mario Pelino bivouac, which would end the following year, with the new structure then being inaugurated on 18 July 1982 and named after one of the members of a well-known Sulmona confectionery.

== Mountaineering routes ==
Mountaineering routes to reach the summit include the so-called "direttissime" routes that ascend from Pacentro, at Passo San Leonardo, and from Sant'Eufemia a Maiella ("rava del ferro", "rava della giumenta bianca" and "rava della vespa"), as well as some hybrid Maiella National Park trails with the CAI's Grand Italian Trail, some of them via Blockhaus or Campo di Giove. The direct routes bear the name "rava", a term for a landslide gully made of stony debris that descends between two slopes.

== See also ==
- Maiella
- Pacentro
- Fara San Martino
- Taranta Peligna

== Bibliography ==
- Dizionario corografico-universale dell'Italia. Vol. 4, 1ª parte. Milano: Giuseppe Civelli & Co. 1852.
- Alberico Alesi; Maurizio Calibani (2007). Majella Parco Nazionale. Folignano: Società Editrice Ricerche.
- Istituto Poligrafico e Zecca dello Stato (3 January 1949). Gazzetta Ufficiale della Repubblica Italiana. Vol. 1ª parte, anno 90º. Roma: Istituto Poligrafico e Zecca dello Stato.
- Parco nazionale della Maiella (2020). Carta escursionistica. Scala 1:25.000. Pistoia: DREAm Italia.
