= Palena, Abruzzo =

Town in Italy

Palena
- Comune
- Comune di Palena
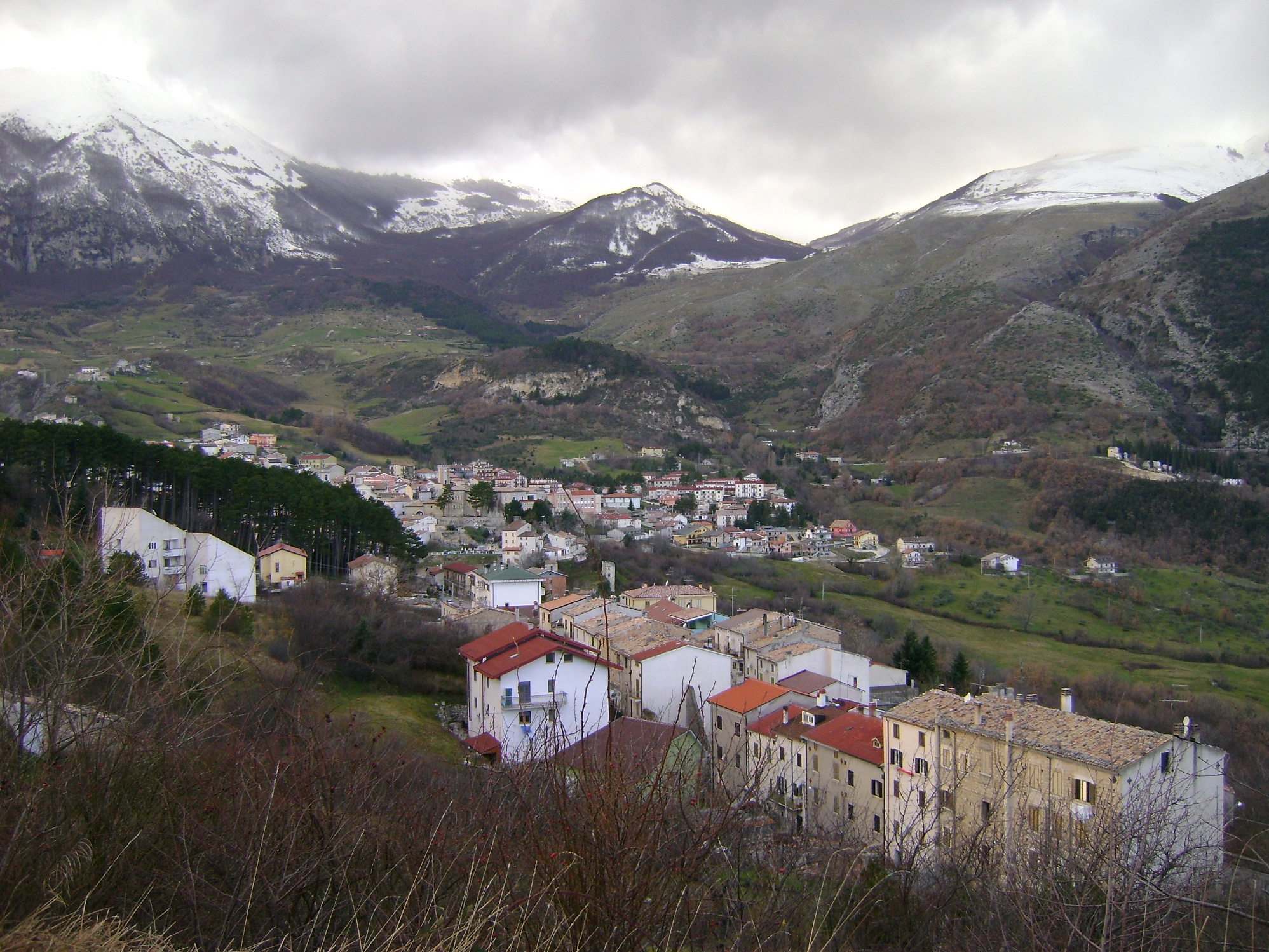
- View of Palena

- Location within Italy Location within Abruzzo
- Coordinates: 41°58′54″N 14°8′3″E
- Country: Italy
- Region: Abruzzo
- Province: Province of Chieti (CH)
- Frazioni: Aia dei Cordoni, Palena stazione

Area
  - Total: 91 km^{2} (35 sq mi)
- Elevation: 767 m (2,516 ft)

Population (2004)
  - Total: 1,504
  - Density: 17/km^{2} (43/sq mi)
- Demonym: Palenesi
- Time zone: UTC+1 (CET)
  - Summer (DST): UTC+2 (CEST)
- Postal code: 66017
- Dialing code: 0872
- Patron saint: San Falco

Palena is a comune and town in the province of Chieti in the Abruzzo region of Italy.

It is the hometown of Pietro Como and Lucia Travaglini, the parents of Italian-American baritone Perry Como (1912–2001). There is a plaque commemorating Perry Como as well as the home of painter Oreste Recchione, who also lived in Palena.

It is one of I Borghi più belli d'Italia ("The most beautiful villages of Italy"). The town lies within the border of Maiella National Park.

== History ==
=== Origins ===
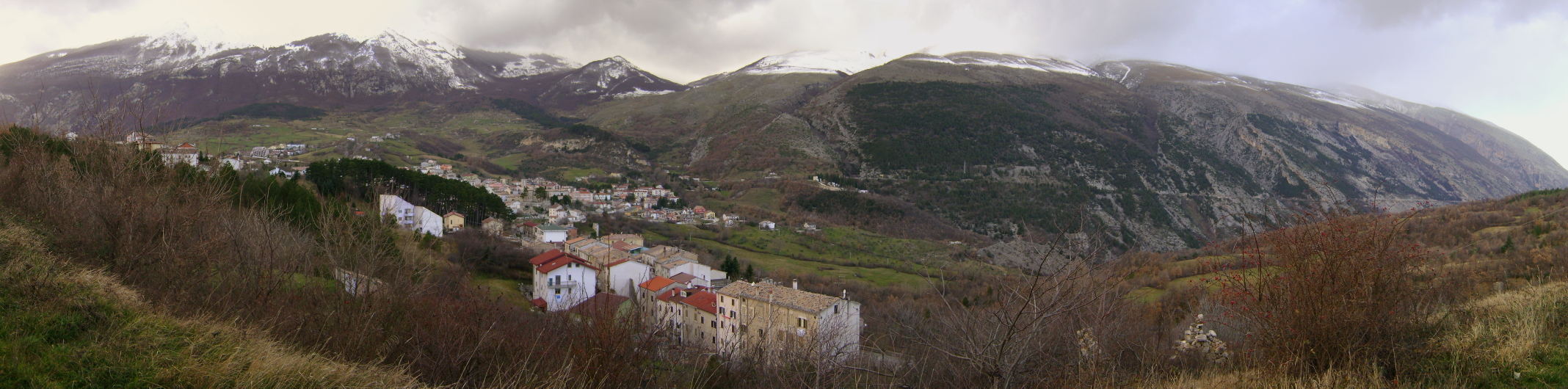
View of the upper part of Palena da Monte Porrara

Fossils have been found in the capo di Fiume, now on display in the municipal paleontological museum where it shows what the environment of the Maiella was like 7 million years ago. The municipal territory of Palena has already been inhabited since the time Paleolithic, as proof of this, some artifacts from this period have been found in the Palena area. Later, in the period italico and Roman era, some districts of Palena, are inhabited as evidenced by some tombs and buildings of the time. The municipal capital dates back to early Middle Ages when the town is a fief of Gualtieri, Orsini, Antonio Caldora, Matteo di Capua and D'Aquino. Various Benedictine monks have inhabited the area.

=== Early Middle Ages and the Lombards ===
The colonization of the Lombards took place in the 9th century. They venerated the cult of St. Michael the Archangel and St. George, as they will found a chapel at the mountain cave of the same name of Sant'Angelo. The territory was part of the Diocese of Sulmona-Valva, at the extreme border with the diocese of Chieti. The territory in the 11th century was divided into various villas, i.e. groups of pastoral houses: Castello Alberico (the current center), Pizzo Superiore e Inferiore, Castelcieco, Forca di Palena, San Cristinziano and Sant'Egidio. All these districts already in the 15th century no longer existed due to earthquakes.

In 930, the monk Giovanni da San Vincenzo al Volturno wrote in the Chronicon Vulturnense of the presence of the church of Santa Maria de Palena, together with a plot of land for the work of the population. At the same time in Palena he settled San Falco, where he died there and was soon venerated as a patron saint of the obsessives and the accidious.

=== Late Middle Ages and the development of churches ===
Monasticism in Palena arose in the 12th century as evidenced by the bull of Pope Innocent II citing the church of San Vito in Furca, one of the oldest. This, together with the one dedicated to San Falco, just above the river, were under the jurisdiction of the diocese of Valva (Corfinio). The churches then existing were of Sant'Antonio Abate, Santa Croce, San Cristinziano, San Cataldo, San Tommaso and San Giovanni.

A special mention deserves the lost church of San Cristinziano (also known as San Cristiano or San Costantino): in 1065 the Counts of Sangro Borrello di Borrello and his son Borrello Infante donate it to Bishop Teatino Attone, then Lord of Chieti.

Also in the 11th century, the Ducal Castle, by the Normans, on the highest point of the spur above the river, was founded. Meanwhile, a local barony developed: Count Beamondo is mentioned in a bull of 1130 in which he restored the small hermit church of San Nicola di Coccia. In the Catalogus Baronum Palena is mentioned as a large fortified village on the border with the Territory of Sulmonese and Chieti, strategically located towards the Fork Pass, which held the power of the small rural centers of Lettopalena, Gessopalena, Montenerodomo, Lama dei Peligni and Taranta Peligna. Together with the Manors of Pacentro, the lords fortified the streets with watchtowers, hence the first example of the medieval castle of Pacentro.

=== Hermitage of Pietro da Morrone ===
In 1235, Friar Pietro da Morrone, a.k.a. Celestine V, went to hermitage on the Majella, at a cave on the Fork pass, on the border between Palena and Field of Jupiter. He had already been in the romitorio of St. Onofrio at Sulmona. A few years later on site, at the behest of Charles of Angiò a hermitage was built divided into a fortified building to house pilgrims, and a smaller one as a place of worship.

=== Modern era and early 1900s ===
A testimony of 1587 tells of the feast of the Palii San Falco, feast of January 13 to honor the patron, in which the faithful made a race on the pebbles of the mountain barefoot.

In 1706, the center was damaged by the Majella earthquake with severe damage. In fact, the church of San Falco was demolished and rebuilt to accommodate more pilgrims. In 1915, Palena was connected by the line of the Sangritana Railway, with toll booth in an elevated position above the village, compared to the normal lower level station, for reasons of practicality. The toll booth connected it to Castel di Sangro. In 1933 a new earthquake damaged Palena and neighboring municipalities, forcing the podestà to tear down the castle's control towers, which were dangerous.

=== The Second World War and current events ===
In November 1943, the country was joined by the Nazis, being along the path of the Gustav line. It was used as a prison camp, and was later bombed by the Allies. The symbol of the destruction was the church of San Falco, razed to the ground completely, except for the bell tower. The partisans of the "Maiella Brigade also contributed to the re-esasing of the Germans.

In the years of reconstruction, the church of San Falco was completed in 1953, in a modern-ancient key, and the center developed considerably further downstream, near Villa Sant'Antonio. Also in the 1950s a controversy arose about the demolition of the civic tower in front of the church of San Falco, considered dangerous. After the felling, a new turret was built at the castle. In the 1970s, to facilitate access, the so-called "Tagliata di Palena" was built, that is, the provincial road that runs along the Majella, coming from Lama.

In 1992, the municipality was included in the Majella National Park

=== Religious architecture ===
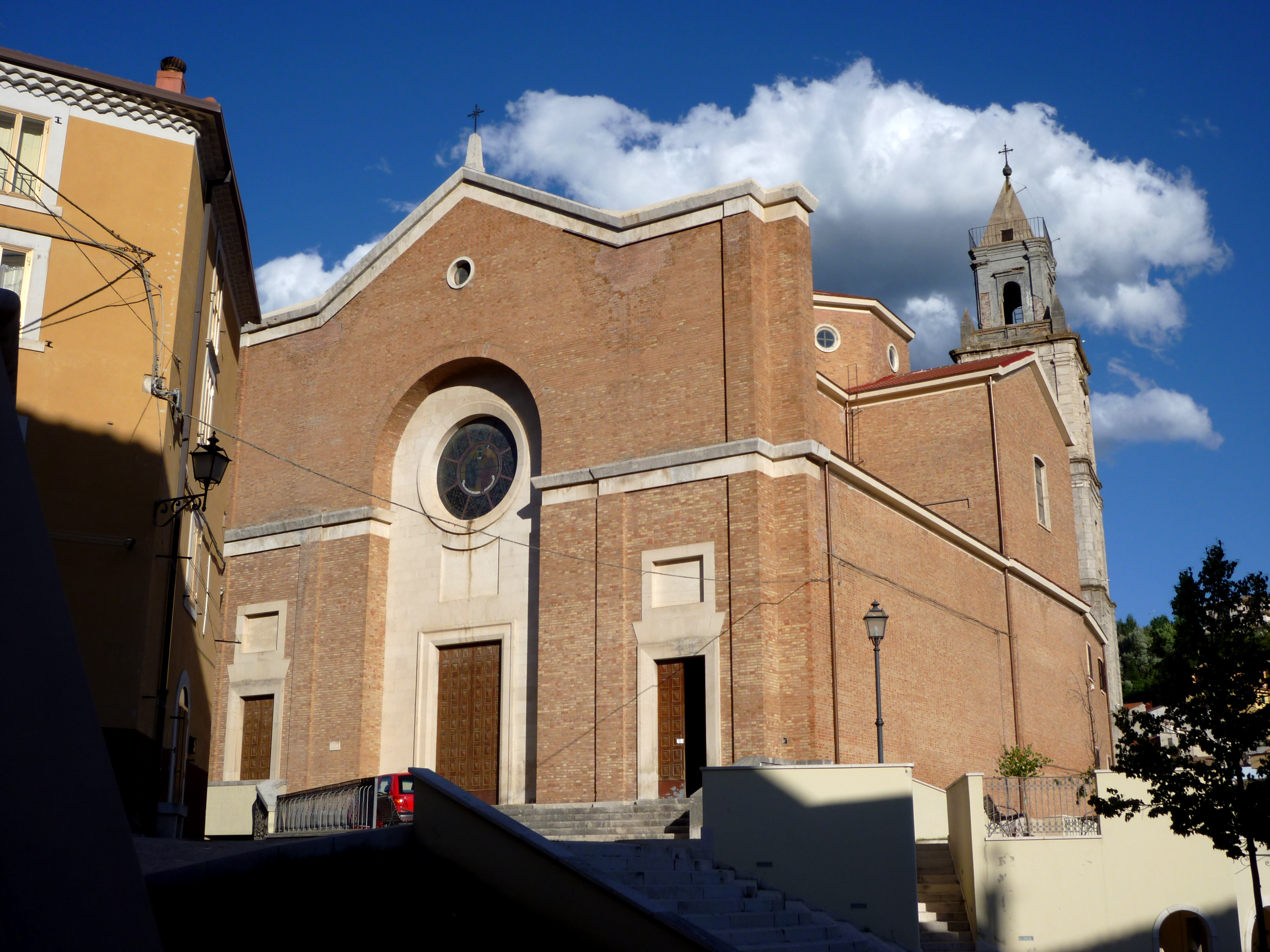
the Church of San Falco.

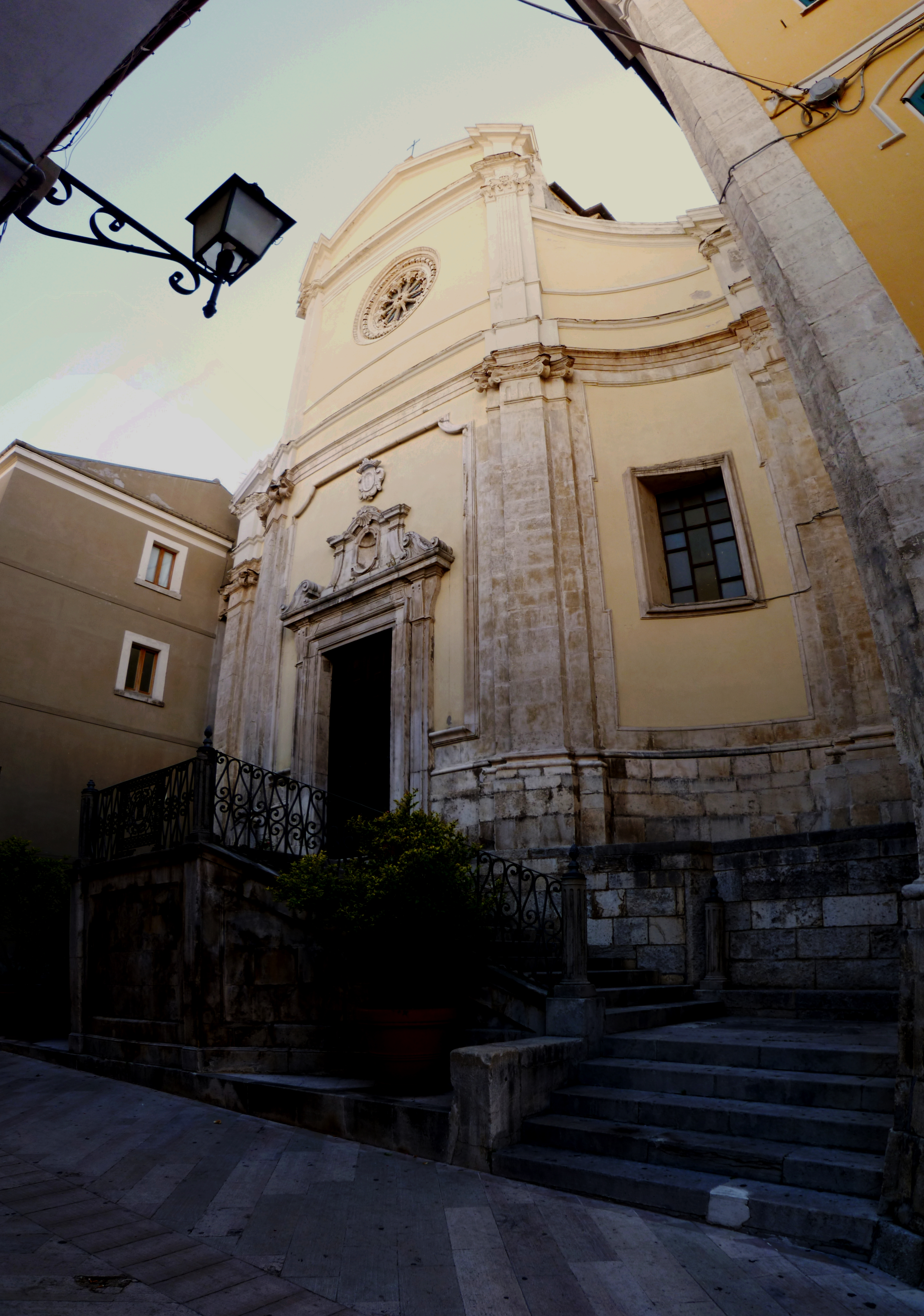
The Church of Madonna del Rosario.

- Church of San Falco and Sant'Antonino. Parish church of the town, was built in the 12th century, after the earthquake of 1706, it was built again, while maintaining the bell tower of the fourteenth century. In World War II it was heavily bombed and the whole building, minus the bell tower, jumped into the air. It was reopened in 1953, with the new body built, following the forms of the late Baroque style. It has a basilica plan with transept, in red brick, with a façade punctuated by a rose window. Above the transept is a small octagonal dome. The stone bell tower of the Maiella, is a sturdy tower marked in three levels, with a final cusp above the lantern. The church preserves the relics of Falco di Palena, the patron saint.
- Hermitage of Our Lady of the Altar It is located to the left of State road 84 between the Valico della Forchetta and the Monte Porrara, to the left of the Aventine It was founded by monks celestines near a rocky buttress where Pietro da Morrone lived in a cave for about four years. Since 1970 the complex has been the property of the municipality.
- Church of San Cataldo. It is located in San Cataldo along State Road 84. It was built in the 11th century but was reworked after World War II due to the serious damage it suffered. The façade is in the typical structure of Abruzzo religious architecture. On the sides of the portal there are two classic devotionis windows typical of churches rural. On the sides of the church there are three windows on each side. The block added on the back acted as sacristy. The interior, at a single nave has an altar made of stucco and a statue of plaster located on the bottom. Another statue, depicting St. Catald, was taken to another place after the church was closed to worship. However, the church is a destination for the saint's festivities.

=== Civil and military architecture ===
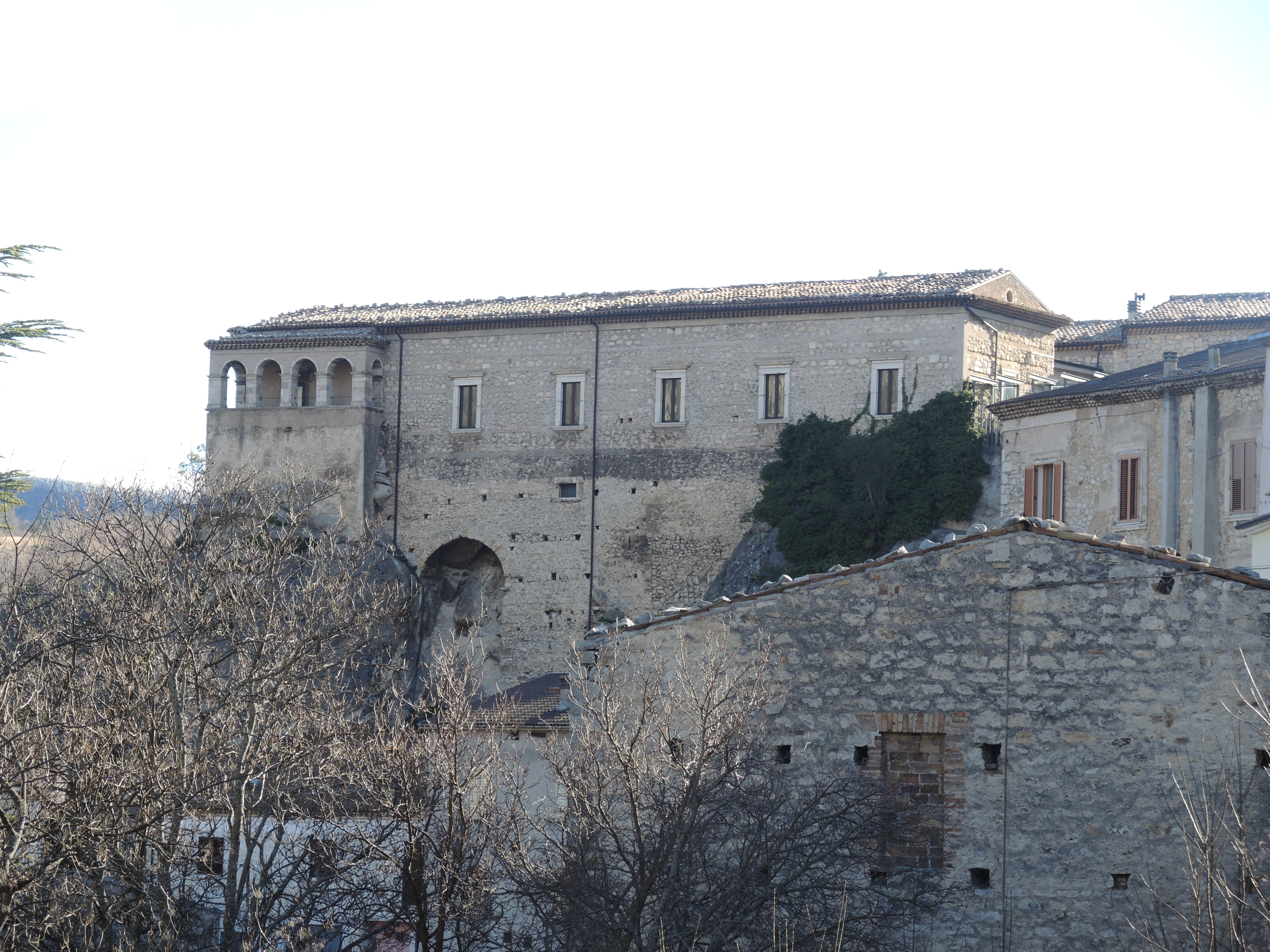
Il castello ducale

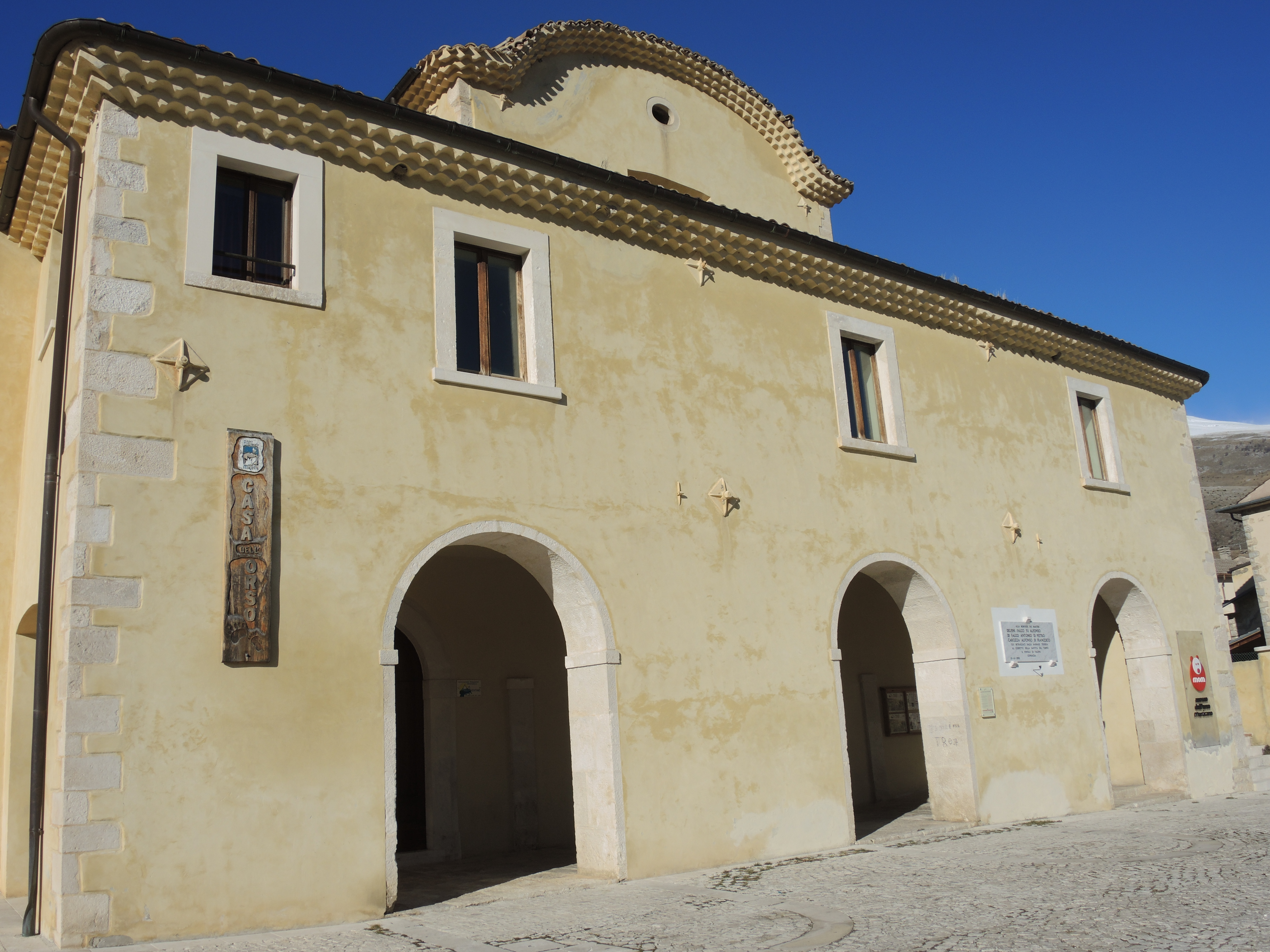
Ex convento di Sant'Antonio, oggi sede del Museo dell'orso marsicano

- Ducal Castle. The castle is located on a rocky outcrop, in the highest part of the historic center of Palena. The original building dates back to the 12th century, but, probably, in the following centuries it was repeatedly reworked due to the violent earthquakes that followed in the town and neighboring areas, one of these tremors occurred in 1933 which brought various damage to the building, including the destruction of the towers, the male and the belvedere. The castle, as we see it today, is due to the reconstruction, due to the destruction of the Second World War, implemented in the fifties when the lookout is redone at one of the corners. There is currently an attempt to re-functionalize its interior. The various buildings of the castle are covered with double-pitched roofs made with a mantle of tiles and romanelle frames on three rows of overlapping tiles. The system is rectangular resulting from the union of the various buildings. The windows, which are also rectangular, are arranged on two levels. A loggia with four arches is located on one of the longest sides, while on the opposite side there is a series of four arches. The entrance to the castle is possible through an urbica door that has a single fornice to round arch . On the opposite side is a portal lintel with frame molded and geometric designs.
- Castelletta. It is located in Piana del Casone. Initially born as masseria of support of pastoralism at a tratturo. It is now used for private housing purposes. The construction of the building dates back to 17th century above a pre-existing building that popular legends want a temple dedicated to Jupiter or Hercules. In the 20th century with the decline of pastoralism the building was adapted to residence with adaptations to the oidic purpose. The building consists of two levels. Two circular turrets rise on two corners. Some windows have arisen, perhaps, as a result of transformations for housing purposes. The façade is austere and devoid of decoration. The canopy is framed with romanelle consisting of three rows of tiles staggered with each other. The appearance is Romanesque-rural. It is a fortified farmhouse isolated from the town.
- Houses with porches. These are townhouses located in Piazza del Municipio. The original buildings, perhaps, are medieval. Today's appearance is the result of changes and changes over time. On the ground floor there are shops, on the upper floors, on the other hand, there are private houses. The arcades have round arches and pointed. Often, above the arcades, there are two floors with a mezzanine with windows, for the greater ovals, in addition there are cornice marcapiano or between the ground floor and the upper floors or between the upper floors and the mezzanine.
- Clock tower: the original tower was obtained from a medieval bastion in the 1800s, and equipped with a public clock, with an access arch that allowed entry to the ascent of the castle. The original tower remains intact in the damage of World War II. Sensationally in 1953, during the restoration works of the mother church, the municipal admiration decided to tear down the turret to rebuild it at the castle, on the belvedere, partly following the ancient style. Of the original tower today only the round arch of entrance remains, at the churchyard. The new tower has square plan is made of mountain stone, has a public clock, and a simple blacke decoration.

== Climate ==
Climate data for Palena, elevation 767 m (2,516 ft), (1951–2000)
Month	Jan	Feb	Mar	Apr	May	Jun	Jul	Aug	Sep	Oct	Nov	Dec	Year
Record high °C (°F)	21.3 (70.3)	21.0 (69.8)	26.0 (78.8)	26.9 (80.4)	30.2 (86.4)	39.0 (102.2)	39.0 (102.2)	38.7 (101.7)	34.7 (94.5)	29.1 (84.4)	24.9 (76.8)	21.7 (71.1)	39.0 (102.2)
Mean daily maximum °C (°F)	7.5 (45.5)	8.3 (46.9)	10.8 (51.4)	14.6 (58.3)	19.0 (66.2)	23.3 (73.9)	26.5 (79.7)	26.4 (79.5)	22.3 (72.1)	16.9 (62.4)	12.0 (53.6)	8.5 (47.3)	16.3 (61.4)
Daily mean °C (°F)	4.0 (39.2)	4.6 (40.3)	6.8 (44.2)	10.0 (50.0)	14.3 (57.7)	18.2 (64.8)	21.0 (69.8)	21.0 (69.8)	17.5 (63.5)	12.8 (55.0)	8.4 (47.1)	5.2 (41.4)	12.0 (53.6)
Mean daily minimum °C (°F)	0.6 (33.1)	0.9 (33.6)	2.9 (37.2)	5.7 (42.3)	9.6 (49.3)	13.1 (55.6)	15.5 (59.9)	15.6 (60.1)	12.8 (55.0)	8.8 (47.8)	4.9 (40.8)	1.9 (35.4)	7.7 (45.8)
Record low °C (°F)	−14.0 (6.8)	−10.8 (12.6)	−11.0 (12.2)	−5.3 (22.5)	−1.0 (30.2)	3.6 (38.5)	6.7 (44.1)	6.0 (42.8)	1.8 (35.2)	−1.0 (30.2)	−6.0 (21.2)	−12.0 (10.4)	−14.0 (6.8)
Average precipitation mm (inches)	91.0 (3.58)	83.5 (3.29)	88.7 (3.49)	87.7 (3.45)	66.0 (2.60)	58.2 (2.29)	49.5 (1.95)	50.0 (1.97)	70.8 (2.79)	94.2 (3.71)	122.9 (4.84)	116.6 (4.59)	979.1 (38.55)
Average precipitation days	9.7	9.8	10.5	10.1	9.7	7.6	5.7	5.3	7.5	9.5	11.1	11.5	108
Source: Regione Abruzzo

== See also ==
- Hermitage of Madonna dell'Altare
- Monte Porrara
