= Hermitage of San Giovanni all'Orfento =

Hermitage in Camarinco Terme, Italy

Coordinates: 42.1539°N 14.0807°E

- Eremo di San Giovanni all'Orfento
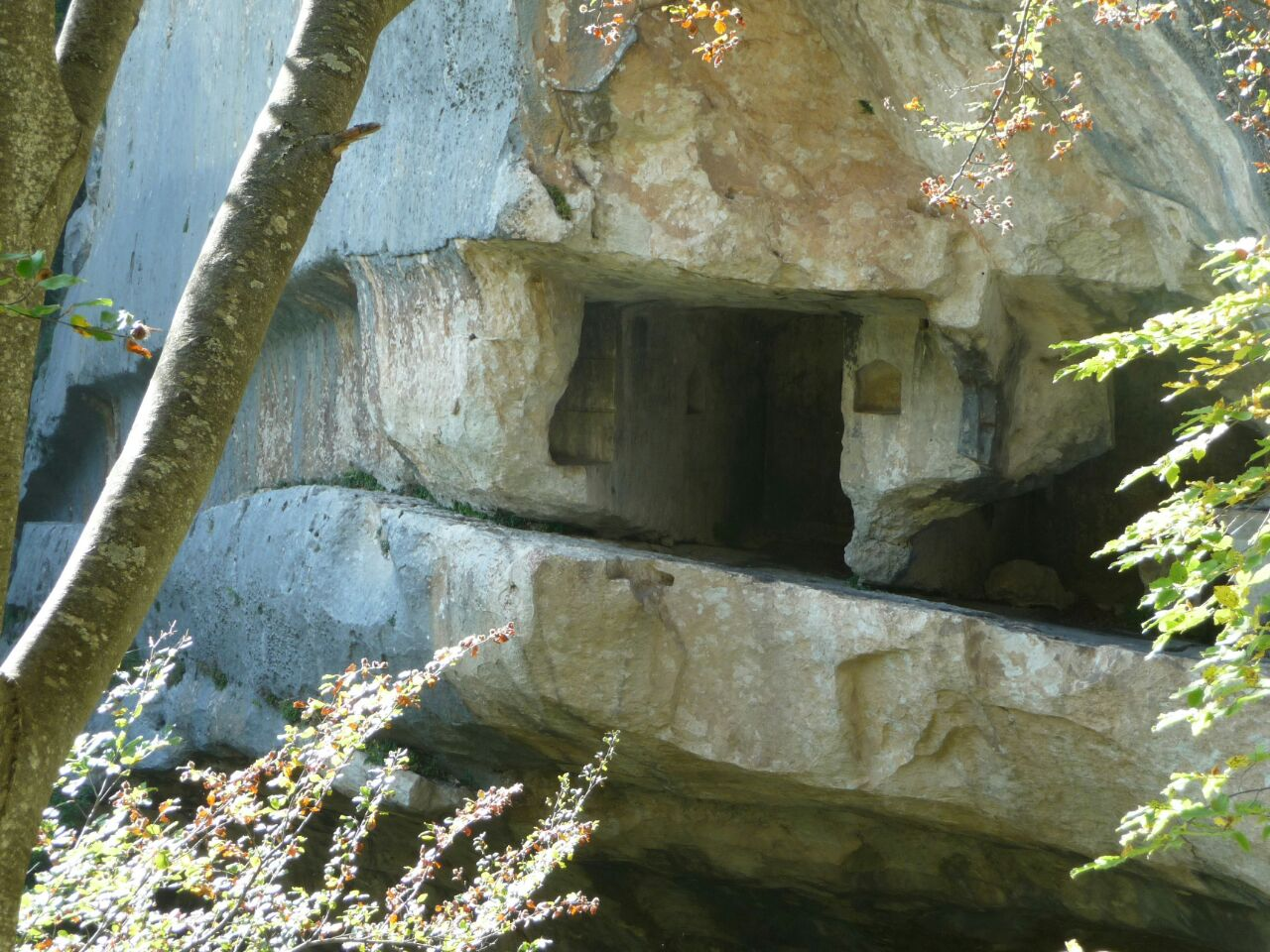
- View of the hermitage

- Location within Abruzzo

Religion
- Affiliation: Roman Catholic
- Province: Province of Pescara
- Region: Abruzzo

Location
- Municipality: Caramanico Terme
- State: Italy
- Interactive map of Hermitage of San Giovanni all'Orfento

Architecture
- Completed: 11th-century

Eremo di San Giovanni all'Orfento (Italian for Hermitage of Giovanni all'Orfento) is an hermitage located in Caramanico Terme, Province of Pescara (Abruzzo, Italy).

== History ==
The religious building, belonging to the municipality of Caramanico Terme and located within the Valle dell'Orfento Nature Reserve, which is part of the Maiella National Park, lies along the Orfento river and above the Hermitage of Sant'Onofrio all'Orfento, at an elevation of 1227m. It was inhabited by Pietro da Morrone, the future Pope Celestine V, and his disciples between 1284 and 1293 and later by his followers. Dedicated to Saint John and carved above the eponymous cave, it is the most difficult-to-access Celestinian hermitage in the Maiella National Park. Excavations carried out in 1995 uncovered artifacts from the Bronze Age and revealed the original structure of the place of worship.

== Architecture ==
The original structure of the place of worship included, in addition to the hermitic part that has been preserved inside the cave, also the underlying part dedicated to cenobitic life, which has been destroyed. This included the monks' cells, a guesthouse for pilgrims, and a small church. The cave, formerly accessible through a narrow passage in the rock as well as via a wooden walkway, consists of two areas: a rectangular room (2 x 3.8m) with a flat ceiling and three niches in the walls, two in the left wall and one in the back wall. This room is followed by another room with a barrel vault, an altar, and small spaces with niches in the walls used as storage. The hermitage has a functioning water system carved into the rock to collect rainwater and runoff from the rock walls, channeling it into settling tanks that end in a cistern; there is also a wooden channel for the same purpose.
