= Cortinarius infractiflavus =

Scientific classification
- Kingdom: Fungi
- Division: Basidiomycota
- Class: Agaricomycetes
- Order: Agaricales
- Family: Cortinariaceae
- Genus: Cortinarius
- Species: C. infractiflavus

Binomial name
- Cortinarius infractiflavus (M.M.Moser) Kytöv., Niskanen, Liimat., Bojantchev & Ammirati (2014)

Synonyms
- Cortinarius infractus var. flavus M.M.Moser (1999)

Species of mushroom-forming fungus

Cortinarius infractiflavus is a species of mushroom-forming fungus in the family Cortinariaceae. It was described as a new species in 1999 from collections made in Wyoming, USA. The mushroom is known to occur North American north of Mexico, Finland, and Bulgaria, where it grows on the ground in boreal and mountainous conifer forests.

== Taxonomy ==
It was originally described as new to science in 1999 by Meinhard Moser, who initially proposed it as a variety of Cortinarius infractus, under the name Cortinarius infractus var. flavus. The holotype specimen (IB 97/169) was collected near Brooks Lake Lodge in Shoshone National Forest, Wyoming, on 12 August 1997. The taxon was raised to species status in 2014 when molecular analysis showed it to be genetically distinct from C. infractus. The specific epithet infractiflavus refers to its relationship to C. infractus and its yellow cap.

== Description ==
Cortinarius infractiflavus bears a convex, somewhat sticky and hygrophanous pileus measuring 20–80 mm in diameter, its margin initially inrolled. The cap surface is glutinous when moist and changes appearance as it dries, ranging in colour from yellow-brown to nearly yellow with an olivaceous-grey marginal zone. The lamellae are distinctively paler than those of typical C. infractus, adopting an olivaceous-brown hue.

The stipe measures 25–70 mm in length and 10–16 mm in thickness, swelling to a bulb 12–20 mm wide at the base. Young specimens display a yellowish cortina that later weathers to greyish-brown with an olivaceous cast and fine fibrils. Remnants of the veil are whitish. The flesh (context) is pale olive-buff to tilleul buff, with marbled greyish tones in the stipe, and emits a very faint cedar-wood or fungoid odour. The taste is only mildly bitter, markedly less so than that of C. infractus.

Microscopically, basidiospores measure 6.7–8.5 × 5.4–6.1 μm (mean 7.6 × 5.4 μm), varying from drop-shaped to nearly spherical or lightly almond-shaped, with a length-to-width ratio of 1.25–1.6 (mean 1.4). The basidia are clavate, four-spored and measure 30–32 × 7.5–8 μm. The gill trama comprises hyphae 5–7 (–8) μm wide—colourless to pale yellowish-grey—with the central layer containing hyphae up to 12 μm wide. The pileipellis is formed by a dense layer of hyphae 5.5–8 μm wide, with pale yellow walls and clamp connections.

Chemical spot tests on the flesh and gill surfaces are negative with potassium hydroxide (KOH) solution and ammonium hydroxide (NH_{4}OH), turn dingy brown with ferrous sulphate and blackish with silver nitrate. Under ultraviolet light, the cap fluoresces dingy red with pale yellow patches, the stipe shows a dingy red reaction, and the flesh exhibits a blue fluorescence.

== Habitat and distribution ==
Cortinarius infractiflavus has a much wider distribution than initially recognized, occurring across Northern Hemisphere boreal and mountainous regions. While first documented in the Greater Yellowstone ecosystem of Wyoming (USA), where it appears to be the common form of the C. infractus complex, molecular studies have confirmed its presence across North America and Eurasia. The species typically grows in coniferous forests dominated by spruce (Picea species) and fir (Abies species).

In North America, it has been documented in subalpine forests with Engelmann spruce (Picea engelmannii) and subalpine fir (Abies lasiocarpa) in Wyoming, as well as in British Columbia, Canada. In Europe, the fungus has been found in diverse forest habitats. Collections include specimens from Finland's boreal forests, where it was found in a mixed forest of Scots pine (Pinus sylvestris), Norway spruce (Picea abies), juniper (Juniperus), birch (Betula), poplar (Populus), and alder (Alnus) on dolomite substrate. It has also been documented at elevations of 1600 metres in Bulgaria's Pirin mountains under Norway spruce. This transcontinental distribution pattern, confirmed through DNA sequencing, demonstrates that C. infractiflavus is a widespread species throughout the northern coniferous forest biome rather than a localized variant.

== See also ==
- List of Cortinarius species
