= Caramanico Terme =

- Comune
- Comune di Caramanico Terme
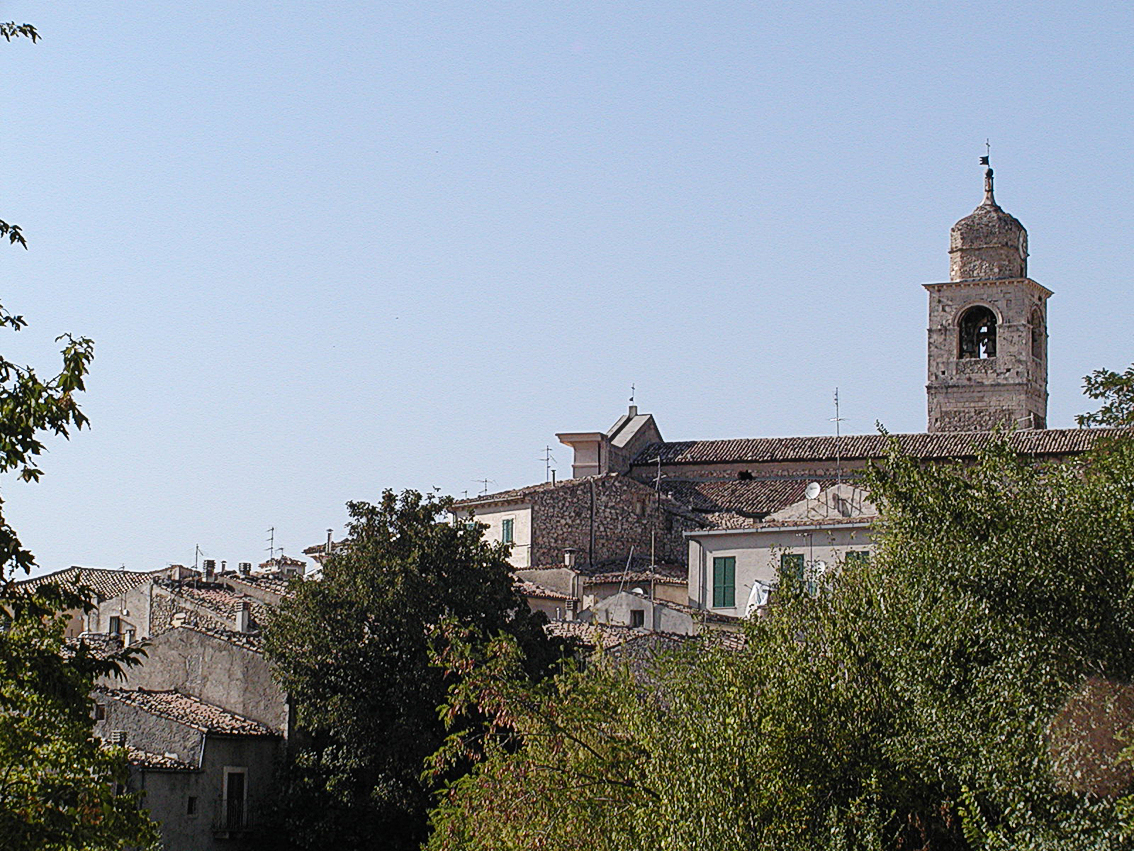
- View of Caramanico Terme

- Coat of arms

- Location within Italy Location within Abruzzo
- Coordinates: 42°09′N 14°0′E
- Country: Italy
- Region: Abruzzo
- Province: Pescara (PE)
- Frazioni: De Contra, San Nicolao, San Tommaso, San Vittorino, Santa Croce, Sant'Elia, Scagnano

Government
  - Mayor: Franco Parone (Rinascita)

Area
  - Total: 84.55 km^{2} (32.64 sq mi)
- Elevation: 650 m (2,130 ft)

Population (2010)
  - Total: 2,030
  - Density: 24.0/km^{2} (62.2/sq mi)
- Demonym: Caramanichesi
- Time zone: UTC+1 (CET)
  - Summer (DST): UTC+2 (CEST)
- Postal code: 65023
- Dialing code: 085
- Website: Official website

Caramanico Terme is a comune and town in the province of Pescara, located in the Abruzzo region of Italy. Nestled on a hilltop, it lies near the confluence of the Orfento and Orta rivers, between the Monte Morrone and Majella mountains. It is one of I Borghi più belli d'Italia ("The most beautiful villages of Italy").

== History ==
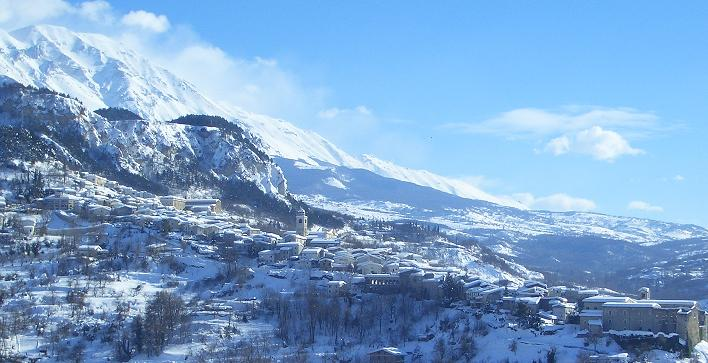
View of Caramanico Terme in winter

The town takes its name from cara, meaning rock and/or arimannia, a Lombard establishment in the late Middle Ages. Then the name Terme was added in 1960 because of the presence of a spa nearby.

The present settlement is recorded since Lombard times. Then it underwent a remarkable development in the 14th-15th centuries, under the D'Aquino family, and in that period many important monuments were built. In 1706, an earthquake nearby destroyed the town.

== Main sights ==
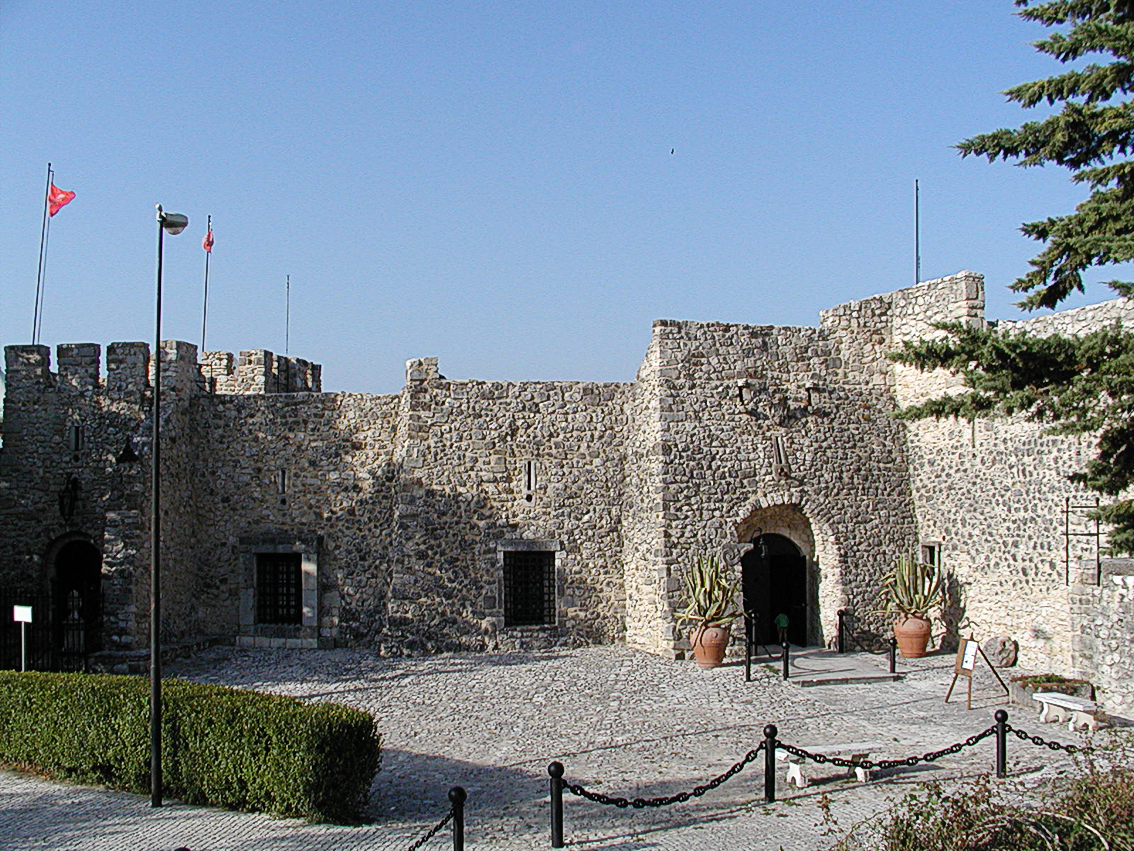
the Salle castle

- Church of S. Maria Maggiore (15th century), with a Gothic exterior and an ogival portal with a depiction of the Coronation of the Virgin (1476). The exterior has also depictions of apostles, pilgrims and singers with 15th century musical instruments. The Assumption Chapel (17th century) has a Baroque interior.
- Romanesque church of St. Tommaso, founded in the 13th century in honor of Thomas of Canterbury. It was built above a 9th-century pieve. It has a nave and two aisles, with different levels. The façade has a rose window and single mullioned windows, three portals and four semi-colons from a never built portico. The side portals have with floreal decorations, while the central one has a high-relief of the Twelve Apostles and Christ Enthroned (1118). The interior, with a nave and aisles divided by composite columns (right) and square columns (left). The interior houses also a Corinthian column (known as Colonna santa) which has alleged miraculous properties.
- Archaeological Museum "P. Barrasso"
- Museum of Abruzzo and Italy Fauna
- Hermitage of San Giovanni all'Orfento
