= Foro (river) =

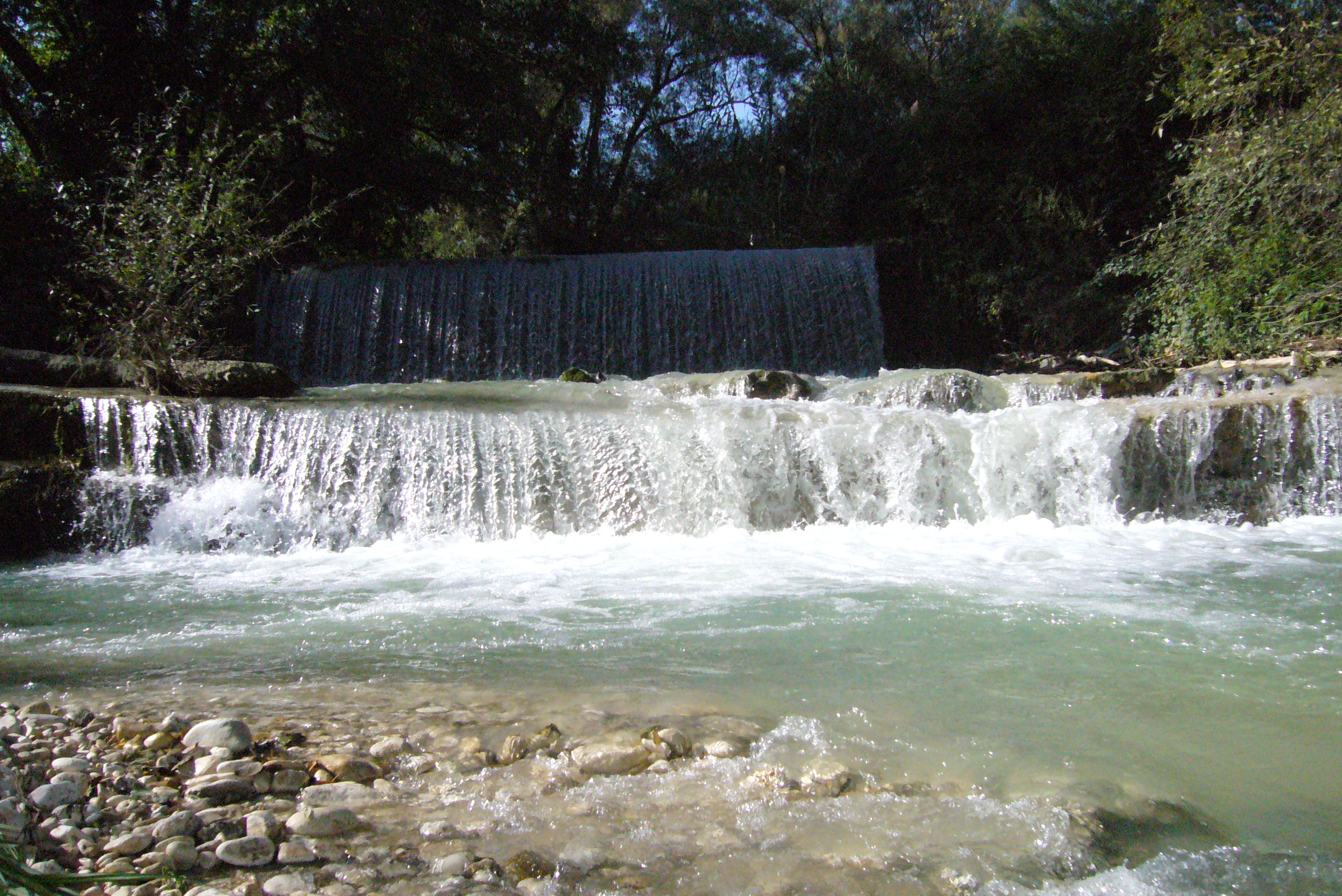

Location
- Country: Italy

Physical characteristics
- Mouth: Adriatic Sea
  - coordinates: 42.4011°N 14.3275°E

The Foro is a river in Italy. It is located in the province of Chieti in the Abruzzo region of southern Italy. Its source is located in Maiella National Park near the border with the province of Pescara. The river flows northeast past Fara Filiorum Petri before flowing into the Adriatic Sea between Francavilla al Mare and Ortona.
