= Hermitage of Madonna dell'Altare =

Coordinates: 41.9456°N 14.1200°E

- Eremo della Madonna dell'Altare
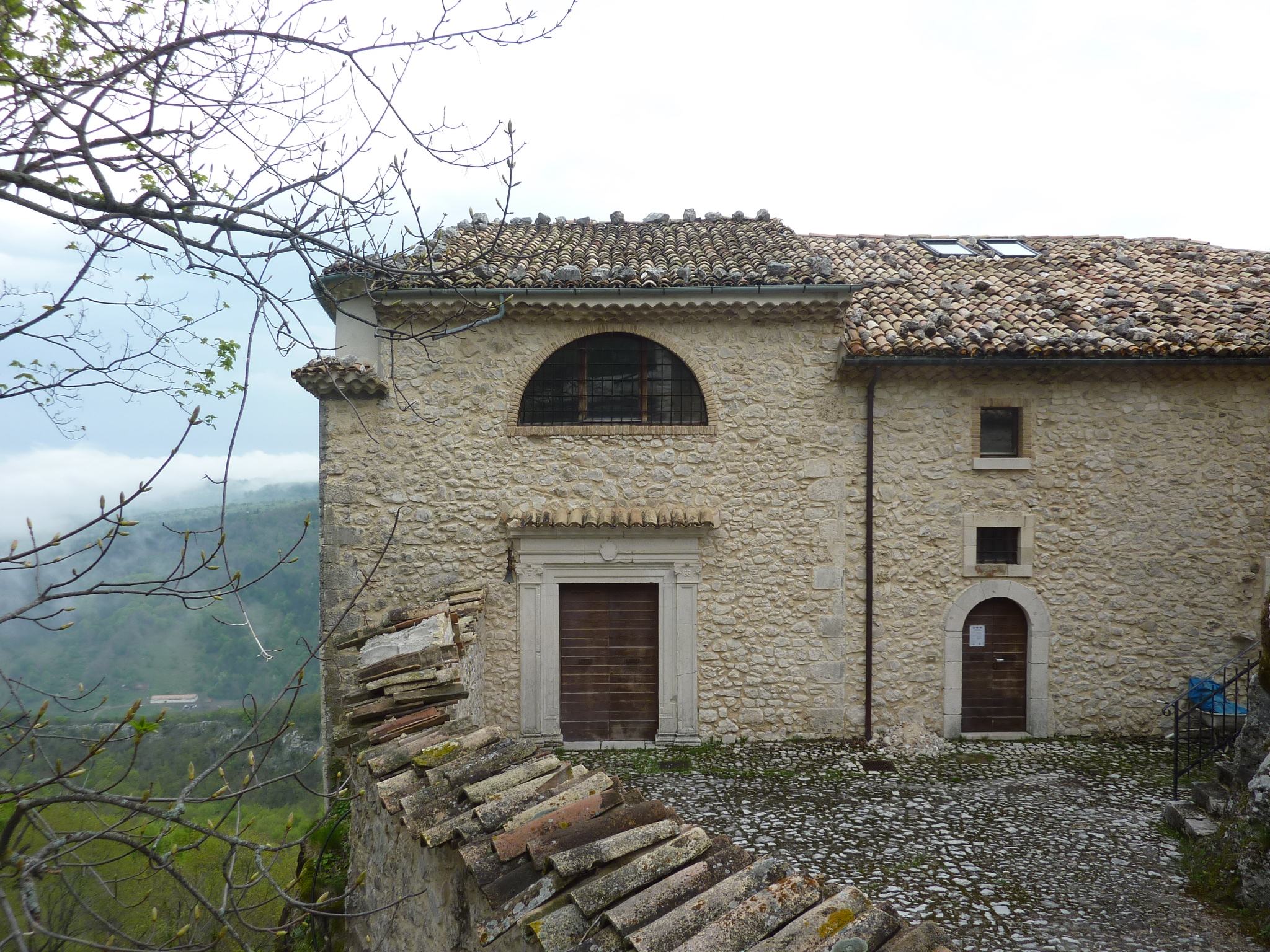
- View of the hermitage

- Location within Abruzzo

Religion
- Affiliation: Roman Catholic
- Province: Province of Chieti
- Region: Abruzzo

Location
- Municipality: Palena
- State: Italy
- Interactive map of Hermitage of Madonna dell'Altare

Architecture
- Completed: 11th-century

Eremo della Madonna dell'Altare (Italian for Hermitage of Madonna dell'Altare) is an hermitage located in Palena, Province of Chieti (Abruzzo, Italy).

== History ==
Pietro da Morrone, in 1235-36, left the hermitage of Castel di Sangro to seek a more remote and solitary place. Crossing the Forchetta pass, he arrived at a rocky spur and stayed for about four years in a nearby cave.

In the 14th century, the Celestine monks built a religious building. With the abolition of the Celestine Order in 1807, the religious complex passed into the management of the Perticone family, which donated the religious buildings to the municipality of Palena in 1970.

The toponym "altare" (altar), according to some scholars, is due to the shape of the rock resembling an altar.

== Architecture ==
The hermitage is located on a cliff that makes the building impassable on three sides. The religious complex consists of a church, a residential center, and a rooftop garden.

The residential center is organized on three levels, including the basement. The portals of the residential center have lintels and rounded arches.

The church has a rectangular plan and a gable roof in the southern part and an irregular roof in the north. The facade features a linteled portal with jambs, a molded cornice, and a frieze with a central coat of arms. On either side of the portal are two pilasters adorned with six capitals featuring volute and floral motifs. Above the portal is a semicircular opening with a lowered arch.
