= Claudia M. Palena =

Argentine immunologist

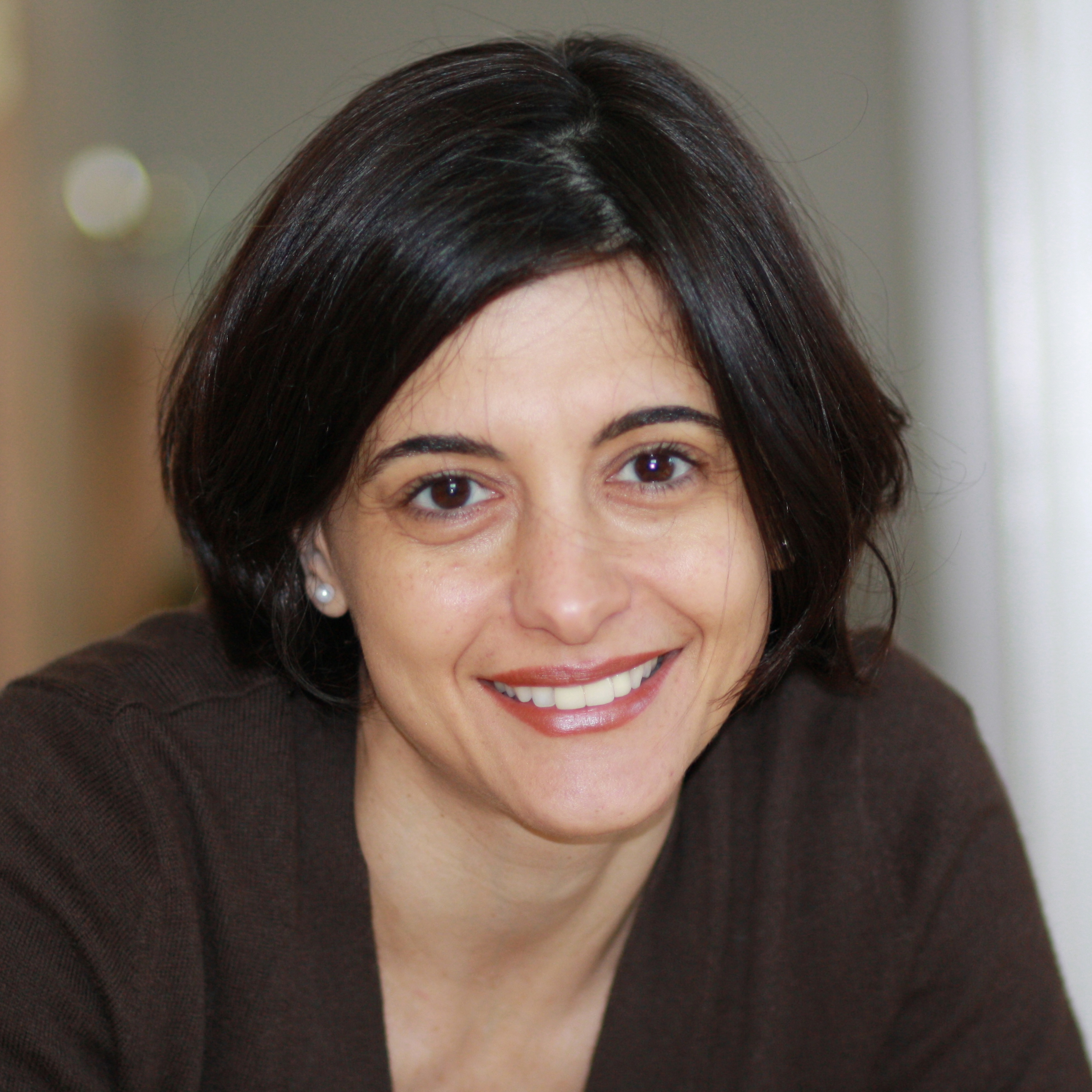
- Education: National University of Rosario (BS, PhD)
- Scientific career
- Fields: Tumor immunology, cancer immunotherapy
- Workplaces: National Cancer Institute

Claudia M. Palena is an American immunologist and cancer researcher working to advance cancer vaccines. She is a senior investigator and head of the immunoregulation section at the National Cancer Institute. Palena researches tumor immunology and cancer immunotherapy. IRP senior investigator Claudia Palena is now leading and over watching possible vaccines that might help the immune system fight off cancer.

== Life ==
Palena received a B.S. and Ph.D. degree in biochemistry from the National University of Rosario. She came to the National Cancer Institute (NCI) in 2000 as a postdoctoral researcher in the laboratory of tumor immunology and biology.

Palena became a staff scientist in 2008. In 2011, she was promoted to tenure-track investigator in 2011. Palena became a tenured senior investigator in 2017. She heads the immunoregulation section in the NCI laboratory of tumor immunology and biology. Palena is active in the field of tumor immunology and cancer immunotherapy.

=== Research ===
Palena's current research is focused on the development of immunotherapeutic approaches aimed at targeting critical events in tumor progression with the ultimate goal of designing vaccine platforms and combinatorial therapies for the prevention and/or treatment of metastases in human cancer.

Palena’s research team discovered a protein that plays a key role in tumors’ ability to metastasize and become resistant to standard therapies like chemotherapy and radiation. The molecule, called T-box transcription factor brachyury, is a protein that was long thought to exist only on cells that are part of a developing embryo.

The main goal of her research is to address the two central features of metastatic disease: tumor dissemination and resistance to therapy. Her group is investigating how changes in the phenotype of a tumor between the epithelial and a mesenchymal-like states (a phenomenon called carcinoma mesenchymalization) could facilitate the dissemination of the tumor cells and make them resistant to anticancer therapies. Palena's laboratory has identified the T-box transcription factor brachyury—a molecule normally expressed in the embryo but absent in normal adult tissues—as a novel tumor antigen, a driver of mesenchymalization and drug resistance in human carcinoma cells, and a target for T-cell-mediated immunotherapy. Her studies have shown that brachyury is overexpressed in various human carcinomas, both in the primary tumor and in metastatic sites, and that high brachyury expression in the primary tumor site is associated with poor clinical outcomes. The results of these investigations led to a team science effort—including her laboratory, scientists and clinicians from the intramural and extramural scientific communities, and collaborators in the private sector—that resulted in the translation of two brachyury-based cancer vaccines from preclinical stage into phase 1 and phase 2 clinical trials in patients with advanced carcinomas and the rare tumor chordoma.

Palena's laboratory investigates the various signals that induce changes in tumor phenotype. They have demonstrated that brachyury overexpression induces the secretion of interleukin-8 (IL-8) and the expression of IL-8 receptors, and that IL-8 signaling is critical for maintaining the mesenchymal characteristics of human tumor cells.

In July, 2024, Palena co-authored an article detailing the possibilities of using newly developed RNA-based vaccines as cancer immunotherapy. Later in December of the same year, Palena co-authored a scientific research paper on a new hybrid therapy treatment for HPV-negative head and neck squamous cell carcinoma (HNSCC), a type of head and neck cancer. In May, 2025, Palena co-authored a paper discussing a new type of therapeutic cancer vaccine targeting the endogenous retroviral envelope protein ERVMER34-1 with immune-oncology agents, concluding that this approach warranted further clinical testing after the study saw positive results of tumor control though expanding neoepitope-specific T cells.
