= Maiella =

Mountain massif in Abruzzo, Italy

- Monte Amaro
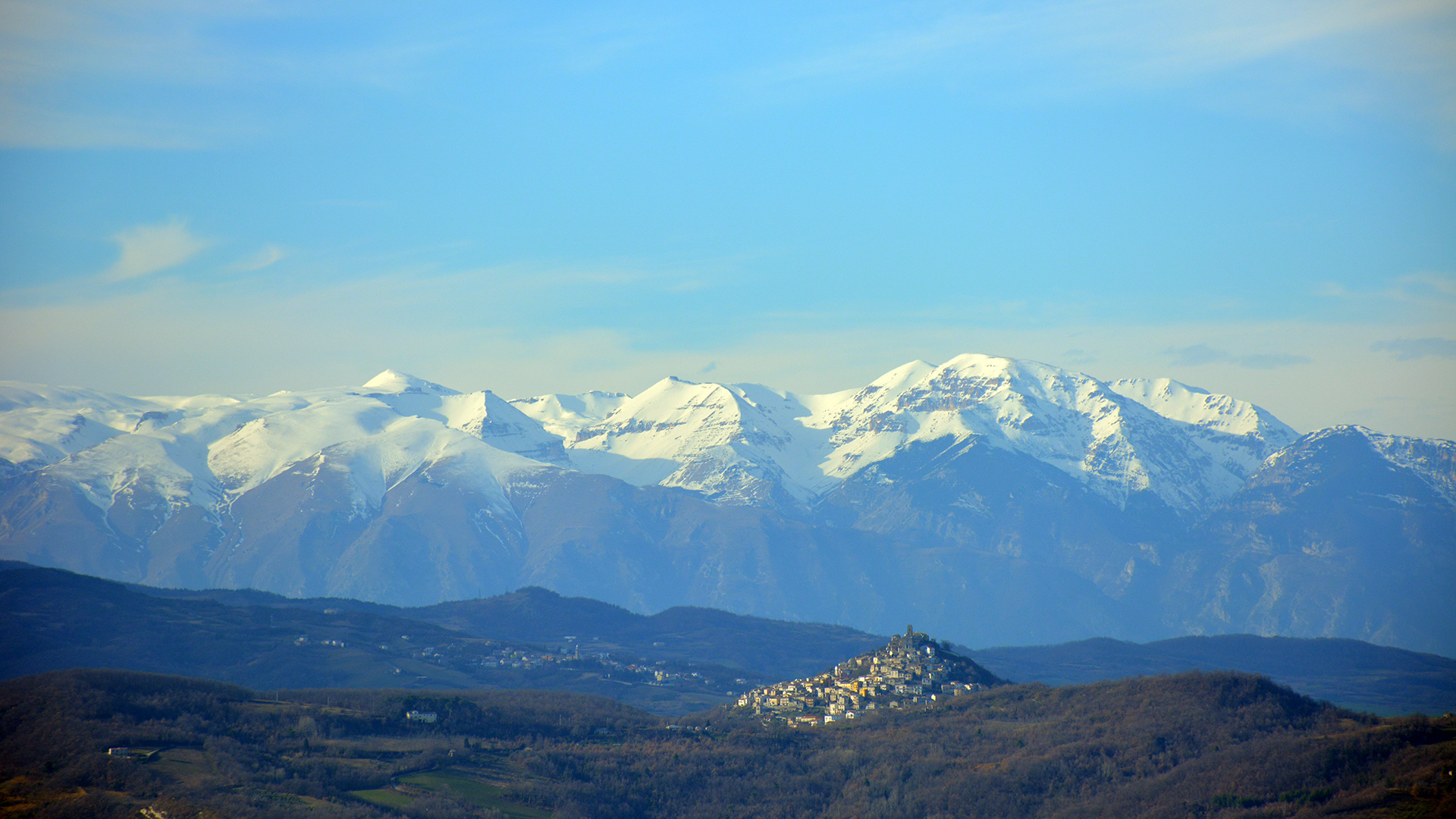

Highest point
- Elevation: 2,795 m (9,170 ft)
- Prominence: 1,812 m (5,945 ft)
- Listing: Ultra
- Coordinates: 42°05′13″N 14°05′15″E

Geography
- Location within Italy
- Location: Abruzzo, Italy
- Parent range: Apennine Mountains

Climbing
- First ascent: 1873

The Maiella (or Majella, Majèlla in Abruzzese language) is a massif in the Central Apennines, in Abruzzo, central Italy.

== Geography ==
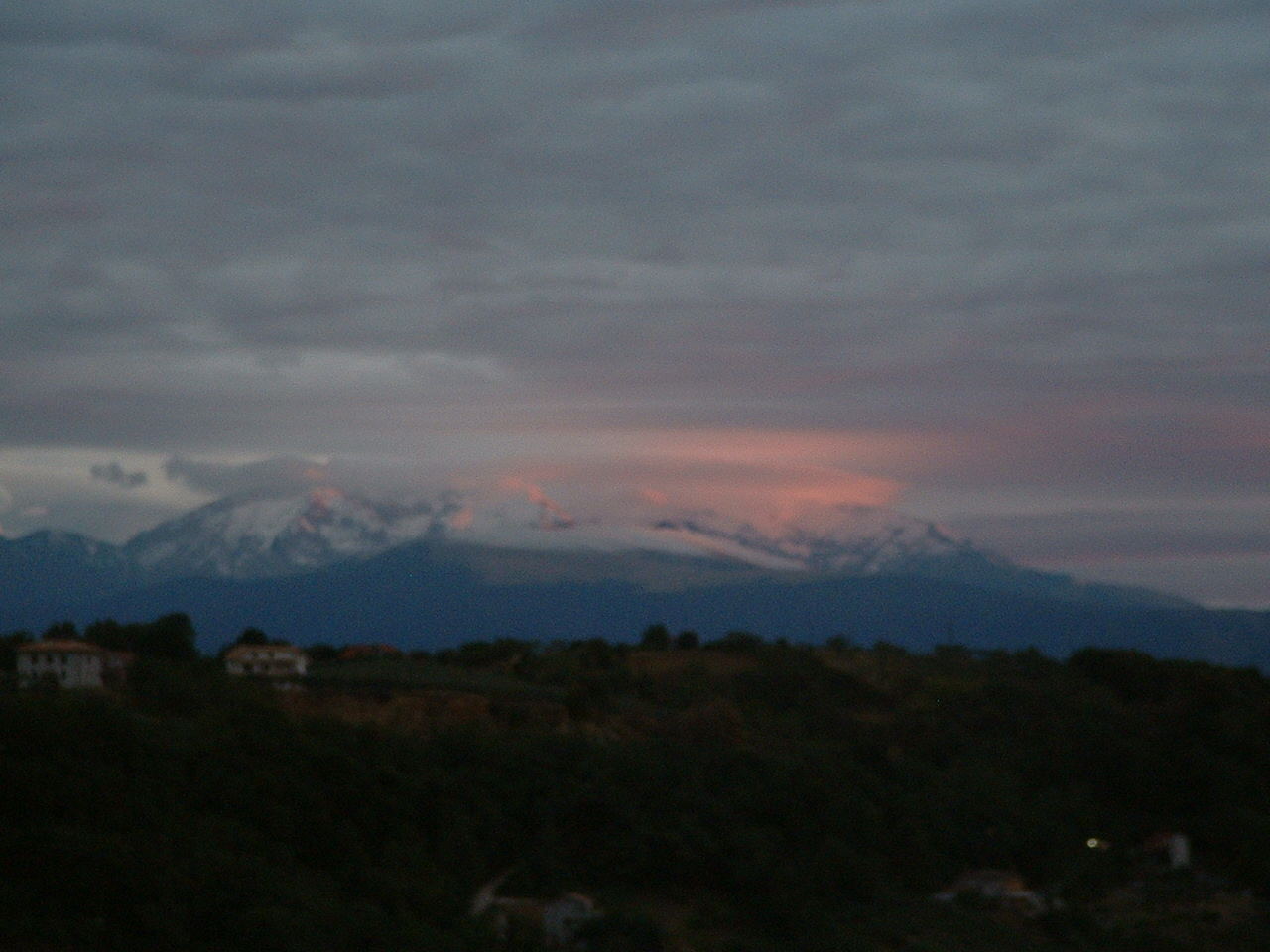
Maiella at dusk

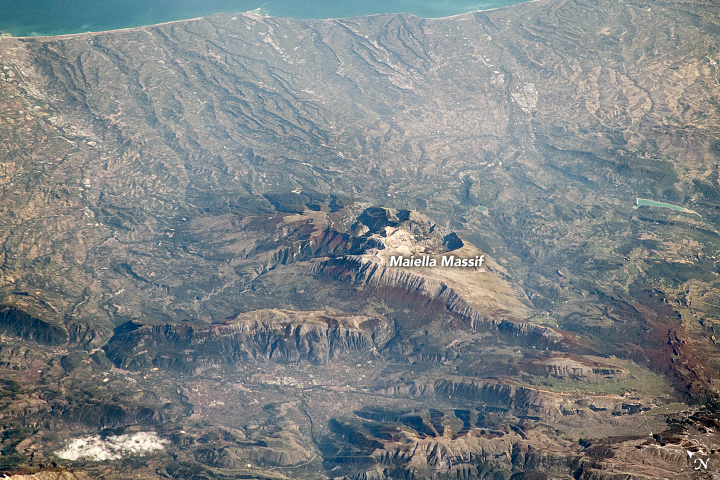
Maiella Massif from ISS, 2019. To the northeast is the Adriatic Sea.

The mountain is located at the boundary between the provinces of Chieti, Pescara and L'Aquila.

The highest peak is Monte Amaro at 2,793 metres (9,163 ft), the second-highest of the entire Apennine range. The massif is at the centre of the Maiella National Park.

The Maiella is formed by a compact limestone massif, on which summit are the highest peaks in the group: Monte Amaro 2,793 m, Monte Acquaviva 2,737 m, Monte Focalone 2,676 m, Monte Rotondo 2,656 m, Monte Macellaro 2,646 m, Pesco Falcone 2,546 m, Cima delle Murelle 2,598 m. A further peak is the Blockhaus (2,145m), which is sometimes used as the finish of a stage of the Giro d'Italia cycling race.

Vast plateaus are present up to 2,500 m. The slopes are characterized by steep valleys and gorges, carved out by rivers such as the Orfento, the Foro and others.

Nearby are the Monte Morrone, Monte Porrara and Monti Pizzi groups. The Maiella includes an iced waterfall, known as Il Principiante, located at 1,600 metres and having a height of 25 metres.

== History ==
The massif was the site of the 1706 Abruzzo earthquake, which measured 6.8 M_{w}. It devastated many towns in Abruzzo.

== Scientific research ==
The area of the Montagna della Maiella has been subject to a major international geoscientific research Project, TaskForceMajella, from 1998 up to 2005. Along the northern slope of the mountain for thousands of years, hydrocarbon extraction has occurred from spontaneous seepages and shallow wells.

== Cycling ==
The Maiella, particularly the Blockhaus peak, is a popular ride for amateur cyclists and is also sometimes used for a stage of the Giro d'Italia. The first use by the race was in 1967, when Eddy Merckx won the stage. Merckx subsequently went on to establish a cycle manufacturing company and named one of his cycles after the Blockhaus. Subsequent Blockhaus stage victors were Franco Bitossi (1968), José Manuel Fuente (1972), Moreno Argentin (1984), Ivan Basso (2006), Franco Pellizotti (2009, subsequently disqualified), Nairo Quintana (2017) and Jai Hindley (2022). The most recent inclusion of the Blockhaus in the Giro d'Italia was on 15 May 2026, when the stage was won by the Danish rider Jonas Vingegaard.

The Blockhaus climb was used for the first time in Giro d'Italia Women during stage 7 of the 2024 edition, in which Neve Bradbury won the stage.

== See also ==
- List of European ultra prominent peaks
- Monte Porrara
- Monte Amaro (Abruzzo)
- Monte Castelfraiano
