= Maiella National Park =

National park in Italy

Parco Nazionale della Maiella
- IUCN category II (national park)
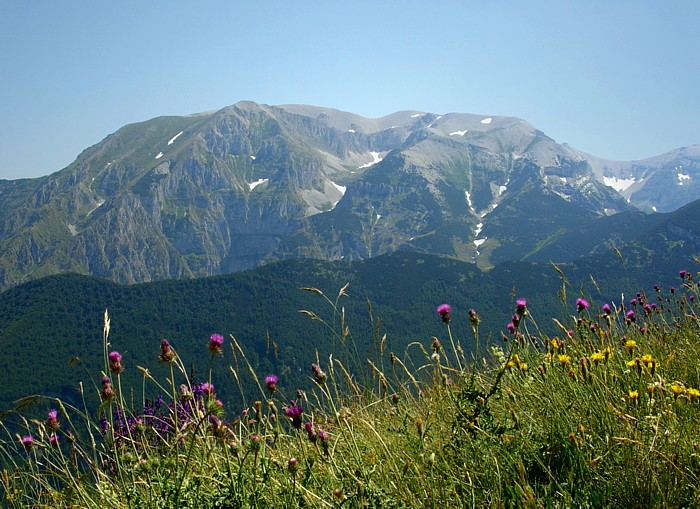
- Majella Massif

- Location within Italy
- Location: Abruzzo
- Nearest city: Sulmona
- Coordinates: 42°4′55″N 14°3′36″E
- Area: 628.38 km^{2} (242.62 sq mi)
- Established: 1991
- Governing body: Ministero dell'Ambiente
- Website: http://www.parks.it/parco.nazionale.majella/Eindex.html

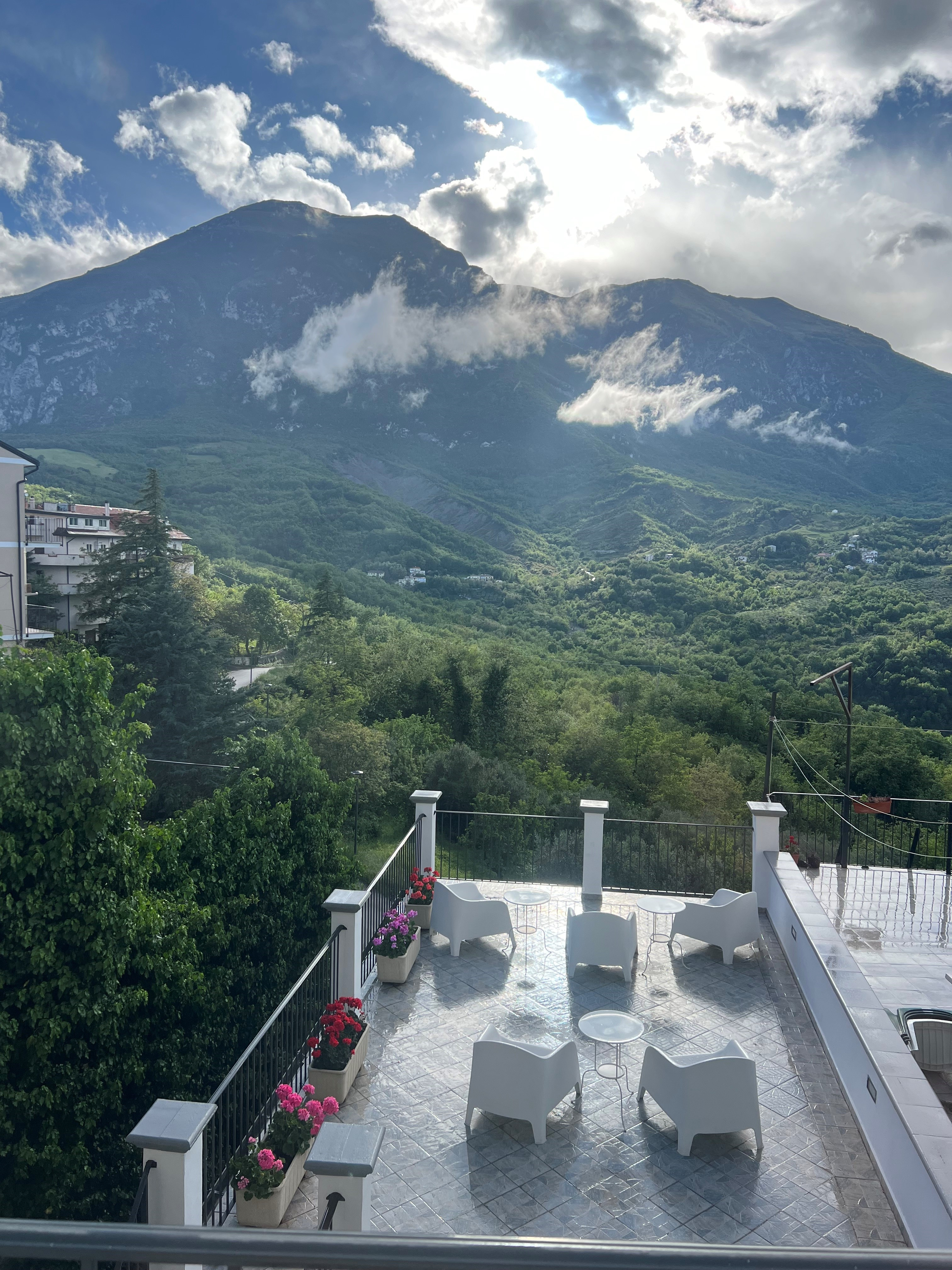

Maiella National Park (Italian: Parco Nazionale della Maiella) is located in the provinces of Chieti, Pescara and L'Aquila, in the region of Abruzzo, Italy. It is centered on the Maiella massif, of which Monte Amaro is the highest peak, at 2,793 m (9,163 ft) elevation.

It is one of Italy's 24 national parks and one of three national parks in Abruzzo. It was established in 1991.

The 740.95 km^{2} (286.08 sq mi) large area of Maiella National Park, especially the Montagna della Majella, has been subject to a major international geoscientific research project, TaskForceMajella, from 1998 up to 2005. Along the northern slope of the mountain for thousands of years hydrocarbon extraction has occurred from spontaneous seepages and shallow wells. On 21 April 2021, Maiella National Park was declared a UNESCO Global Geopark under the name of Majella Geopark.

== Wildlife ==
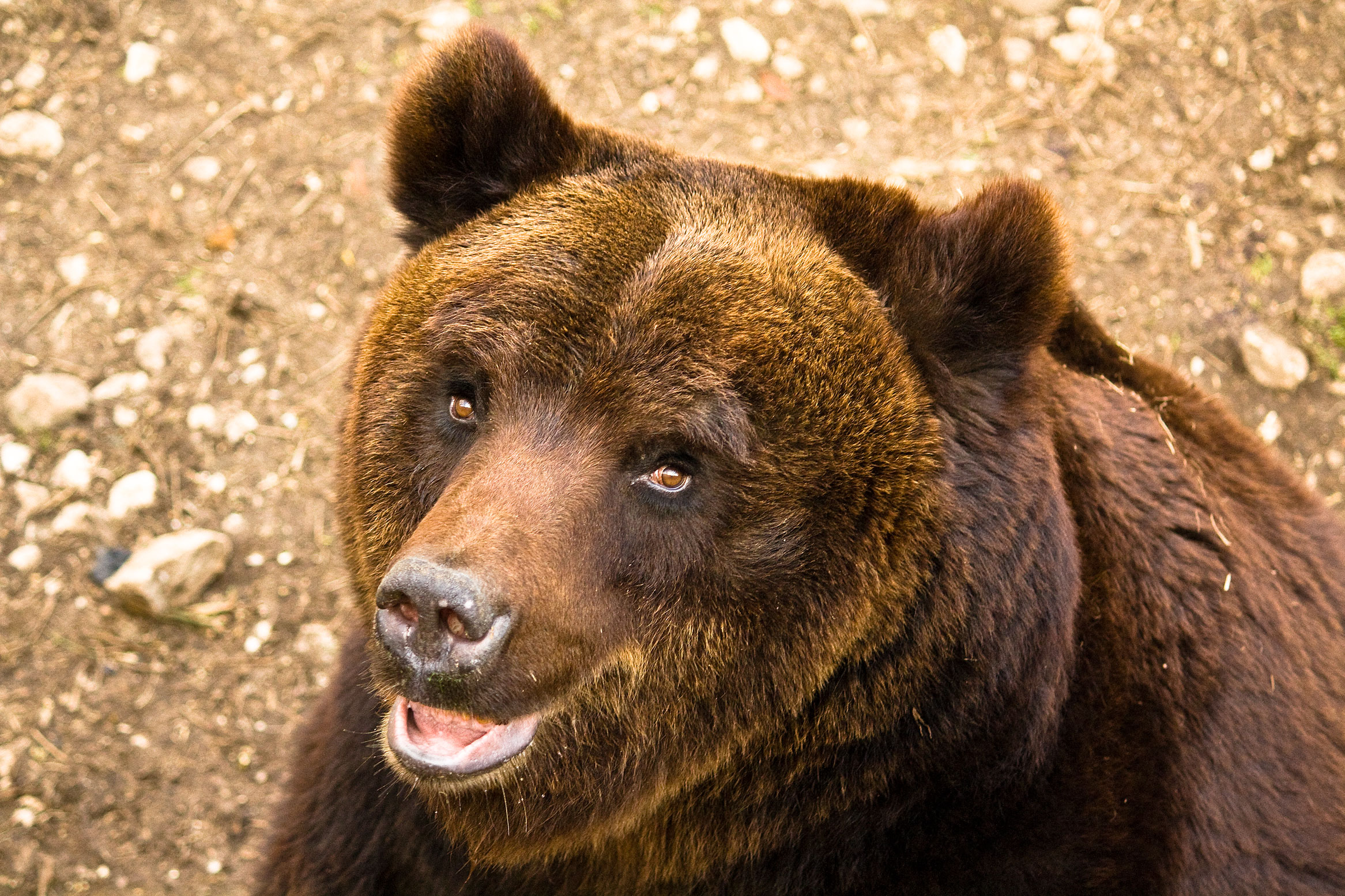
Marsican brown bear

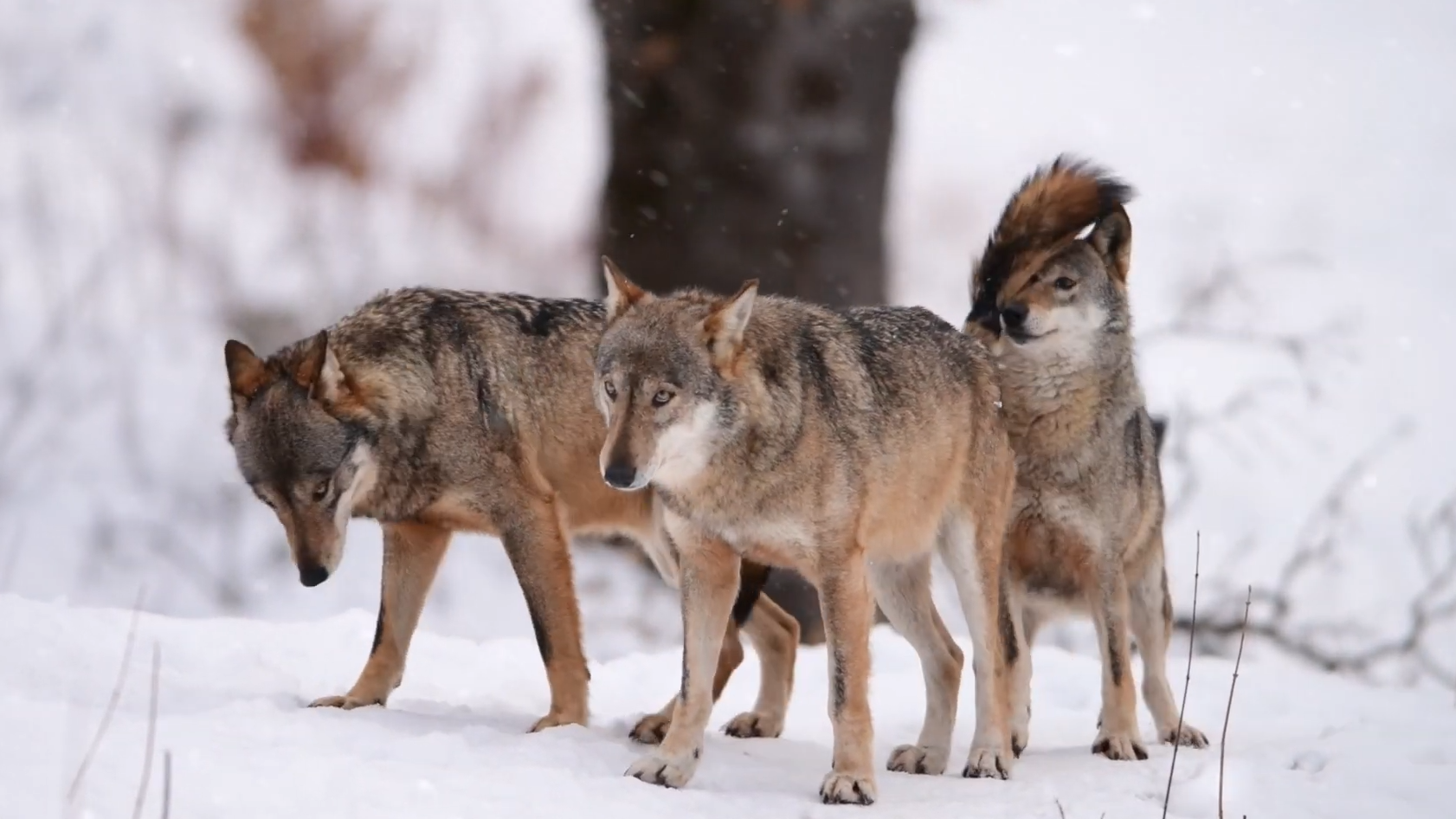
Italian wolves

Due to its altitude, inaccessibility and prominence most of the park's territories are uninhabited and so the human-made structures, including skiing resorts and roads, are fewer than those in other national parks of Italy. This condition favored the Apennine wildlife which is shown here in all its greatness. The most representative animal of the Majella territories is the Italian wolf which is also present in the park's logo and it relies on a population of 100 estimated wolves distributed in eleven packs across the main mountain ranges of the protected area. GPS-collars are applied to 17 wolves for ongoing monitoring. It is believed that the wolf population density of the Majella national park is one of the highest in Italy and in the world even if compared to Yellowstone national park.

Notable also the presence of species of the following animals:

- In the high slopes the Abruzzo chamois (Rupicapra pyrenaica ornata) which has been reintroduced, after decades of absence, during 1991 thanks to a repopulation program carried up by the Abruzzo national park authorities;
- The Marsican brown bear (Ursus arctos marsicanus) is regularly present in the national park's beech forests and neighboring areas, with estimated 20 individuals, representing one of the biggest concentration of bears in one protected area of Central Italy;
- The Golden eagle, with six breeding couples;
- The red and roe deer which have also been reintroduced in the park after the WWII, when they were extinct throughout the Central Apennines.

The amphibians and reptiles that live in this mountainous landscape are the spectacled salamander, the yellow-billed toad and the unique Orsini's viper.

Also goshawk, buzzard, rock partridge, alpine and red-billed chough, peregrine falcon and sparrow hawk are some important bird species that breed inside the park.

Finally other mammals that thrive in the dense forests that surround the majella massif are the wild boar, the Corsican hare, the European pine marten, the European wildcat, the red fox, the European badger and the rare European otter.
