= Minervino Murge =

Comune in Apulia, Italy

Minervino Murge Menarvèine (Neapolitan)
- Comune
- Comune di Minervino Murge
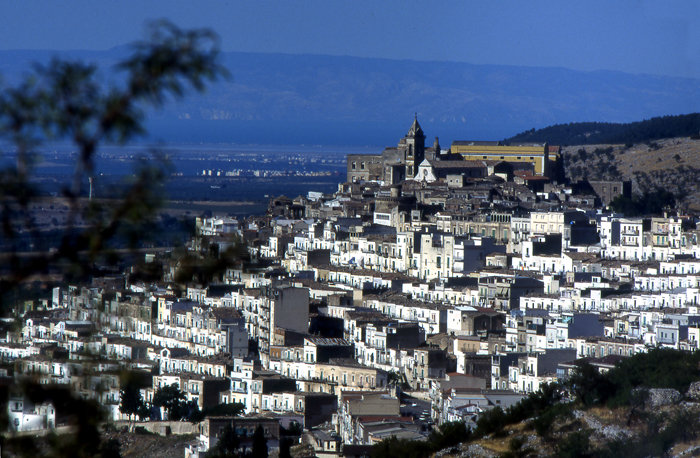

- Coat of arms

- Location within Italy Location within Apulia
- Coordinates: 41°6′N 16°5′E
- Country: Italy
- Region: Apulia
- Province: Barletta-Andria-Trani (BT)

Government
  - Mayor: Maria Laura Mancini

Area
  - Total: 255.38 km^{2} (98.60 sq mi)
- Elevation: 445 m (1,460 ft)

Population (31 December 2010)
  - Total: 9,528
  - Density: 37.31/km^{2} (96.63/sq mi)
- Demonym: Minervinesi
- Time zone: UTC+1 (CET)
  - Summer (DST): UTC+2 (CEST)
- Postal code: 76013
- Dialing code: 0883
- Patron saint: St. Michael Archangel
- Saint day: 29 September

Minervino Murge (Central Apulian: Menarvèine [mənarˈvɛinə]) is a town and comune, a former bishopric, and present Latin Catholic titular see in the administrative province of Barletta-Andria-Trani in the region of Apulia in southern Italy, on the western flank of the Murgia Barese mountain chain.

It gained its present name in 1836; it was formerly known as just Minervino.

It is 16 kilometres (10 mi) south of Canosa di Puglia and 17 kilometres (11 mi) north of Spinazzola, in the Alta Murgia National Park.

The town's economy is based mainly on agriculture and herding. The karstic geology of the area has conditioned its main crops: grapes, olives, wheat, and almonds.

== Ecclesiastical history ==
The town was established circa 900 as the Diocese of Minervino (Italian: Minervino; Latin: Minerbium), with two municipal components: Minervino itself and Montemilone (now in the administrative province of Potenza). The see is documented first in a papal bull in 1025 by Pope John XIX to Archbishop Bisanzio of Bari, specifying the jurisdictions under the Metropolitan Archbishop of Bari, but the document is disputed.

Local tradition and a list of incumbents in the episcopal palace starts the apostolic succession with Bisanzio in 1069, but he may well have been bishop of Lavello instead. The bishopric was a suffragan of the metropolitan of Bari no later than 1152, if not from the start; but disputed papal bulls suggest it may have been suffragan of the Archdiocese of Trani before being suppressed on 27 June 1818, its territory being merged into the Diocese of Andria. However, in 1976, the comune Montemilone was transferred to the Diocese of Venosa.

=== Bishops of Minervino ===
- Ignatius = Innazio (recorded in 1071)
- Mandus? (in 1102)
- Johannes = Giovanni (in 1122)
- Maraldo (?-1171/1177, deposed)
- Apparently the see was vacant in 1179, as the see was not represented at the Third Council of the Lateran
- Leopardo (1180–1197)
- Riccardo, Benedictine Order (O.S.B.) (1215 – after 1219)
- An anonymous incumbent (1234)
- Pietro di Cerignola (16 March 1255 – 13 March 1256), then Bishop-elect of Roman Catholic Diocese of Canne
- Biviano (1271–1276)
- Antonio di Gaeta, Dominican Order (O.P.) (1298 – ?)
- Trasmondo (1310)
- Giacomo (1321)
- Rainaldo di Provenza (1344–1352)
- Lorenzo (14 November 1353 – 1365)
- Leonardo Arnini (22 August 1426 – 1433, death)
- Sancio (14 January 1433 – 1434), previously bishop of Civita (Sardinia) (? – 14 January 1433)
- Goffredo (15 September 1434 – 1456, death)
- Giovanni Campanella, Benedictine Order (O.S.B.) (13 April 1456 – 1478?, death)
- Marino Cieri (15 October 1478 – 1491?, death)
- Roberto de Noya, Dominican Order (O.P.) (13 January 1492 – 15 May 1497), then bishop of Acerra (Italy) (15 May 1497 – 15 April 1504) and bishop of Naxos (insular Greece) (15 April 1504 – 1515, death)
- Marino Falconi (17 April 1497 – 1525, death)
- Antonio Sassolino, Conventual Friars Minor (O.F.M. Conv.) (21 July 1525 – 1528), previously superior general of the Conventual Franciscans
- Bernardino Fumarelli (7 August 1528 – 16 August 1529), then bishop of Alife (Italy) (16 August 1529 – 4 November 1532), bishop of Sulmona (Italy) (4 November 1532 – 5 June 1547), bishop of Valva (Italy) (4 November 1532 – 5 June 1547, death)
- Giovanni Francesco de Marellis (16 August 1529 – 1536, death)
- Gian Vincenzo Micheli (2 March 1545 – 1596, death, as centenarian), participant at the Tridentine Council (1545–1563), previously bishop of Lavello (30 May 1539 – 2 March 1545)
- Lorenzo Monzonís Galatina, O.F.M. (21 June 1596 – 1605), then auxiliary bishop in the archdiocese of Valencia (Spain) (1605 – 27 January 1610), archbishop of Lanciano (Italy) (27 January 1610 – 30 November 1617), archbishop-bishop of Pozzuoli (Italy) (20 November 1617 – 11 February 1630, death)
- Giacomo Antonio Caporali (9 January 1606 – 1616), consecrated the rebuilt cathedral
- Altobello Carissimi (30 January 1617 – 1632, death)
- Giovanni Michele Rossi, Carmelite Order (O. Carm.) (12 January 1633 – 11 April 1633, death)
- Gerolamo Maria Zambeccari, O.P. (11 April 1633 – 1635), previously Bishop of Alife (Italy) (7 April 1625 – 11 April 1633)
- Antonio Maria Pranzoni (6 May 1635 – 1663, death)
- Francesco Maria Vignola (24 September 1663 – 1700, death)
- Marcantonio Chenevix (20 November 1702 – July 1717, death)
- Nicola Pignatelli (9 February 1719 – 28 October 1734, death)
- Fabio Troyli (1 December 1734 – 1 February 1751), then Bishop of Catanzaro (Italy) (1 February 1751 – 1 August 1762, death)
- Stefano Gennaro Spani (15 March 1751 – April 1776, death)
- Pietro Silvio Di Gennaro (15 July 1776 – 12 July 1779), then Bishop of Venosa (Italy) (12 July 1779 – 1786, death)
- Pietro Mancini (27 February 1792 – 1808, death)

=== Titular see ===
The diocese was nominally restored in 1968 as Latin Titular bishopric of Minervino Murge (Curiate Italian) / Minervium (Latin) / Minerbinen(sis) (Latin).

It has had the following incumbents, of the fitting episcopal (lowest) rank :

- Ramón Torrella Cascante (22 October 1968 – 11 April 1983), as auxiliary bishop of the Archdiocese of Barcelona (Spain) (22 October 1968 – 6 November 1970), later as Roman Curia official: vice-president of Council of the Laity (6 November 1970 – 6 March 1974), vice-president of the Pontifical Commission of Justice and Peace (6 November 1970 – 20 December 1975), vice-president of the Pontifical Council "Cor unum" (22 July 1971 – 20 December 1975), vice-president of the Secretariat for Christian Unity (20 December 1975 – 11 April 1983), vice-president of Council of European Bishops' Conferences (1983 – 1993), then metropolitan archbishop of Tarragona (Spain) (11 April 1983 – 20 February 1997, retirement), died 2004.
- Ryszard Karpiński (28 September 1985 – present), as auxiliary bishop of Lublin (Poland) (28 September 1985 – 31 December 2011) and, later, emeritus.

== City sights ==
=== Former Cathedral of Mary Assumed ===
- The medieval former cathedral, now the Chiesa di Santa Maria Assunta, was built under Norman rule, but mostly rebuilt from 1519 until the consecration on 30 August 1608 by Bishop Giacomo Antonio Caporali (9 January 1606 – 1616).
- A document from 1667 specifies that it has 43 ecclesiastical officials, including an archdeacon, an archpriest, a primicerius, a cantor, 10 canons, 26 other priests, a deacon and two subdeacons.

=== Other sights ===
- The castle (14th century), later remade as a palazzo
- The Baroque church of the Immacolata Concezione
- A 15th-century tower
- Not far off are the Caves of Altamura.

== Twin towns ==
- Sagliano Micca, Italy, since 2009

== See also ==
- List of Catholic dioceses in Italy

== Sources ==
- Bibliography - ecclesiastical history, Ferdinando Ughelli, Italia sacra, vol. VII, second edition, Venice 1721, coll. 745–748
- Giuseppe Cappelletti, Le Chiese d'Italia dalla loro origine sino ai nostri giorni, Venice 1870, vol. XXI, pp. 82–85
- Konrad Eubel, Hierarchia Catholica Medii Aevi, vol. 1, p. 343; vol. 2, pp. XXXI, 193; vol. 3, p. 245; vol. 4, p. 243; vol. 5, p. 269; vol. 6, p. 290
- Pius Bonifacius Gams, Series episcoporum Ecclesiae Catholicae, Leipzig 1931, pp. 897–898
- Michele Garruba, Serie critica de' Sacri Pastori Baresi, Tipografia Fratelli Cannone, Bari 1844, pp. 965–966
- Norbert Kamp, Kirche und Monarchie im staufischen Königreich Sizilien, vol. 2, Prosopographische Grundlegung: Bistümer und Bischöfe des Königreichs 1194 - 1266; Apulien und Kalabrien, Munich 1975, pp. 640–642
- Paul Fridolin Kehr, Italia Pontificia, vol. IX, Berlin 1962, p. 344
- Papal Bulla De utiliori, in Bullarii Romani continuatio, Vol. XV, Rome 1853, pp. 56–61
- Cronotassi dei vescovi di Minervino, pp. 45–47
