= Giuseppe Di Falco =

Italian Roman Catholic bishop (born 1930)

The Most Reverend Giuseppe Di Falco
- Bishop Emeritus of Sulmona-Valva
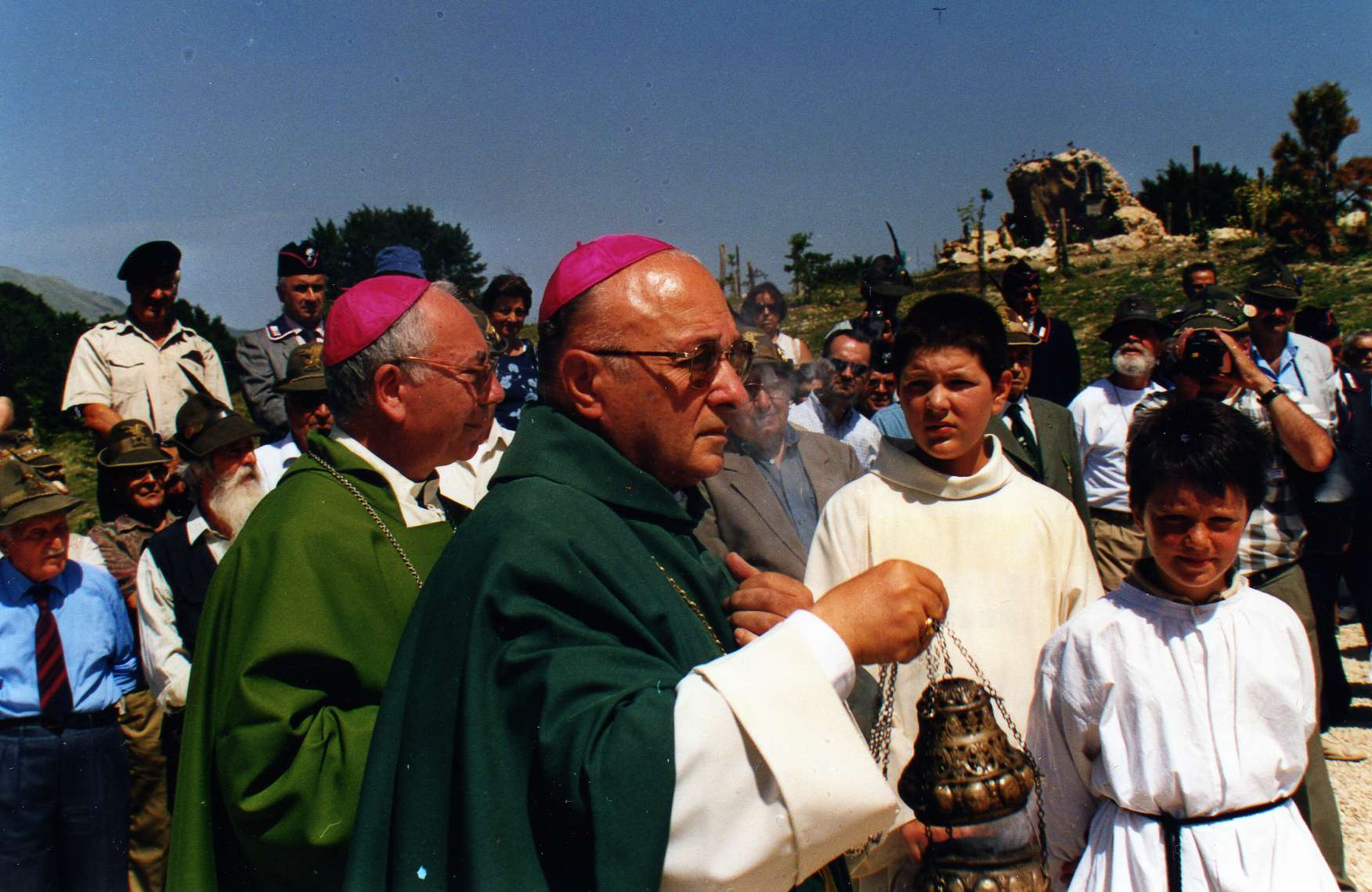
- Mons. Di Falco, in the foreground, at the inauguration of the Mauriziano Shrine on 4 August 2002
- Church: Catholic Church
- Province: L'Aquila
- Diocese: Sulmona-Valva
- Appointed: 25 May 1985
- Term ended: 3 April 2007
- Predecessor: Salvatore Delogu
- Successor: Angelo Spina

Orders
- Ordination: 29 June 1953
- Consecration: 14 July 1985

Personal details
- Born: 13 May 1930 (age 96) Casalincontrada, Province of Chieti, Kingdom of Italy
- Denomination: Catholic
- Motto: Unus panis unum corpus
- Coat of arms

Giuseppe Di Falco (born 13 May 1930) is an Italian Roman Catholic prelate, who served as bishop of the Diocese of Sulmona-Valva from 1985 until his retirement in 2007.

== Early life and priesthood ==
Di Falco was born on 13 May 1930 in Casalincontrada, in the Province of Chieti, part of the Abruzzo region of Italy. He belongs to the Archdiocese of Chieti-Vasto.

He completed his studies in the minor and major seminaries of Chieti and was ordained a priest on 29 June 1953.

During his early ministry he served as vice-parish priest of the cathedral parish in Vasto and later as vice-rector of the seminary of Chieti. He was parish priest of San Panfilo in Scerni (1956–1964) and subsequently the first parish priest of San Camillo de Lellis in Chieti, where he oversaw the construction of the parish complex. He also held diocesan responsibilities including youth pastoral work, episcopal vicar for associations and movements, and pro-vicar general of the archdiocese.

== Episcopal ministry ==
On 25 May 1985, Pope John Paul II appointed Di Falco bishop of Valva and Sulmona. He was consecrated bishop on 14 July 1985. He took canonical possession of the diocese on 31 August 1985.

Following the full union of the dioceses in 1986, he became bishop of the Diocese of Sulmona-Valva, which is a suffragan of the Archdiocese of L'Aquila.

His resignation, submitted upon reaching the age limit prescribed by canon law, was accepted by Pope Benedict XVI on 3 April 2007. He was succeeded by Angelo Spina.

== Later life ==
After his retirement, Di Falco has continued to participate in diocesan celebrations and pastoral initiatives. In 2016 he presided at a Mass during the Year of Consecrated Life, encouraging the faithful to “look to the future to do great things by exercising mercy.”

In 2023 the Diocese of Sulmona-Valva celebrated the 70th anniversary of his priestly ordination.
