= Diocese of Canne =

A bishopric was established at Cannae in 900 as Diocese of Canne (Curiate Italian) / Cannæ (Latin) / Cannen(sis) (Latin adjective), without direct precursor, suffragan of the Metropolitan Archdiocese of Bari.

Saint Roger of Cannae (c. 1060 - 1138) was the most notable of the bishops.

In 1355, its bishop Raynaldus and the University of Barletta petitioned to move the diocesan see to the town of Barletta, but in Rome the archbishop of Trani successfully opposed such intrusion on his jurisdiction.

Pope Martin V issued a papal bulla on 11 December 1424 to merge the bishopric of Canne into Trani, but it seems to have been ignored. Instead, in 1455, Canne was united aeque principaliter (in personal union) with the 'crusader see in exile' Archdiocese of Nazareth (in Barletta).

On 1818.06.27 it was suppressed, according to the concordat with king Ferdinando I of Naples, by Pius VII's papal bulla De utiliori, its territory being merged into the Metropolitan Archdiocese of Trani. and the diocese of Cannae is today listed by the Catholic Church as a titular see.

== Residential Bishops ==
(all Latin Rite)

- Giovanni (c. 1071)
- Roger of Cannae (1100 – 1129)
- Giovanni (1129? – ?)
- Giovanni (1158? – 1179?)
- Pasquale (1209? – ?)
- Pietro (1256 – 1256)
- ...
- Teobaldo, Friars Minor (O.F.M.) (1266.06.27 – 1290)
- ...
- Teobaldo (1304? – ?)
- Bernardo (1341? – ?)
- Rainaldo (? – ?)
- Antonio, Augustinians (O.E.S.A.) (1376.03.03 – ?)
- Pietro (1384 – 1390)
- ...
- Giovanni (1412 – 1424)
- Nicola (1429 – ?)
- Riccardo (1439 – death 1439)
- Gioacchino Suhare (1439.06.08 – 1440.12.12), previously Bishop of Sovana (Italy) (1434.01.20 – 1439.06.08); later Bishop of Cassano all’Jonio (Italy) (1440.12.12 – 1463)
- Giacomo Aurilia, O.F.M. (1449.05.25 – 1483), also Metropolitan Archbishop of Nazareth in Barletta (Italy) (1455.07.11 – 1483)

From 1455, Canne was united aeque principaliter (in personal union) with the 'crusader see in exile' Archdiocese of Nazareth in Barletta (viz.), hence its Archbishops were always Bishop of Canne (although the first incumbent's initial see was Canne) : see there.

== Titular bishops ==
In 1966 the diocese was nominally restored as Titular See of Canne (Italian) / Cannæ (Latin) / Cannen(sis) (Latin adjective).

It has had the following incumbents, of the fitting Episcopal (lowest) rank, with an archiepiscopal exception :

- Giuseppe Carata (1967.04.08 – 1971.08.28) while Auxiliary Bishop of Archdiocese of Trani (Italy) (1965.05.17 – 1971.08.28); previously Titular Bishop of Præsidium (1965.05.17 – 1967.04.08); later Metropolitan Archbishop of above Trani (Italy) (1971.08.28 – 1980.10.20), last Archbishop of Barletta (Italy) (1971.08.28 – merger 1986.09.30), Apostolic Administrator of Diocese of Bisceglie (Italy) (1971.08.28 – merger 1986.09.30), Titular Archbishop of Nazareth (1971.08.28 – 1989), see demote to non-Metropolitan Archbishop of Trani (1980.10.20 – 1986.09.30), restyled first Archbishop of Trani–Barletta–Bisceglie (Italy) (1986.09.30 merger – retired 1990.12.15), died 2003
- Salvatore Delogu (1972.04.15 – 1974.02.02) as Auxiliary Bishop of Archdiocese of Cagliari (Sardinia, Italy) (1972.04.15 – 1974.02.02); later Bishop of Ogliastra (Italy) (1974.02.02 – 1981.01.08), Bishop of Sulmona (Italy) (1981.01.08 – 1985.05.25), Bishop of Valva (Italy) (1981.01.08 – retired 1985.05.25), died 2001
- Joseph Marie Louis Duval (1974.05.14 – 1978.06.05) as Auxiliary Bishop of Archdiocese of Rennes (Brittanny, France) (1974.05.14 – 1978.06.05); later Coadjutor Archbishop of Rouen (Normandy, France) (1978.06.05 – 1981.05.06), succeeding as Metropolitan Archbishop of Rouen (1981.05.06 – retired 2003.10.16), President of Bishops’ Conference of France (1990 – 1996); died 2009
- Titular Archbishop (1979.04.22 – present): Archbishop Alfio Rapisarda

== Sources and external links ==
- GCatholic - data on former and titular bishopric

Bibliography

- Hammond, N.G.L. & Scullard, H.H. (Eds.) (1970). The Oxford Classical Dictionary (p. 201). Oxford: Oxford University Press. ISBN 0-19-869117-3.
- Berry, Small, Talbert, Elliott, Gillies, Becker, 'Cannae' in Pleiades Gazetteer: http://pleiades.stoa.org/places/442523
- Giuseppe Cappelletti, Le Chiese d'Italia dalla loro origine sino ai nostri giorni, Venice, 1870, vol. XXI, pp. 66-69
- Pius Bonifacius Gams, Series episcoporum Ecclesiae Catholicae, Leipzig 1931, pp. 865-866
- Konrad Eubel, 'Hierarchia Catholica Medii Aevi, vol. 1, p. 162; vol. 2, p. 117
- Bolla De utiliori, in Bullarii romani continuatio, Vol. XV, Rome 1853, pp. 56-61
