= Michele Fusco =

Roman Catholic bishop (born 1963)

Most Reverend Michele Fusco
- Bishop of Sulmona-Valva
- Archdiocese: L'Aquila
- Diocese: Sulmona-Valva
- Appointed: 30 November 2017
- Predecessor: Angelo Spina
- Successor: Incumbent

Orders
- Ordination: 25 June 1988 by Archbishop Ferdinando Palatucci
- Consecration: 4 January 2018 by Crescenzio Cardinal Sepe

Personal details
- Born: 6 December 1963 (age 62) Piano di Sorrento, Italy
- Denomination: Roman Catholic
- Motto: PAX VOBIS
- Coat of arms

Bishop Michele Fusco (born 6 December 1963) is an Italian Roman Catholic prelate, who currently serving as bishop of the Roman Catholic Diocese of Sulmona-Valva, Italy.

== Early life and education ==
He was born on 6 December 1963 in Piano di Sorrento, Italy.

== Priesthood ==
On 25 June 1988 he was ordained a priest by Archbishop Ferdinando Palatucci at Positano, Italy.

== Episcopate ==
Fusco was appointed bishop of Sulmona-Valva on 30 November 2017 by Pope Francis. He was consecrated a bishop by Crescenzio Cardinal Sepe on 4 January 2018 at Amalfi Cathedral.
