= Scerni =

- Comune
- Comune di Scerni
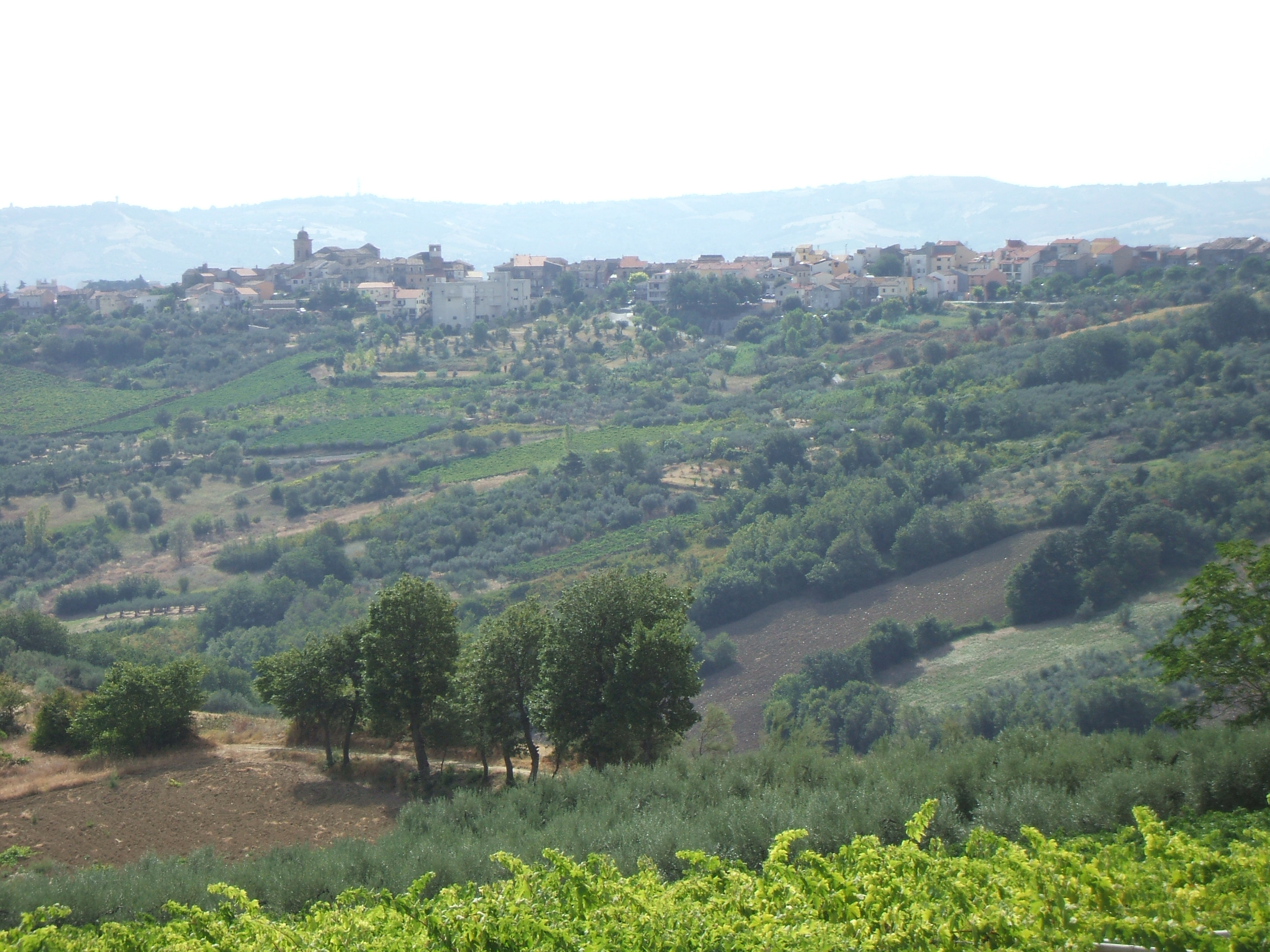
- A panorama of Scerni

- Location within Italy Location within Abruzzo
- Coordinates: 42°7′N 14°34′E
- Country: Italy
- Region: Abruzzo
- Province: Chieti (CH)
- Frazioni: Annunziata, Bardella, Caltrucci, Cerase, Colle Marrollo, Colle Orzo, Fontenuova, Piano dei Fiori, Ragna, San Giacomo, Torrone, Tratturo

Area
  - Total: 41.05 km^{2} (15.85 sq mi)
- Elevation: 281 m (922 ft)

Population (2008)
  - Total: 3,578
  - Density: 87.16/km^{2} (225.7/sq mi)
- Demonym: Scernesi
- Time zone: UTC+1 (CET)
  - Summer (DST): UTC+2 (CEST)
- Postal code: 66020
- Dialing code: 0873
- ISTAT code: 069087
- Patron saint: San Panfilo
- Saint day: 28 April
- Website: Official website

Scerni (Abruzzese: Scìrne) is a town of 3,645 inhabitants of the province of Chieti is part of the Middle Vastese. Total area is 41 square kilometres (16 mi^{2}), and population density is 89 inhab/km^{2}. The county has borders with Atessa, Gissi, Monteodorisio and Pollutri.

Scerni was once part of the Kingdom of Two Sicilies.

== Climate ==
Based on data from the years 1961 to 1990, the average temperature of the coolest month January, is about 6 °C (43 °F), and that of the warmest month August, is about 24 °C (75 °F).

Climate data for Scerni, elevation 287 m (942 ft), (1951–2000)
Month	Jan	Feb	Mar	Apr	May	Jun	Jul	Aug	Sep	Oct	Nov	Dec	Year
Record high °C (°F)	22.0 (71.6)	23.9 (75.0)	28.8 (83.8)	29.7 (85.5)	33.5 (92.3)	39.0 (102.2)	40.1 (104.2)	39.9 (103.8)	37.2 (99.0)	31.3 (88.3)	27.5 (81.5)	22.2 (72.0)	40.1 (104.2)
Mean daily maximum °C (°F)	9.7 (49.5)	10.8 (51.4)	13.4 (56.1)	17.1 (62.8)	21.8 (71.2)	26.0 (78.8)	28.8 (83.8)	28.7 (83.7)	24.9 (76.8)	19.8 (67.6)	14.7 (58.5)	11.1 (52.0)	18.9 (66.0)
Daily mean °C (°F)	6.9 (44.4)	7.6 (45.7)	9.8 (49.6)	13.1 (55.6)	17.5 (63.5)	21.4 (70.5)	24.1 (75.4)	24.1 (75.4)	20.7 (69.3)	16.2 (61.2)	11.7 (53.1)	8.3 (46.9)	15.1 (59.2)
Mean daily minimum °C (°F)	4.2 (39.6)	4.4 (39.9)	6.3 (43.3)	9.1 (48.4)	13.2 (55.8)	16.9 (62.4)	19.5 (67.1)	19.4 (66.9)	16.5 (61.7)	12.6 (54.7)	8.7 (47.7)	5.6 (42.1)	11.4 (52.5)
Record low °C (°F)	−7.1 (19.2)	−7.9 (17.8)	−5.1 (22.8)	−1.6 (29.1)	3.1 (37.6)	8.7 (47.7)	10.0 (50.0)	10.6 (51.1)	5.5 (41.9)	0.8 (33.4)	−5.0 (23.0)	−7.6 (18.3)	−7.9 (17.8)
Average precipitation mm (inches)	72.7 (2.86)	58.9 (2.32)	66.4 (2.61)	60.8 (2.39)	43.4 (1.71)	40.0 (1.57)	35.4 (1.39)	48.2 (1.90)	64.2 (2.53)	80.7 (3.18)	92.1 (3.63)	90.5 (3.56)	753.3 (29.65)
Average precipitation days	7.5	6.8	7.2	6.2	5.6	4.7	3.5	4.4	5.4	6.9	8.3	8.8	75.3
Source: Regione Abruzzo

== Description ==
The town is attractive, amid gentle hills and with a mild climate. It is distinguished by the production of olive oil, wine and sausages (the speciality is the Ventricina variety).

== History ==
The origins of Scerni are lost in the mists of time. The only certainty is that the site where the village stands now was inhabited in prehistoric and ancient Roman times. In the medieval ages, several castles and fortifications were built in and around the city.

At the time of the French Revolution, the Baron De Riseis sided with the people of the country with Giuseppe Proni from Introdacqua, former cleric of the Marquis of Vasto, against the invasion of the Jacobins

On 25, 26 and 27 February 1860 more than a thousand peasants armed with clubs and halberds invaded the estate of the Marquis D'Avalos, destroying a rural house, stealing firewood and beating up the forest guards. The peasant fury and its numerical superiority defeated the police and the urban guards of Pollutri and Monteodorisio. It was a real uproar led with firearms in hand, led by Michelangelo Tarquinio, Giuseppe "Passaguai" Menna and Luigi Berarducci.

== Places ==
The patron saint of Scerni is San Panfilo (Saint Pamphilus of Sulmona). There is a church consecrated to him. Other attractions are the Palazzo De Riseis.

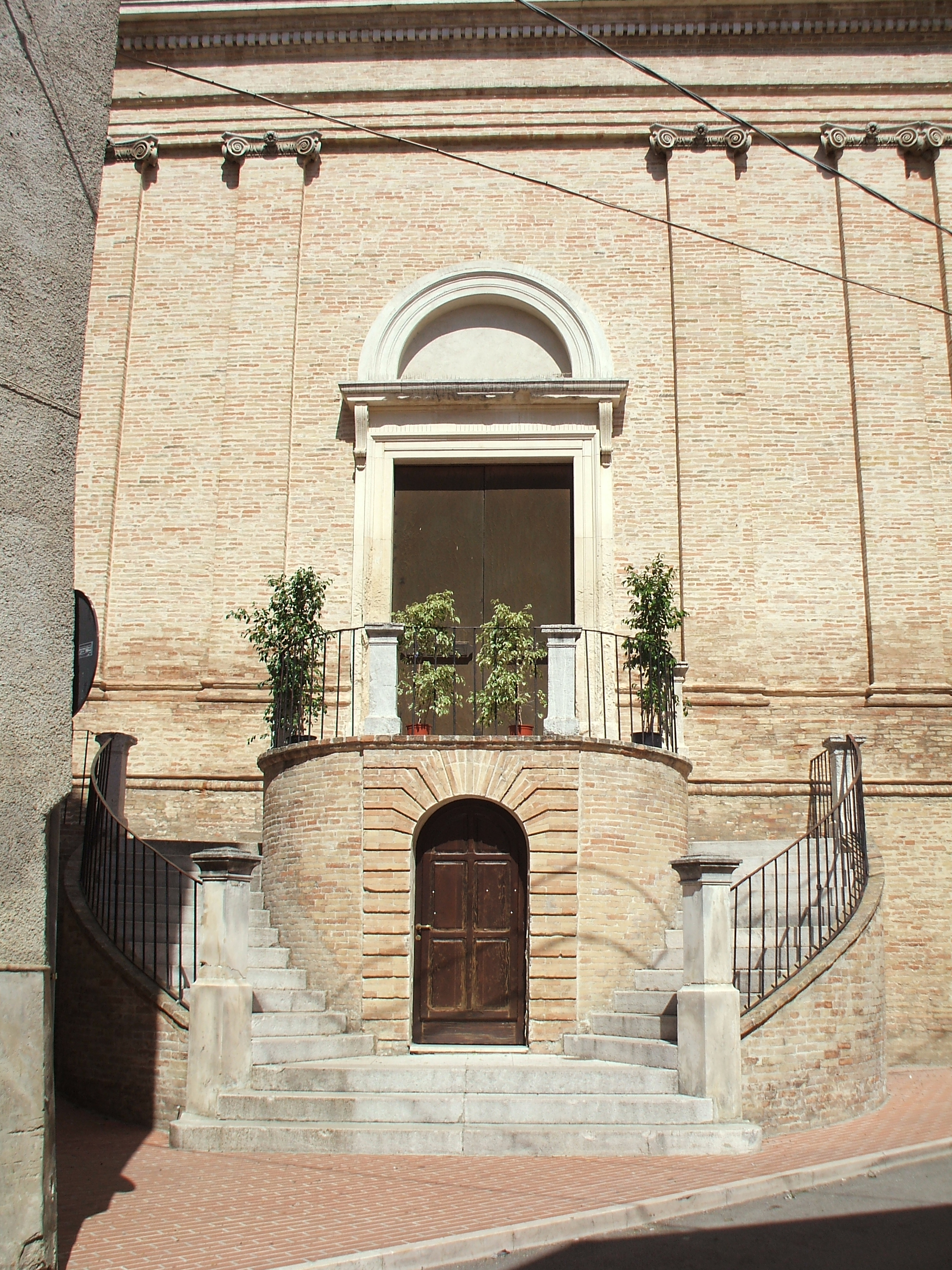
Lateral facade of the Church of San Panfilo, Scerni, Italy

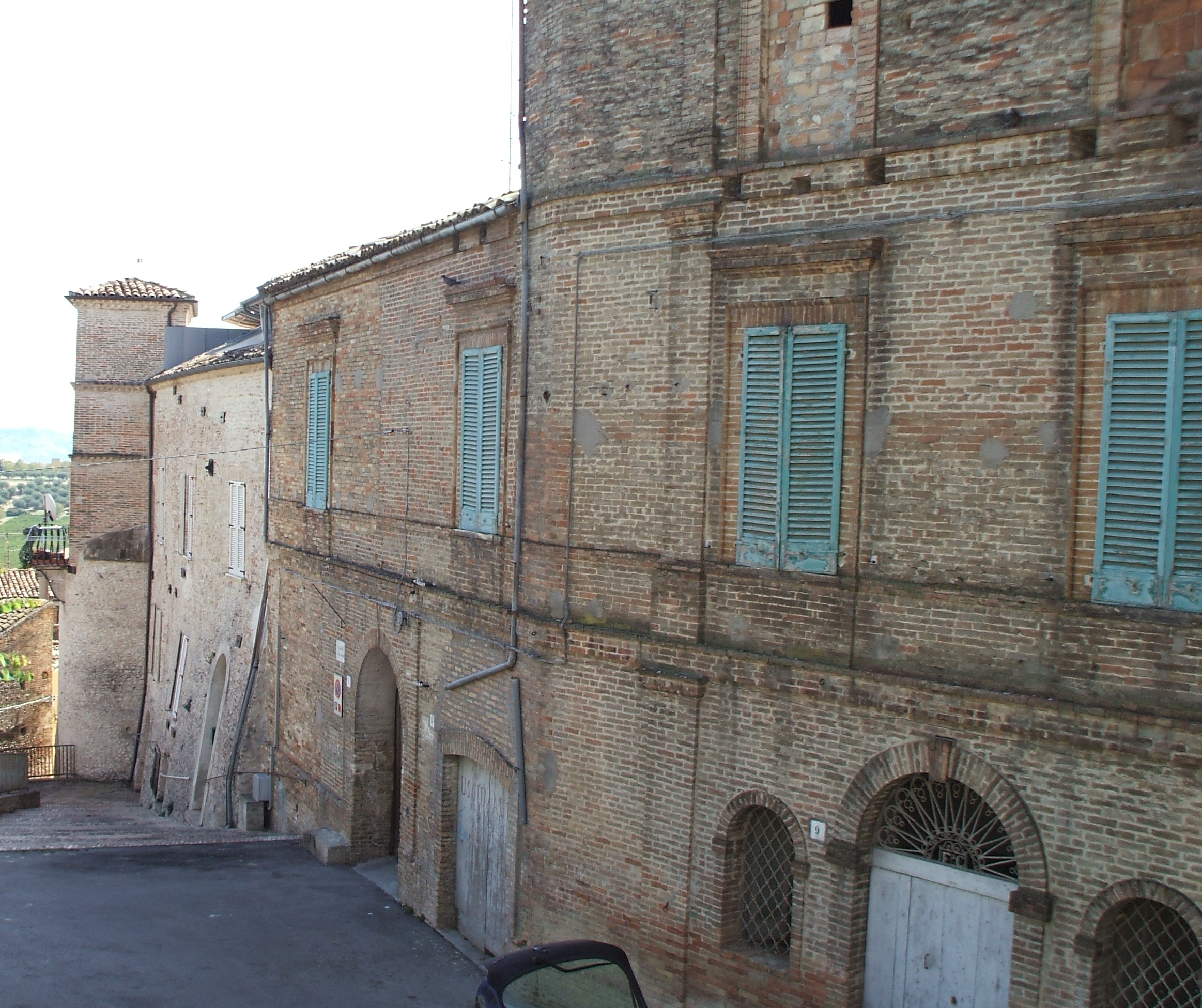
Palazzo De Riseis, Scerni, Italy

== Distinguished citizens ==
- Giuseppe De Riseis, (Scerni, Chieti, 1833 - Rome, 1924), politician.
- Leonardo Umile (Scerni, 1919 - to Bastia Nardi Licciana, 1944) partisan.

== See also ==
- Abruzzo (wine)
- Chieti (province)
- Ventricina (food)
