= Scerni (disambiguation) =

Scerni may refer to:

- Scerni, a town and municipality of the province of Chieti, Italy
- Fred Scerni (born 1948), American politician
- Gianni Scerni, former chairman of Genoa C.F.C.
