= Pietro Antonio Corsignani =

Italian bishop, writer, and historian

Pietro Antonio Corsignani (13 January 1688 - 17 October 1751) was an Italian bishop, writer, and historian of the Abruzzo.

== Biography ==
Born in Celano, he studied law in Rome. In 1711, he was ordained a priest. In Rome, he was a member of the Pontifical Academy of Arcadia, but would also be invited to be honorary member of other erudite academies. During the papacy of Benedict XIII in 1727, he was named bishop of Venosa, and in July 1738, bishop of Valva and Sulmona.

== Works ==
Among his literary works are:

- Avvertimenti politici e morali & c. Rome 1708 in 8°.
- De viris illustribus Marsorum (Of Illustrious Men of Ancient Abruzzo), Rome 1712 in 4° (Latin text).
- De Aniene, ac Viæ Valeriæ pontibus Synoptica enarratio &c. Rome 1718 in 4°.
- Epistola istorica sopra varie Marsicane notizie, Velletri 1722 in 4°.
- Synodus dioecesana , Rome 178 in 4 (Latin text).
- Regia Marsicana, Naples 1748 t. 2 in 4°.
- Acta Ss. MM. Simplicii, Constantii & Victoriani &c., Rome 1750 in 4°.
- Vita della Marchesana Petronilla Massimi.
- Vita del Cardinal Melchiorre di Polignac
