= Castello di Monteodorisio =

Castle in Monteodorisio, Italy

Coordinates: 42.0862°N 14.6508°E

Castle of Monteodorisio
- Castello di Monteodorisio
- Monteodorisio
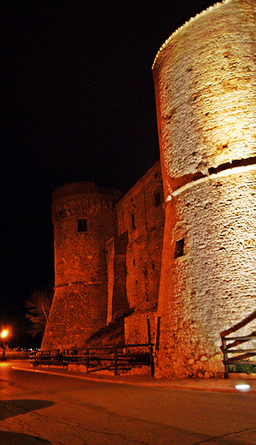
- Castle in Monteodorisio

Site information
- Type: Castle

Location

Site history
- Built: 13th century

Castello di Monteodorisio (Italian for Castle of Monteodorisio) is a Middle Ages castle in Monteodorisio, Province of Chieti (Abruzzo).

== History ==
The Castle of Monteodorisio is a medieval fortification dating back to the 11th century, likely built by the Normans, as it appears in a deed of gift from Count Robert of Loritello to Bishop Rainolfo of Chieti in 1095. This deed included the castle and the two churches associated with it: San Salvatore within the castle and San Pietro outside it, both given in perpetuity to the Diocese of Chieti. The castle later belonged to various families, including the Del Borgo, the D'Artus, the Barrile, the Caldora, and the D'Avalos. It is located in the eponymous town in the Province of Chieti.

== Architecture ==
The castle is situated at the highest point of the town, on the western edge of the hill, which descends steeply towards the Sinello River, providing a clear view over the entire valley below for spotting enemies and allowing for a possible escape.

Of its original rectangular shape, only the southwest curtain, used as a residence, the northwest curtain, consisting of a high wall, and three of the four towers oriented to the cardinal points, remain. Archival sources suggest that the degradation of the castle began with the devastations brought by the Conspiracy of the Barons (1485) by the papal troops, leading to the definitive disappearance of two sides and the fourth tower in the first half of the 19th century. In the early 20th century, the courtyard was leveled to the adjacent square to accommodate a school building (1925), erected on the area of the original curtains.

The castle is constructed with river cobblestones, whole or worked, from the Sinello River, mixed with clay, visible mainly in the structure of the towers. The towers have a circular base with sloped walls and windows. The northern part consists of walls four meters thick, 14 meters high, with openings for cannons splayed. At the top of this facade, there is a large window with a round arch. This part, along with the towers, is the oldest. The four loopholes were served by a walking level. The main building is more recent. The walls show some reinforcement interventions from the 15th century and others, more recent, from 1960. The west tower has a crown of machicolations without murder holes, purely ornamental, above which there is a frieze with interlaced arches, and above that, a frieze with ovules. The northern tower, below the redondone, situated between the batter and the vertical level, features an architectural motif of bricks arranged in a herringbone pattern.

The castle houses the Museum of Economy from Antiquity to the Renaissance. Since 2012, it also hosts the Museum of Archaeology of the Vastese, which was previously located in the convent of Sant'Antonio in San Buono. It preserves archaeological finds from the municipalities in the Vastese hinterland, between the Trigno and Sinello rivers.

Close to the south tower, a water cistern has been built, whose height and shape significantly influence the overall view of the castle.
