= Crescenzio Sepe =

Cardinal and Archbishop of Naples

His Eminence Crescenzio Sepe
- Cardinal, Archbishop emeritus of Naples
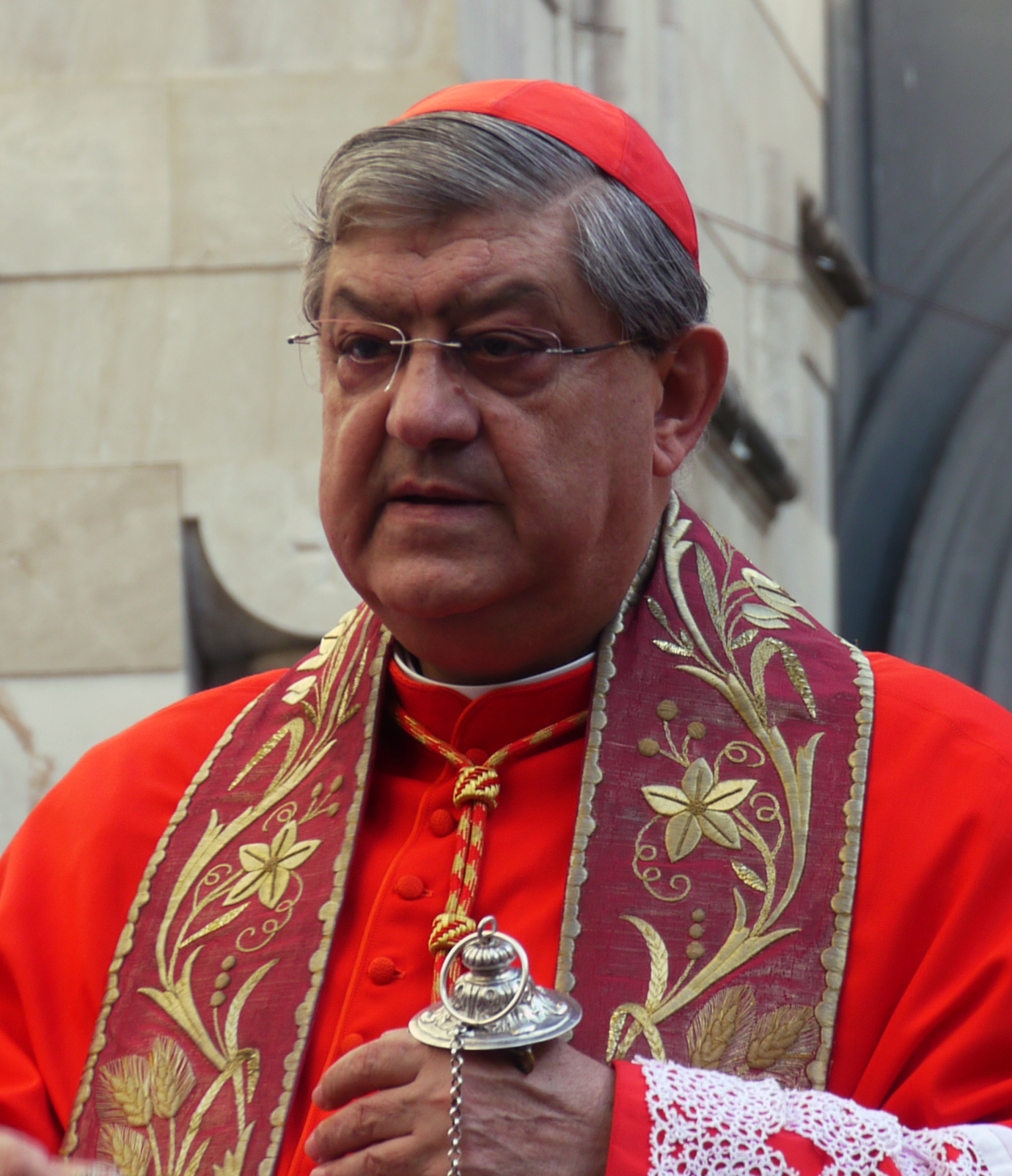
- Archdiocese: Naples
- See: Naples
- Installed: 1 July 2006
- Term ended: 12 December 2020
- Predecessor: Michele Giordano
- Successor: Domenico Battaglia
- Other post: Cardinal-Priest of Dio Padre misericordioso
- Previous posts: Titular Archbishop of Gradum (1992–2001); Secretary of the Congregation for the Clergy (1992–2001); Cardinal-Deacon of Dio Padre misericordioso (2001–2006); Prefect of the Congregation for the Evangelization of Peoples (2001–2006)

Orders
- Ordination: 12 March 1967 by Antonio Cece
- Consecration: 26 April 1992 by Pope John Paul II
- Created cardinal: 21 February 2001 by Pope John Paul II
- Rank: Cardinal Priest

Personal details
- Born: Crescenzio Sepe; 2 June 1943 (age 83) Carinaro, Caserta, Kingdom of Italy
- Denomination: Roman Catholic
- Motto: In nomine Domini (In the name of the Lord)
- Coat of arms: Crescenzio Sepe's coat of arms

Styles of Crescenzio Sepe
- Reference style: His Eminence
- Spoken style: Your Eminence
- Informal style: Cardinal
- See: Naples

Ordination history of Crescenzio Sepe
History
Priestly ordination
- Ordained by: Antonio Cece
- Date: 12 March 1967
- Place: Aversa, Italy
Episcopal consecration
- Principal consecrator: Pope John Paul II
- Co-consecrators: Franciszek Macharski; Angelo Sodano
- Date: 26 April 1992
- Place: St. Peter's Basilica
Cardinalate
- Elevated by: Pope John Paul II
- Date: 21 February 2001
Episcopal succession
Bishops consecrated by Crescenzio Sepe as principal consecrator
- Wenceslao Selga Padilla: 2003
- Paul Hinder: 2004
- Joseph Prathan Sridarunsil: 2004
- Francesco Marino: 2005
- Rafael Sandoval Sandoval: 2005
- Henryk Franciszek Hoser: 2005
- Camillo Ballin: 2005
- Antonio Di Donna: 2007
- Lucio Lemmo: 2010
- Ciro Miniero: 2011
- Antonio De Luca: 2012
- Pasquale Cascio: 2013
- Pietro Lagnese: 2013
- Orazio Francesco Piazza: 2013
- Gennaro Acampa: 2014
- Salvatore Angerami: 2014
- Michele Fusco: 2018
- Giuseppe Mazzafaro: 2021

Crescenzio Sepe (Italian pronunciation: [kreʃˈʃɛntsjo ˈsɛːpe]; born 2 June 1943) is an Italian prelate of the Catholic Church who served as Archbishop of Naples from 2006 to 2020. He served in the Roman Curia as Prefect of the Congregation for the Evangelization of Peoples from 2001 to 2006. He was made a cardinal in 2001. Before that he spent 25 years in increasingly important positions in the Roman Curia.

== Biography ==
=== Early life and ordination ===
Born at Carinaro, in the province of Caserta. He attended the Seminary of Aversa, studied philosophy at the Regional Seminary in Salerno and theology in Rome. He was ordained for the Diocese of Aversa on 12 March 1967. He earned degrees in theology and canon law at the Pontifical Lateran University and in philosophy from the University of Rome La Sapienza. He taught theology at the Lateran and Urbanian Pontifical Universities. To prepare for a career in the diplomatic service of the Holy See, he entered the Pontifical Ecclesiastical Academy in 1969.

=== Career in the Curia ===
He joined the diplomatic service of the Holy See and was posted to Brazil from 1972 to 1975. He then returned to Rome and worked at the Secretariat of State, first in the Section for International Organizations and then in office for information and documentation. He was named the Secretariat's Assessor for General Affairs in 1987.

Sepe was appointed Secretary of the Congregation for the Clergy and Titular Archbishop of Gradum on 2 April 1992. He received his episcopal consecration from Pope John Paul II on 26 April. On 29 September 1992, Pope John Paul named him a member of the Pontifical Council for the Pastoral Care of Migrants and Itinerant People. In an essay published the next year, he described celibacy as integral to the priesthood: "Christ willed ... to combine the virginal state with his mission as eternal priest.... We can therefore affirm that chastity and virginity are not simply additional or secondary in Christ's priestly existence, but belong to its very essence."

As secretary of the Congregation for the Clergy, Sepe was responsible for organizing the celebration marking the 50th anniversary of Pope John Paul's ordination to the priesthood, which proved so successful that the Pope gave him even greater responsibility. On 3 November 1997, Pope John Paul named him General Secretary of the Central Committee for the Great Jubilee of the Year 2000, which has been described as "almost certainly the most complex logistical enterprise in recent Roman memory" and "a carnival such as Rome has not seen since the days of Nero". He was President of Peregrinatio ad Petri Sedem from 8 November 1997 to July 2001. On 18 February 1999, he was made a member of the Congregation for the Clergy.

On 9 April 2001 Pope John Paul named him Prefect of the Congregation for the Evangelization of Peoples. As Prefect he was ex officio the Grand Chancellor of the Pontifical Urban University. In 1995, as head of the Congregation, he helped implement a priest-sharing program among dioceses worldwide to help redress the geographical imbalance in vocations. He also said that the Vatican was facilitating the return of hundreds of priests who had left the active ministry and married in civil ceremonies, but who were now divorced or widowed and were "sincerely sorry" for having strayed from their vocation. In 1997 he said a relaxing of the celibacy rule for Latin Church priests would not ease the vocations crisis and would have no theological or pastoral foundation.

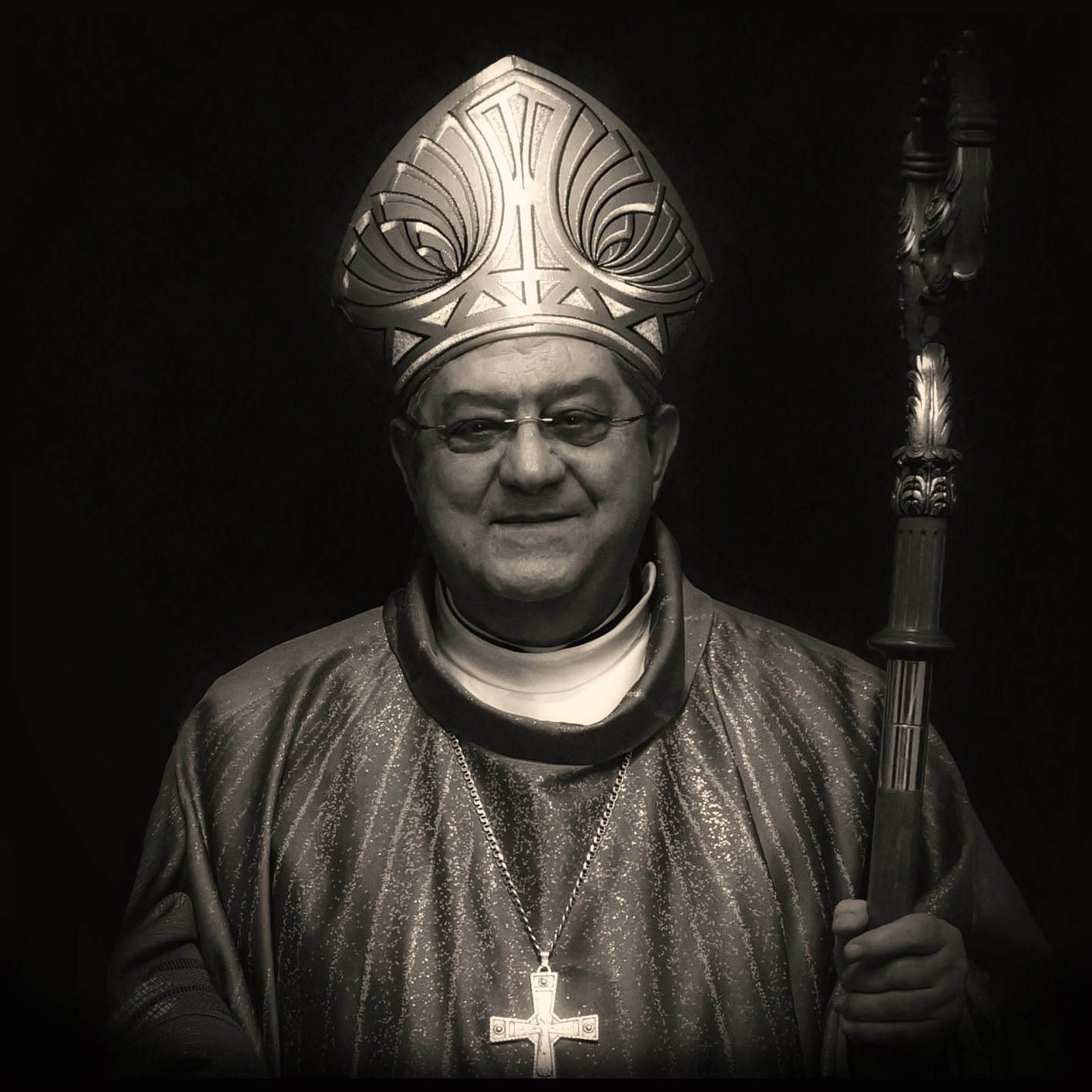
Crescenzio Sepe in 2017, photographed by Augusto De Luca

Pope John Paul made him Cardinal-Deacon of Dio Padre misericordioso in the consistory of 21 February 2001. At the age of 57, he was the youngest official of the Roman Curia named a cardinal in decades. He participated as a cardinal elector in the 2005 conclave that elected Pope Benedict XVI, where he was also one of the cardinals named to the group that handles the ordinary affairs of the Apostolic See until a new pope is chosen, and in the 2013 conclave that elected Pope Francis.

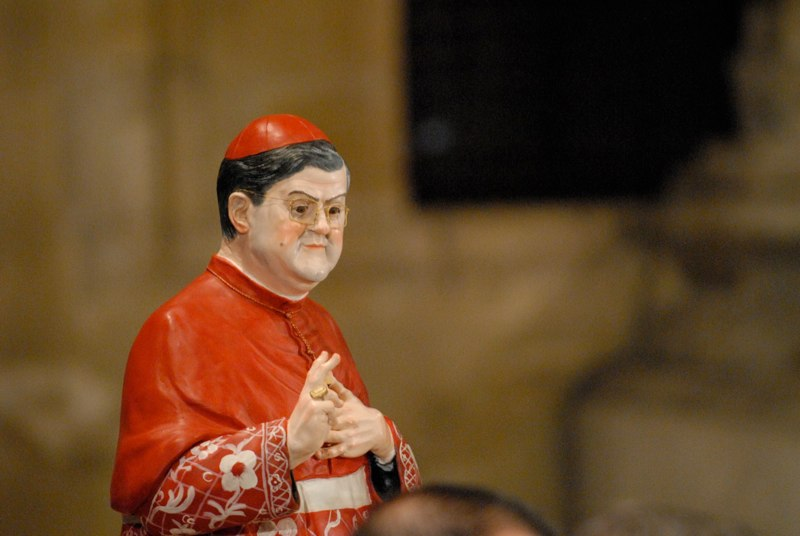
A statue of Sepe in the Church of S. Chiara, Naples

Pope John Paul named him a member of the Pontifical Commission for Latin America on 6 August 2002, the Congregation for the Doctrine of the Faith on 6 September 2002, the Pontifical Council for Promoting Christian Unity on 8 November 2002, the Special Council for Asia of the General Secretariat of the Synod of Bishops on 28 May 2004, and the Pontifical Council for Legislative Texts on 20 November 2004.

=== Archbishop of Naples ===
On 20 May 2006, he was appointed Archbishop of Naples. With that appointment, he became a Cardinal-Priest with his deaconry elevated pro hac vice to title. He was the first head of a Roman dicastery in decades to be given a diocesan appointment. (Note: In a similar way, Pope Benedict moved Archbishop Malcolm Ranjith from his position as Secretary of the Congregation for Divine Worship and the Discipline of the Sacraments to head the Archdiocese of Colombo in 2009.) He disputed the idea that his reassignment to Naples from the Roman Curia represented a demotion. Sepe said that when Benedict asked for his reaction in advance, he agreed because it was how he wanted to end his career. Others thought Pope Benedict preferred to have a prelate from a traditional missionary country, in this instance Indian Cardinal Ivan Dias, lead the Congregation responsible for missionary work. (Note: Pope Francis made a similar change in 2019, replacing the Italian Cardinal Fernando Filoni with the Philippine Cardinal Luis Tagle.)

In 2007 he called for an end to gang violence.

In June 2010, Sepe was under investigation by Perugia's public prosecutor's office for financial corruption in connection with the renovation and sale of some of the Congregation's properties. Media reports alleged that during his time as prefect, he sold property owned by the Congregation at discounted prices to politicians positioned to help the Congregation. Sepe said that he has "nothing to hide" and he was expected to waive the diplomatic immunity afforded by his Vatican passport and meet investigators.

In March 2018 Sepe forwarded to the Vatican a 1,200-page dossier compiled by Francesco Mangiacapra, a male escort, that purported to identify 40 actively gay Catholic priests. He said: "those who have erred must pay the price, and be helped to repent for the harm done".

He has been a member of the Pontifical Council for Social Communications and the Pontifical Council for Interreligious Dialogue.

He formally retired as Archbishop of Naples in 12 December 2020, with the appointment of his successor, Domenico Battaglia, at the time Bishop of Diocese of Cerreto Sannita–Telese–Sant’Agata de’ Goti.

== Notes ==
Catholic Church titles
Preceded by Giovanni Battista Re	Assessor for General Affairs of the Secretariat of State; 10 October 1987 – 2 April 1992	Succeeded by Leonardo Sandri
Preceded by Gilberto Agustoni	Secretary of the Commission of Cardinals for the Pontifical Shrines; 1992 – 1996	Office abolished
Preceded by Gilberto Agustoni	Secretary of the Congregation for the Clergy; 2 April 1992 – 3 November 1997	Succeeded by Csaba Ternyák
Preceded by José López Ortiz	— TITULAR — Titular Archbishop of Gradum; 2 April 1992 – 21 February 2001	Succeeded by Diego Causero
Preceded by Sergio Sebastiani	Committee for the Great Jubilee; 3 November 1997 – 2001	Office abolished
Preceded by Sergio Sebastiani	President of the Peregrinatio ad Pedri Sedem; 8 November 1997 – 25 July 2001	Succeeded by Francesco Gioia
New title	Cardinal Deacon of Dio Padre misericordioso 21 February 2001 – 20 May 2006	Diaconate promoted to titular church
Preceded by Jozef Tomko	Prefect of the Congregation for the Evangelization of Peoples; 9 April 2001 – 20 May 2006	Succeeded by Ivan Dias
Preceded by Jozef Tomko	President of the Interdicasterial Commission for Consecrated Religious; 9 April 2001 – 20 May 2006	Succeeded by Ivan Dias
Preceded by Michele Giordano	Archbishop of Naples; 20 May 2006 –12 December 2020	Succeeded by Domenico Battaglia
Diaconate elevated to titular church	Cardinal Priest 'pro hac vice' of Dio Padre misericordioso 20 May 2006 –	Incumbent
