= Edoardo Menichelli =

Italian Catholic prelate (1939–2025)

His Eminence Edoardo Menichelli
- Cardinal; Archbishop Emeritus Ancona-Osimo
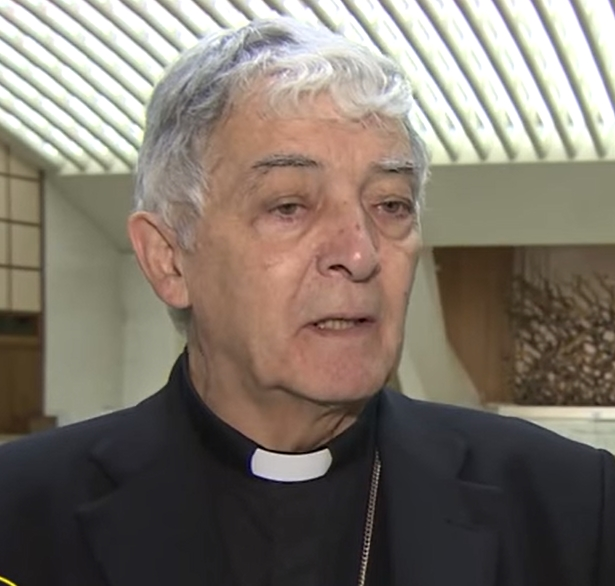
- Menichelli in 2015
- Archdiocese: Ancona-Osimo
- See: Ancona-Osimo
- Appointed: 8 January 2004
- Installed: 7 March 2004
- Term ended: 14 July 2017
- Predecessor: Franco Festorazzi
- Successor: Angelo Spina
- Other post: Cardinal-Priest of Sacri Cuori di Gesù e Maria a Tor Fiorenza (2015–2025)
- Previous post: Archbishop of Chieti-Vasto (1994–2004)

Orders
- Ordination: 3 July 1965
- Consecration: 9 July 1994 by Achille Silvestrini
- Created cardinal: 14 February 2015 by Pope Francis
- Rank: Cardinal-Priest

Personal details
- Born: Edoardo Menichelli; 14 October 1939 Serripola, San Severino Marche, Macerata, Italy
- Died: 20 October 2025 (aged 86) San Severino Marche, Italy
- Motto: Sub lumine Matris (In the light of the Mother)
- Coat of arms: Edoardo Menichelli's coat of arms

Ordination history of Edoardo Menichelli
History
Episcopal consecration
- Principal consecrator: Achille Silvestrini
- Co-consecrators: Antonio Valentini Piergiorgio Silvano Nesti
Cardinalate
- Elevated by: Pope Francis
Episcopal succession
Bishops consecrated by Edoardo Menichelli as principal consecrator
- Stefano Russo: 28 May 2016

Styles of Edoardo Menichelli
- Reference style: His Eminence
- Spoken style: Your Eminence
- Religious style: Cardinal
- Informal style: Cardinal

Edoardo Menichelli (14 October 1939 – 20 October 2025) was an Italian prelate of the Catholic Church. He served as archbishop of the Archdiocese of Ancona-Osimo from 2004 to 2017. Pope Francis made him a cardinal on 14 February 2015.

== Life and career ==
=== Early life ===
Edoardo Menichelli was born in Serripola in San Severino Marche in the province of Macerata and the Diocese of San Severino Marche on 14 October 1939. He studied theology and philosophy at the San Severino Marche and Fano seminaries and then at the Pontifical Lateran University in Rome, where he obtained a licentiate in pastoral theology.

=== Priesthood ===
On 3 July 1965 he was ordained a priest of the Diocese of San Severino Marche. He then became assistant pastor at the parish of St. Joseph in San Severino Marche and taught religion in state schools. In 1986, with the unification of the Diocese of San Severino Marche with the Archdiocese of Camerino, he was assigned to the new Archdiocese of Camerino-San Severino Marche.

From 1968 to 1991 he served in the Roman Curia at the Apostolic Signatura, then from 1992 to 1994 at the secretariat for the Congregation for the Oriental Churches, where he met the Cardinal Achille Silvestrini and became his secretary.

== Episcopate ==
On 10 June 1994 he was appointed by Pope John Paul II as Archbishop of Chieti-Vasto. He was consecrated as a bishop on 9 July in Rome by Cardinal Silvestrini, with archbishops Antony Valentini and Piergiorgio Nesti as co-consecrators. He spent ten years in Chieti. On 8 January 2004, Pope John Paul II appointed him Archbishop of Ancona-Osimo, and he took possession of the archdiocese on 7 March. He was secretary of the committee for the family of the Italian Episcopal Conference and headed committees for the family, ecumenism and the pastoral care of leisure for the Marche bishops' conference.

On 15 October 2014, on reaching his 75th birthday, he submitted his resignation as required by canon law, but Pope Francis extended the appointment for one year.

== Cardinal ==
On 4 January 2015, Pope Francis announced Menichelli would be made a cardinal at a consistory on 14 February. He was assigned the titular church of Sacri Cuori di Gesù e Maria a Tor Fiorenza.

He was appointed a member of the Congregation for the Oriental Churches and of the Pontifical Council for the Pastoral Care of Health Care Workers.

Pope Francis accepted his resignation as archbishop on 14 July 2017, with Angelo Spina succeeding him as archbishop of Ancona-Osimo.

On 30 September 2017 Francis named him a member of the Supreme Tribunal of the Apostolic Signatura.

Menichelli died in San Severino Marche after a long illness on 20 October 2025, at the age of 86.

== See also ==
- Cardinals created by Pope Francis

Catholic Church titles
Preceded by Antonio Valentini	Archbishop of Chieti-Vasto; 1994–2004	Succeeded by Bruno Forte
Preceded by Franco Festorazzi	Archbishop of Ancona-Osimo; 2004–2017	Succeeded by Angelo Spina
New title Titular church established	Cardinal Priest of Sacri Cuori di Gesù e Maria a Tor Fiorenza; 2015–2025	Vacant
