= Pompeo Zambeccari =

- Archbishop of Sulmona
- Church: Catholic Church
- See: Valva and Sulmona
- Appointed: 1 July 1547
- Term ended: 8 August 1571
- Predecessor: Bernardino Fumarelli
- Successor: Vincenzo de Doncelli
- Other post: Apostolic Nuncio to Portugal

Orders
- Consecration: 3 April 1548 (Bishop) by Card. Giovanni Morone

Personal details
- Born: 1518 Bologna
- Died: 8 August 1571 (aged 52–53) L'Aquila
- Buried: Abbey of Santo Spirito d'Ocre

Pompeo Zambeccari (1518–1571) was Apostolic Nuncio to Portugal from 1550 to 1553, and served also as Bishop of Valva and Sulmona from 1547 to 1571.

== Life ==
Pompeo Zambeccari was born in Bologna in 1518. He was given the tonsure (and so entered in the clergy) at the age of 12; and, supported by the Colonna family, in 1531 he was granted the incomes of the Abbey of Santo Spirito d'Ocre and later of the Abbey of Santa Maria di Bominaco. On 24 October 1541 he completed his studies earning a doctorate in utroque iure at the University of Bologna, and he moved to Rome.

In Rome, Zambeccari undertook doctorate studies in Law at the Archiginnasio Romano (as it was called at the time La Sapienza University). He joined the Accademia Romana, where he met and was estimated by the humanists of the town. In the meantime he entered in the service of Cardinal Alessandro Farnese, nephew of Pope Paul III, and because of that connection he was appointed deputy of the Farfa Abbey and commander of the church of Santo Spirito in Sassia in Rome.

On 20 June 1536 he was appointed Protonotary apostolic. On 1 July 1547 he was appointed Bishop of Valva and Sulmona. The episcopal consecration followed on 3 April 1548 in the church of the Monastery of the Holy Spirit in Bologna by the hands of Cardinal Giovanni Morone.

In March 1550 Pompeo Zambeccari was appointed by Pope Julius III the new Apostolic Nuncio to Portugal, probably without having received detailed instructions. All his nunciature was marked by the lack of a true interest of Rome for the affairs of Portugal. In Portugal Pompeo was interested in the process of beatification of Gonçalo de Amarante. In spring 1552 Pompeo had meetings with king John III of Portugal in order to apply in Portugal the decrees of the Council of Trent. In 1553, the pope sent Giovanni Francesco Mazza di Canobio to offer the title of Apostolic legate of Portugal to Cardinal Henry of Portugal, the brother of the king. Pompeo Zambeccari therefore left the Portugal on 25 November 1553, and on 16 September 1554 he returned to his diocese in Sulmona.

In the following years, Pompeo lived for long periods in Rome, despite the requirement issued by the Council of Trent that bishop should live in his diocese. In Rome Pompeo renovated his family palace nearby the Basilica of the Santi Apostoli; the renovation was so impressive that in January 1554 Pope Julius III blamed him because Pompeo's palace was even more majestic than the ones of the most important Cardinals.

Pompeo Zambeccari arrived in Trento on 17 January 1562 to attend the last session of the Council of Trent. He later returned to Sulmona where he renovated the Episcopal Palace. He had an illegitimate son, named Lepido.

He died in l'Aquila on 8 August 1571 and was buried in his Abbey of Santo Spirito d'Ocre, notwithstanding he had prepared for himself a tomb in his family chapel in Basilica of the Santi Apostoli in Rome.
