= Petronilla Paolini Massimi =

Italian poet (1663–1726)

- Marchioness
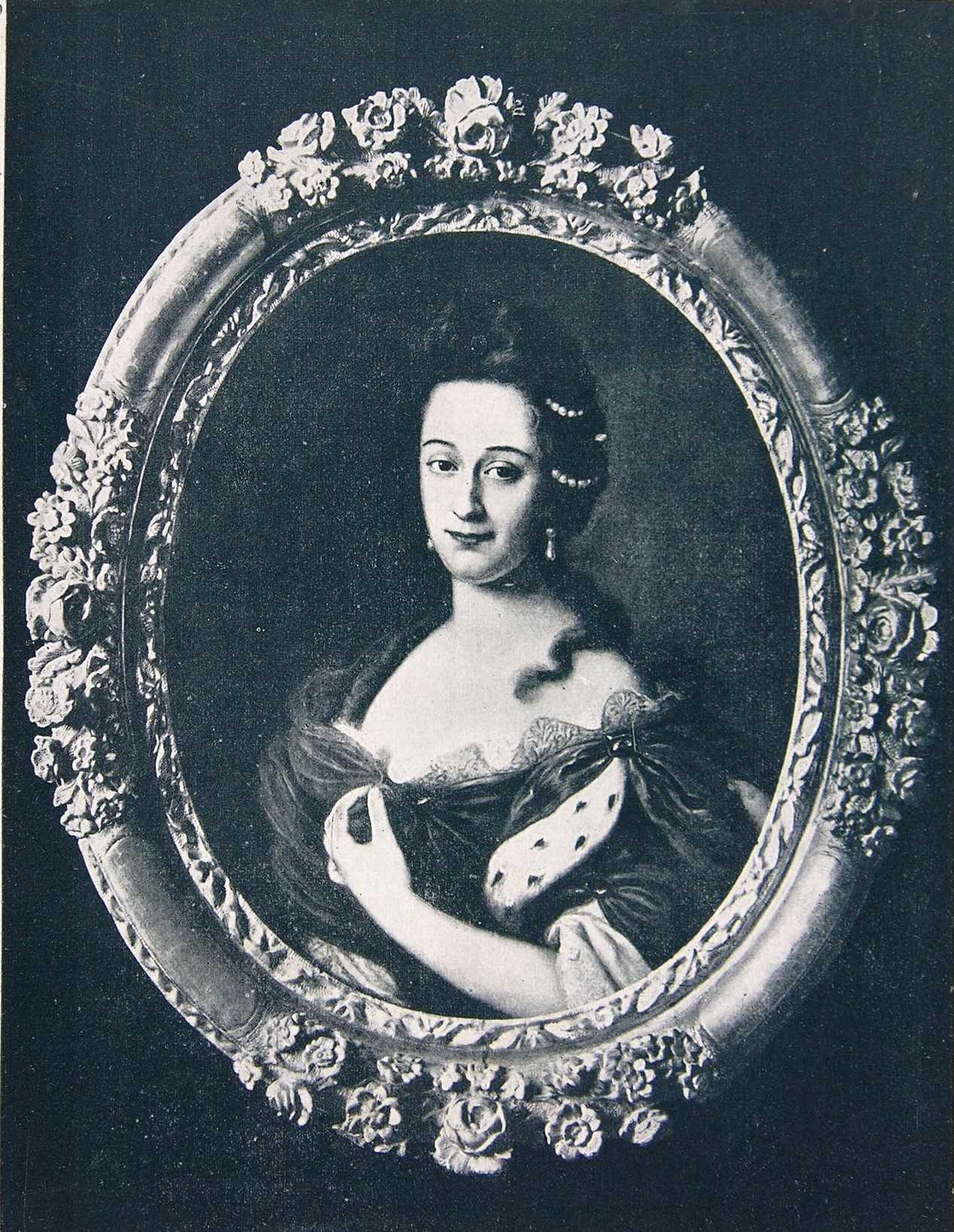
- Marchesa Petronilla Paolini-Massimi
- Born: 24 December 1663; Tagliacozzo, Abruzzo
- Died: 3 March 1726 (aged 62); Rome, Papal States
- Noble family: Paolini family (by birth); Massimo family (by marriage)
- Spouse: Marquis Francesco Massimi (m. 1673; died 1709)
- Father: Baron Francesco Paolini
- Mother: Silvia Argoli

Marchioness Petronilla Paolini Massimi (née Paolini; 1663–1726), also known by the Arcadian pseudonym Fidalma Partenide, (Note: Pet-ro-KNEE-la Pay-o-LEE-nee Mah-SEEmee; Fee-DAHL-ma Pahr-tuh-NEE-dee.) was an Italian poet and writer. Her difficult life is recorded in her autobiographical poems. She was an admired member of the Arcadian Academy, whose work is noted today for its strong defense of women and anticipation of gender studies.

== Life ==
=== Early life ===
Petronilla Paolini was born in Tagliacozzo, Abruzzo, on 24 December 1663, the daughter of Baron Francesco Paolini of Marsica and Silvia Argoli. Her father, Baron of Ortona dei Marsi and Gentleman of the Colonna, was considered to be a highly cultured and successful politician, her mother "thoughtful, introvert and lover of solitude."

When Petronilla was four years old, her father was murdered in an ambush; mother and daughter then fled to Rome, taking refuge at the court of Pope Clement X. Petronilla received a good education during the time she spent at the boarding school of the Convent of the Holy Spirit.

=== Marriage ===
Clement X had Petronilla removed from the convent shortly before her tenth birthday and married to his nephew, Marquis Francesco Massimi. Massimi, at that time aged 40, was a soldier with noble rank but a reputedly callous nature, then keeper of the Castel Sant'Angelo, Rome's notorious prison.

Petronilla would later write about these events, as in her poem, "Unbind Your Angered Tresses," in which she bluntly mourned: "the strong hand of fate/Joined the fair April of my years/to alien old age."

=== Return to the Convent ===
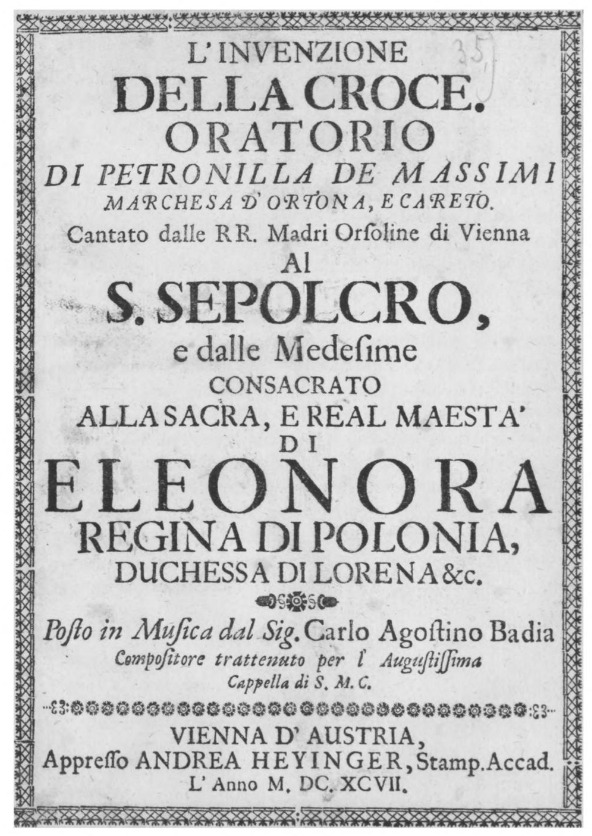
Title page of her Libretto: L'Invenzione della croce (1697)

After the death of one of her sons, Petronilla re-entered the Convent of the Holy Spirit, where she wrote the works for which she is known.

These include both the unpublished poems and writings that might be expected of a woman of this period, but also published works, including musical libretti. As early as 1696, she was collaborating with Carlo Agostino Badia, providing the texts for several of his oratorios, including the Legend of the Cross (Italian: L'Invenzione Della Croce).

== Legacy ==
She died in Rome on 3 March 1726, and was buried in the Church of St. Egidio.

In 2022, her memoir, Life of the Marchesa Petronilla Paolini Massimi described by herself (Italian, Vita della Marchesa Petronilla Paolini Massimi da sé medesima descritta li 12 agosto 1703) was published for the first time in its complete form. Pietro Antonio Corsignani wrote a posthumous biography.

== Works ==
Her writings include:

- Non disdire alla Donna gli esercizi letterari e cavallereschi (no date),
- Oratorio per la morte del Redentore (1697),
- La corona poetica rinterzata in lode di Clemente XI (1701),
- Canzoni epitalamiche (1704),
- Le Muse in gala (1704),
- I giuochi olimpici (1705),
- "Note sul Simposio di Platone", in Prose delgi Arcadi (Tome III).
