= Sulmona Cathedral =

Catholic cathedral in Sulmona, Italy

Coordinates: 42°03′14″N 13°55′14″E

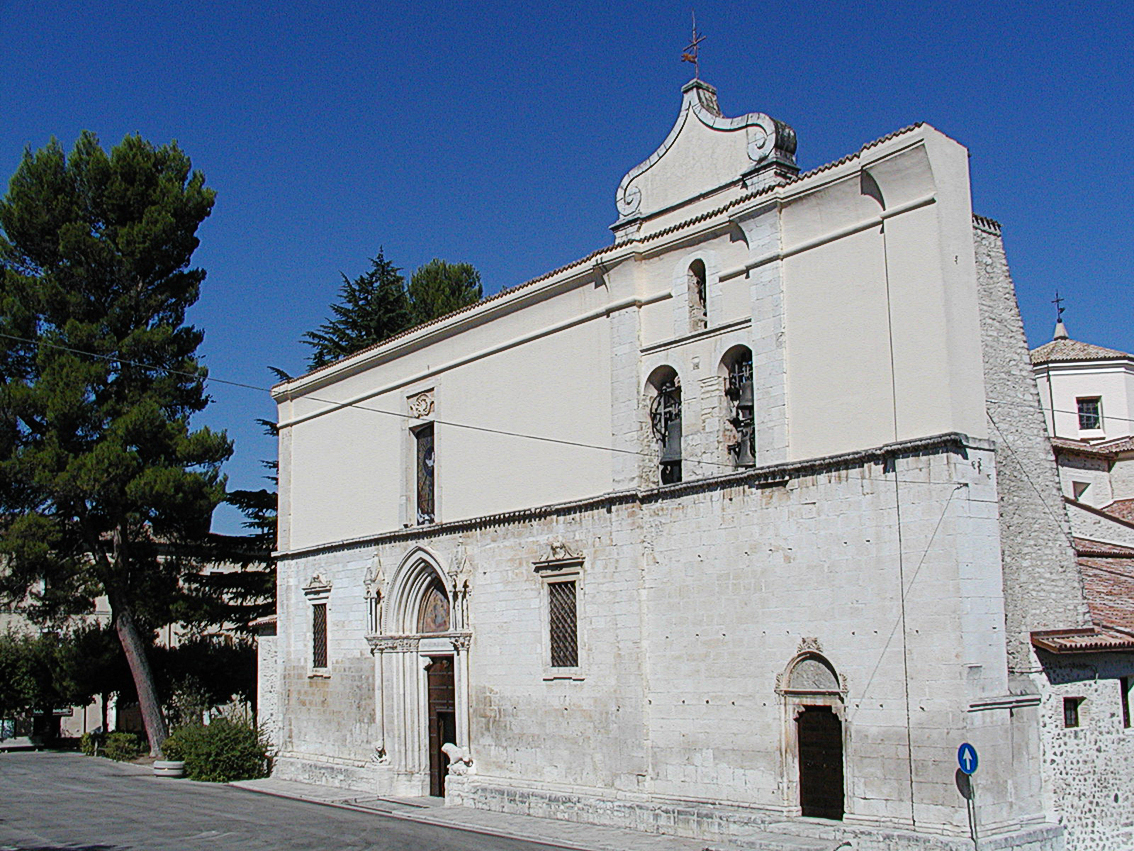
West front

Sulmona Cathedral (Italian: Duomo di Sulmona, Basilica Cattedrale di San Panfilo) is a Catholic cathedral in Sulmona, Italy, and is the seat of the Bishop of Sulmona-Valva (formerly of the Bishop of Sulmona).

== History ==
Construction of the present building, in Romanesque style, began in 1075, although the site is older - a Roman temple is believed to have stood there - and what is now visible is the result of many more recent layers of architecture applied over centuries.

The original dedication was to the Virgin Mary, but many changes took place in the 12th century, among them a change of dedication to Saint Pamphilus, the patron saint of Sulmona.

The cathedral was badly damaged in the earthquake of 1706, and rebuilt in a Baroque form, some of which can still be seen despite more recent renovations.

On 25 September 1818, Pope Pius VII granted the cathedral of S. Pamfilo in Sulmona the honorary title of "minor basilica".
