= Vincenzo de Doncelli =

The Most Reverend Vincenzo de Doncelli
- Bishop of Valva e Sulmona
- Church: Catholic Church
- Diocese: Diocese of Valva e Sulmona
- In office: 1571–1585
- Predecessor: Pompeo Zambeccari
- Successor: Francesco Carusi

Orders
- Consecration: 7 October 1571 by Scipione Rebiba

Personal details
- Died: 1585

Vincenzo de Doncelli, O.P. (died 1585) was a Roman Catholic prelate who served as Bishop of Valva e Sulmona (1571–1585).

== Biography ==
Vincenzo de Doncelli was ordained a priest in the Order of Preachers. On 24 September 1571, he was appointed during the papacy of Pope Pius V as Bishop of Valva e Sulmona. On 7 October 1571, he was consecrated bishop by Scipione Rebiba, Cardinal-Priest of Santa Maria in Trastevere, with Umberto Locati, Bishop of Bagnoregio, and Eustachio Locatelli, Bishop of Reggio Emilia, serving as co-consecrators. He served as Bishop of Valva e Sulmona until his death in 1585.

While bishop, he was the principal co-consecrator of: Vincenzo Castaneola Marino, Bishop of Alba (1573).

== External links and additional sources ==
- Cheney, David M. "Diocese of Sulmona-Valva". Catholic-Hierarchy.org. (for Chronology of Bishops) ^{[self-published]}
- Chow, Gabriel. "Diocese of Sulmona-Valva". GCatholic.org. (for Chronology of Bishops) ^{[self-published]}

Catholic Church titles
Preceded by Pompeo Zambeccari	Bishop of Valva e Sulmona; 1571–1585	Succeeded by Francesco Carusi
