= Pamphilus of Sulmona =

Catholic saint

Saint Pamphilus
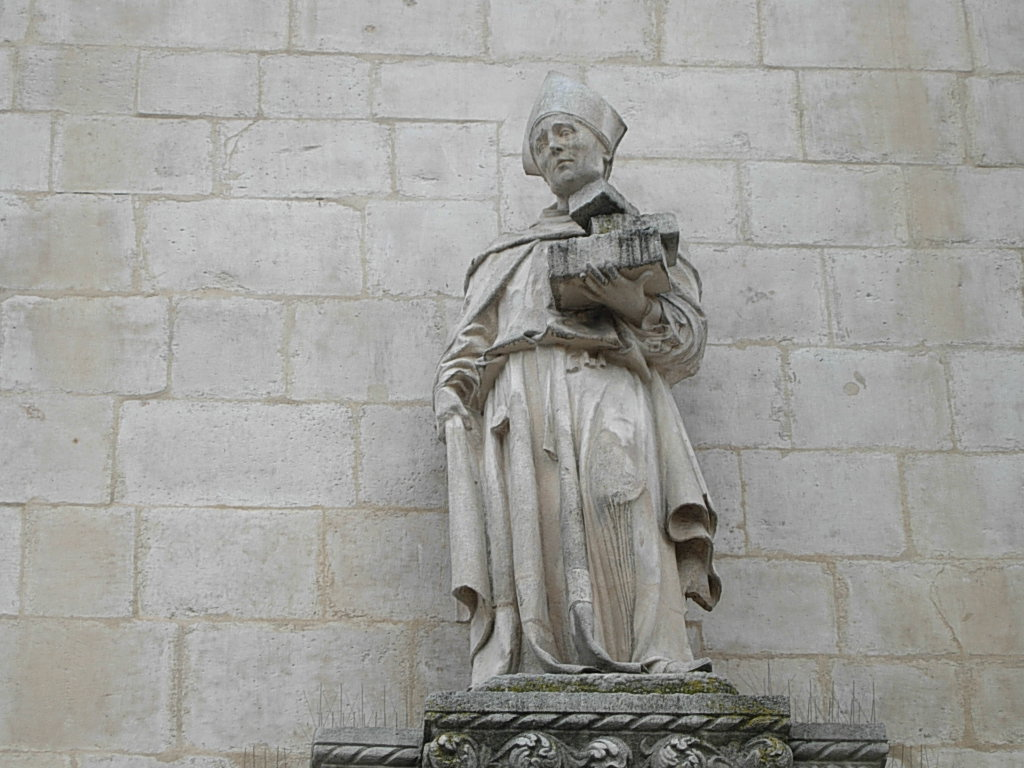
- Statue of Saint Pamphilus on the front of the Palazzo dell'Annunziata in Sulmona

Bishop of Sulmona-Valva
- Died: c. 700; Corfinio, Italy
- Venerated in: Catholic Church, Eastern Orthodox Church
- Canonized: Pre-congregation
- Feast: 28 April
- Patronage: Sulmona, Spoltore, Scerni, and Ocre

Pamphilus of Sulmona (Italian: Panfilo di Sulmona, died c. AD 700) was bishop of Sulmona and Corfinio (Valva) during the late 7th century. He is revered as a saint by the Catholic Church and the Eastern Orthodox Church.

== Biography ==
Pamphilus was born in Abruzzo, probably around the middle of the 7th century. He was the son of a pagan who repudiated him when he converted to Christianity. He was elected bishop of Sulmona in 682. He is traditionally described as a person of a very generous and kindly spirit who was much concerned with the evangelization of the invading Lombards.

While bishop, he was accused of Arianism by his clergy, but was acquitted of these charges by Pope Sergius I, who compensated Pamphilus with alms for the poor in his diocese.

He died at Corfinio around the year 700. His remains are located in the Sulmona Cathedral, which is dedicated to Pamphilus.

== Veneration ==
He is the patron saint of the cities of Sulmona, Spoltore, Scerni, and Ocre, where there are churches dedicated to him, including Sulmona Cathedral. His feast is April 28.
