= Sacri Cuori di Gesù e Maria a Tor Fiorenza =

- Church of the Sacred Hearts of Jesus and Mary at Tor Fiorenza
- Chiesa dei Sacri Cuori di Gesù e Maria a Tor Fiorenza
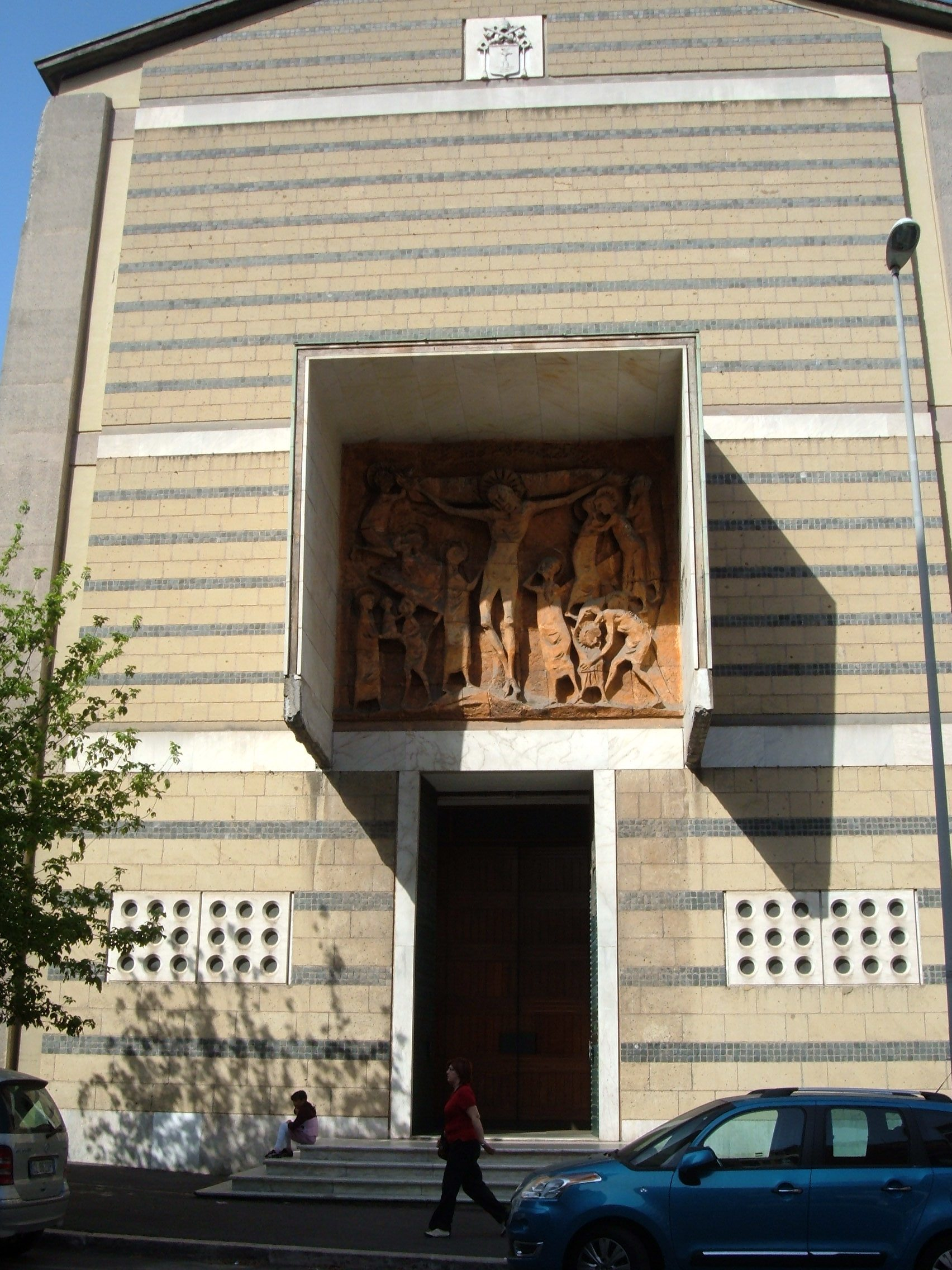
- Facade, with alternating rows of tuff, basalt and travertine
- Click on the map for a fullscreen view
- 41°56′03″N 12°30′40″E
- Location: Via Poggio Moiano, 8–18, Rome
- Country: Italy
- Language: Italian
- Denomination: Catholic
- Tradition: Roman Rite
- Website: parrocchiasacricuoriroma.net

History
- Status: titular church
- Founded: 1954
- Dedication: Sacred Heart of Jesus, Immaculate Heart of Mary
- Consecrated: 18 March 1957

Architecture
- Architect(s): Mario Paniconi and Giulio Pediconi
- Architectural type: Modern
- Completed: 1957

Administration
- Diocese: Rome

Sacri Cuori di Gesù e Maria a Tor Fiorenza is a 20th-century parochial church and titular church in Rome, dedicated to the Sacred Heart of Jesus and Immaculate Heart of Mary.

== Parish church ==
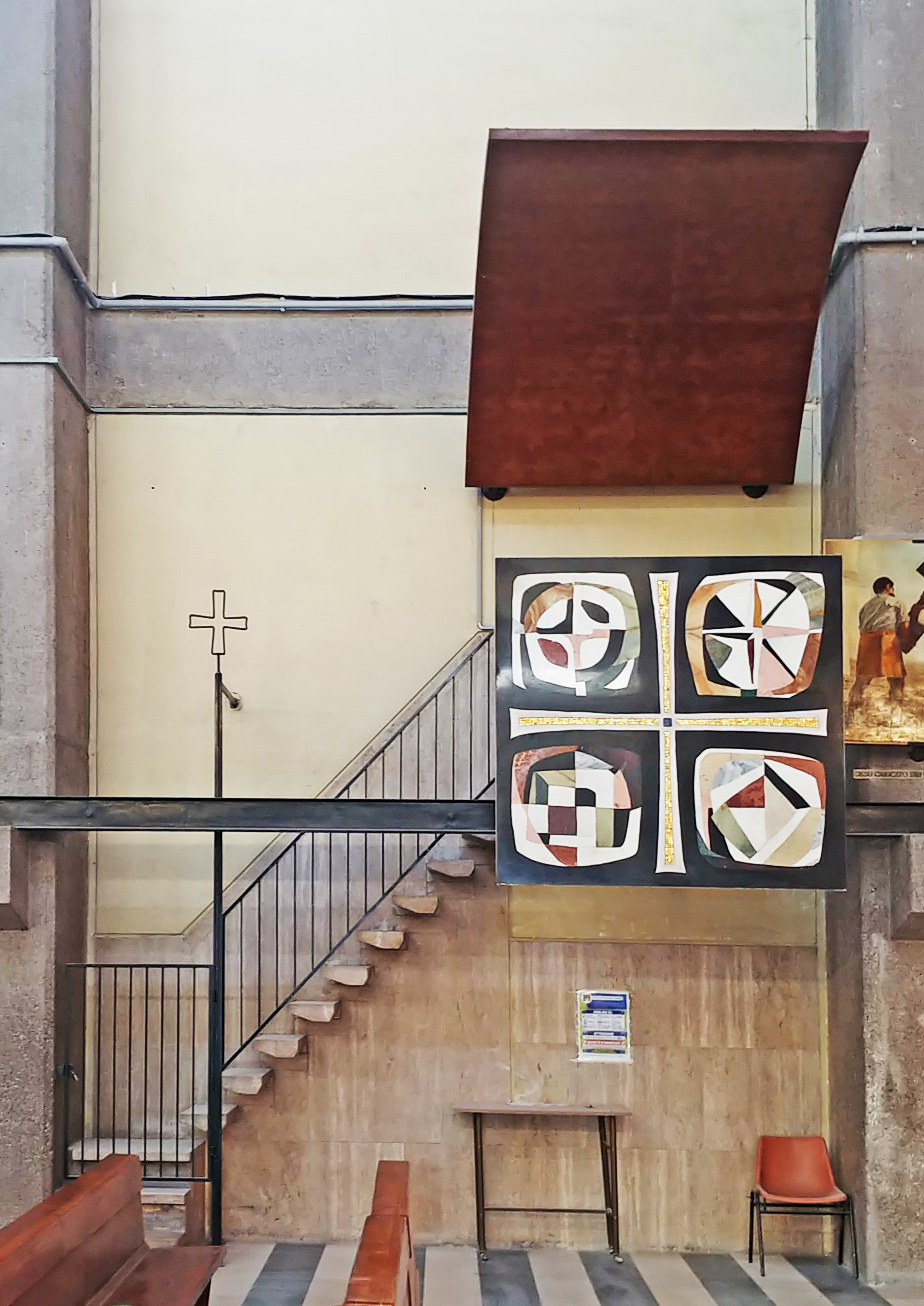
Pulpit

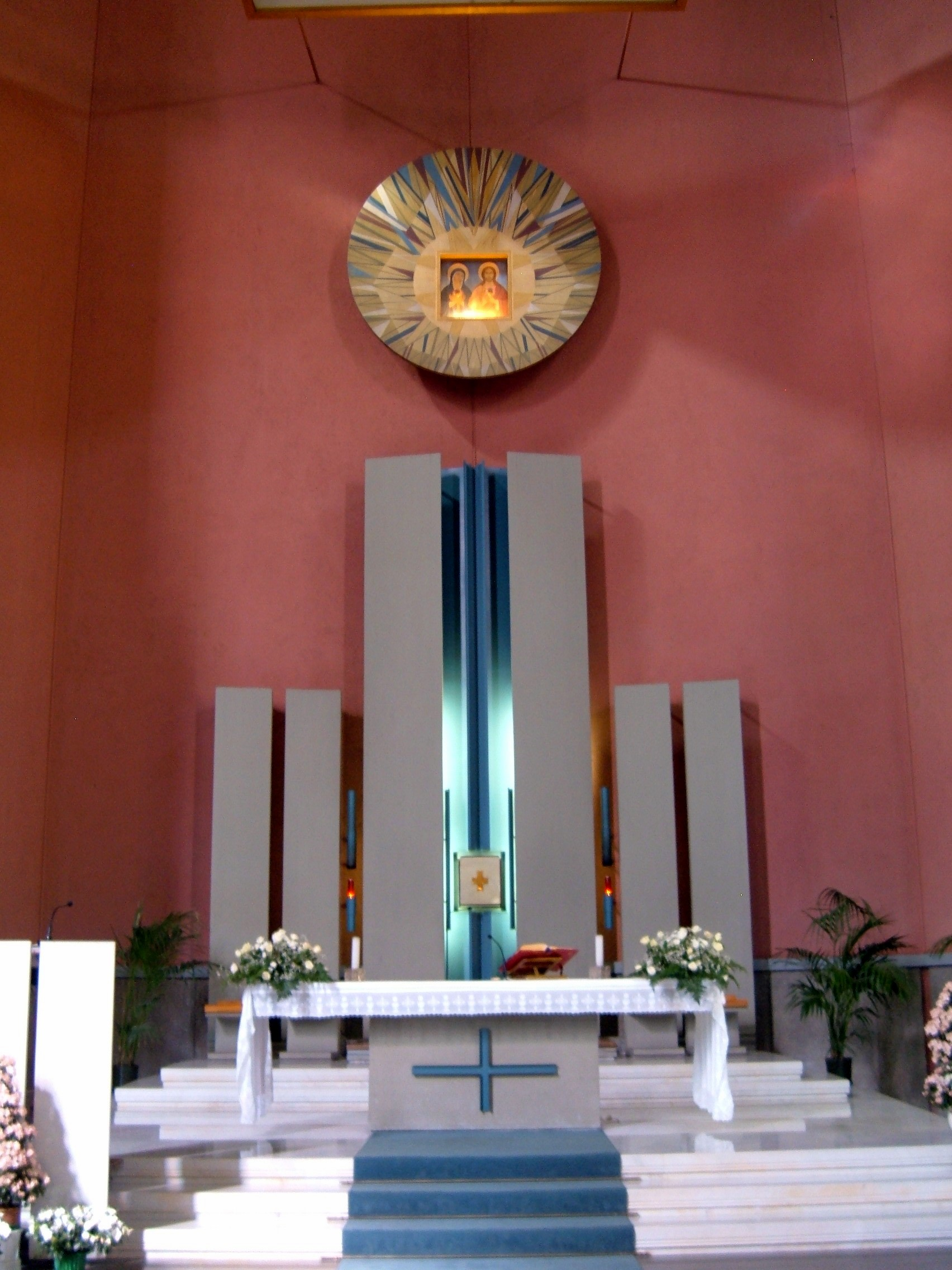
Altar

The church was built in 1954–57.

On 14 February 2015, it was made a titular church to be held by a cardinal-priest.

List

- Edoardo Menichelli (2015–2025)
