= Jubilee Church =

- Church of God the Merciful Father
- Chiesa di Dio Padre Misericordioso

- Location within Rome
- 41°52′57″N 12°35′08″E
- Location: Piazza Largo Terzo Millennio, Rome
- Country: Italy
- Language: Italian
- Denomination: Catholic
- Tradition: Roman Rite
- Website: diopadremisericordioso.it

History
- Dedication: God the Father

Architecture
- Architectural type: Modern
- Completed: 2003

Specifications
- Materials: concrete

Administration
- Diocese: Rome

The Jubilee Church, formally known as Chiesa di Dio Padre Misericordioso (Italian for "Church of God the Merciful Father"), is a Catholic church and community center in Tor Tre Teste in Rome. According to Richard Meier, its architect, it is "the crown jewel of the Vicariato di Roma's (Archdiocese of Rome) Millennium project" (p. 354). The church serves eight thousand residents of the Tor Tre Teste area and was meant to socially "revive" Tor Tre Teste.

Meier was selected as the architect as winner of a competition that included famous architects such as Frank Gehry, Santiago Calatrava and Tadao Ando in 1996.

== The site ==
The church's site is divided into four main parts: first, the precinct, including the church and community center; second, the northeast terrace; third, the northwest recreation court; fourth, the west parking area.

== Design and construction ==
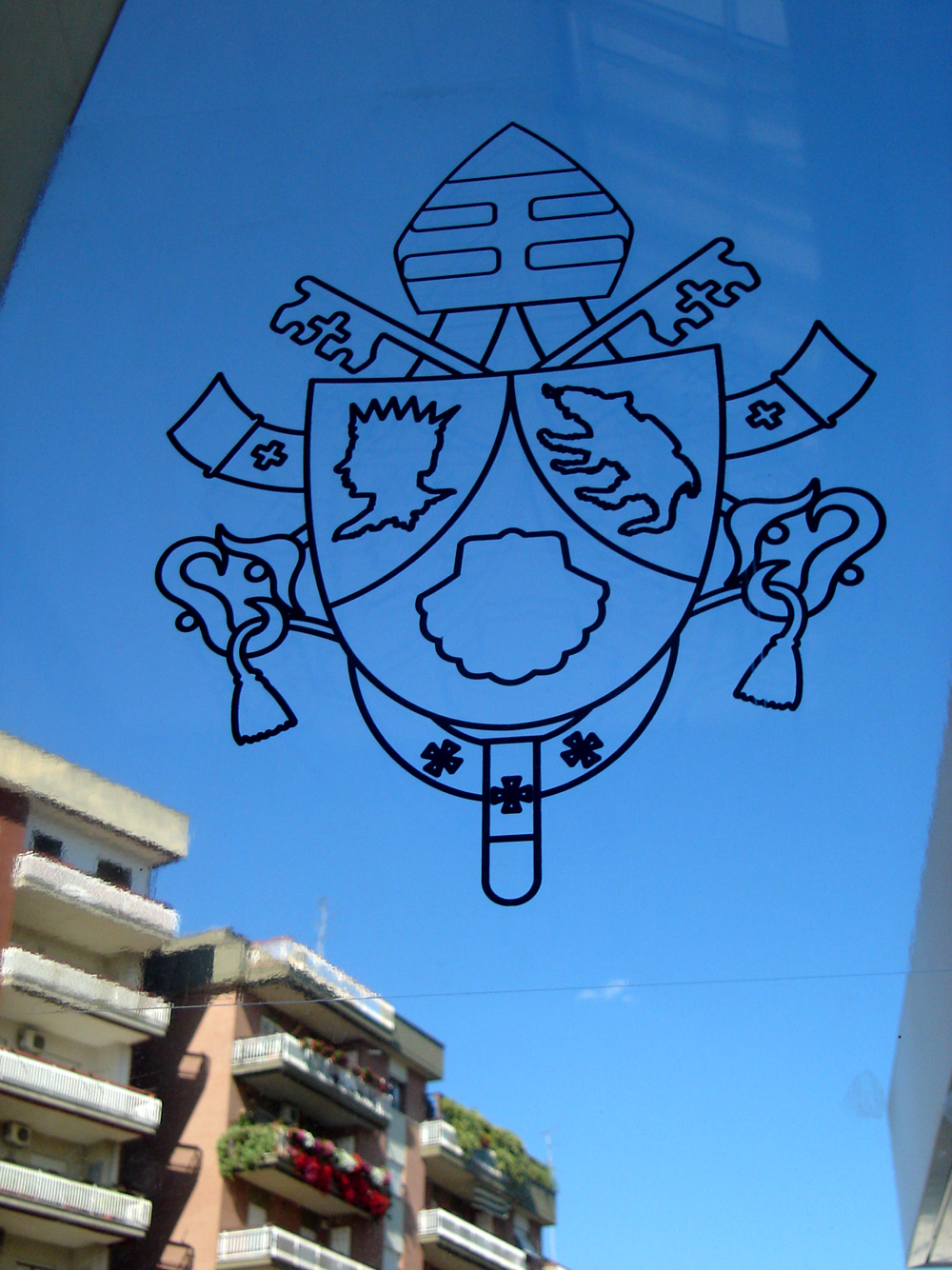
Papal coat of arms of Benedict XVI

Designed to look like a ship, the south side of the church features three large curved walls of pre-cast concrete. (The walls form segments of spheres.) Meier claims to have designed the church to minimize thermal peak loads inside. The large thermal mass of the concrete walls control internal heat gain; the result is less temperature variation, and supposedly more efficient use of energy. The walls are coated with a titanium dioxide-based cement (also known as photocatalytic cement), to keep the appearance of the church white and free of plant-growth. Enrico Borgarello, the director of research and development for Italcementi, the company that designed the cement, claims that the cement destroys air pollution.

According to Borgarello:

"When the titanium dioxide absorbs ultraviolet light, it becomes powerfully reactive, breaking down pollutants that come in contact with the concrete. It is particularly good at attacking the noxious gases that come out of a cars [sic] exhaust pipe."

== Cardinal protectors ==
- Crescenzio Sepe (cardinal-deacon 2001–2006; cardinal-priest pro hac vice 2006–present)

== See also ==
- Churches of Rome
