= Pollutri =

- Comune
- Comune di Pollutri
- Location within Italy Location within Abruzzo
- Coordinates: 42°8′N 14°36′E
- Country: Italy
- Region: Abruzzo
- Province: Chieti (CH)
- Frazioni: Civita, Crivella, Martina, Piano Croce, Piano Palme, Piano Valle, San Barbato

Area
  - Total: 26 km^{2} (10 sq mi)
- Elevation: 180 m (590 ft)

Population (2004)
  - Total: 2,334
  - Density: 90/km^{2} (230/sq mi)
- Demonym: Pollutresi
- Time zone: UTC+1 (CET)
  - Summer (DST): UTC+2 (CEST)
- Postal code: 66020
- Dialing code: 0873
- ISTAT code: 069068
- Patron saint: San Nicola
- Saint day: 6 December
- Website: Official website

Pollutri (Abruzzese: Pillùtre, Pillìtre) is a comune and town in the Province of Chieti in the Abruzzo region of Italy.

There are many legends regarding the birth of Pollutri, all the fruit of popular imagination. The most famous Lombard refers to a prince who had decided to build a country where he found a lost colt. In reality, things were a little different. In 568 the Lombards, under the leadership of King Albano, took to Italy in search of new sources of income and with a quick campaign of war occupied the north of Italy, Tuscany, Abruzzo, Molise, Campania and Basilicata.

At that time the hill on which Pollutri now stands was covered with thick forests and there were only a few huts of shepherds and farmers. The Lombards, soon arrived and did their utmost to integrate with the indigenous population. The village was expanded so much that in 580 it had already become very important and its territory reached to the sea, bounded by the Sinello Osento rivers. The name Pollutri derives from a temple dedicated to Pollux.

In the Middle Ages the Pollutrian territory was ruled by a royal emissary who lived in Vasto. From 1279 when King Charles came down into Italy and campaigned throughout the South, Pollutri became part of the Kingdom of Naples, from which depended politically until 1860, when Garibaldi drove out the Bourbons. In this same year, King Charles imposed heavy taxes. On 28 August 1292, The University, which was the center of civil life, elected as supreme judges of Pollutri: James Gizio, Di Stefano De Lorenzo and Roberto Fura.

From 1300 to 1600 there is a gap in the history of civil and religious life in Pollutri due to the loss of the "BOOK OF THE REFORM OF THE TOWN" and "THE BOOK OF RESOLUTIONS AND OPINIONS OF 'UNIVERSITY' Pollutri", the first of which reported news from 1313 to 1613 and the second from 1613 to 1729. These are stored in the municipal archive the "BOOK OF LIGHTING CANDLES" and the "RESOLUTIONS OF THE UNIVERSITY' OF Pollutri" that report news from 1729 to 1769.

However, we can not yet speak of Pollutri as a real commune because it did not have its own laws as municipalities of the north and, consequently, did not yet enjoy real independence and depended directly or indirectly on the King of Naples, who had entrusted with the government of its noble families in the area of Vasto and Monteodorisio. As mentioned, very little is known of the period of 1300 - 1600. Only the historian Nicola Faraglia in "Review of Abruzzo" (Casalbordino, Edition De Angelis, 1898, no. 5-6 page 225) gives mention of the censuses of 1447 and 1596. In 1447 it records seventy families and 353 inhabitants, and in 1596 it rose to 133 families while ignoring the exact number of population.

In 1576 Alessandro Muzio saw an apparition of the Virgin Mary, which was reported by his son Joseph, dean of Pollutri in the book one of those baptized, and those confirmed dead, preserved in the parish, and summarized by Gabriele D'Annunzio in "The Triumph of Death" (edition of Treves, Milan, pages 297-1903).

In 1669 Pollutri was part of the estate of Prince Matteo di Capua Basin. Until the descent of the Swabians, the territory of its municipality was ruled by royal emissaries. Later he joined the County Monteodorisio which had as its first feudal lord Odorisio count Marsi. The county included twelve other regions: Pennaluce, Cupello, Scerni, Casalbordino, Guildford, Villalfonsina, Lentella, Furci, Gissi, Casalanguida, Smooth Colledimezzo. The county government was subsequently entrusted to Conrad of Antioch, the grandson of Frederick II. With the defeat at the hands of the Swabians Anjou, the County of Monteodorisio, which as said also included the lands of Pollutri, was assigned to Boniface of Gilberto and later to Charles of Artois, Lalle Campaneschi, Louis of Taranto and the Francesco del Cozzo del Borgo who left everything to his only daughter Giovanna. She, after marrying Francesco D'Aquino, Earl of Penne, lost the county by the troops of Braccio di Montone and Sforza Attendolo.

Not long thereafter, the Earl of Penne, Francesco D'Aquino, with fresh, well-trained troops, regained Monteodorisio County, and therefore also the territory of Pollutri, which he at once gave to his niece Antonella, wife of Junichi d'Avalos, brave general of Spanish origin. From 1700 Pollutri has been tied to the line of the D'Avalos of Vasto.
