= Ventricina =

Italian dry pork sausage

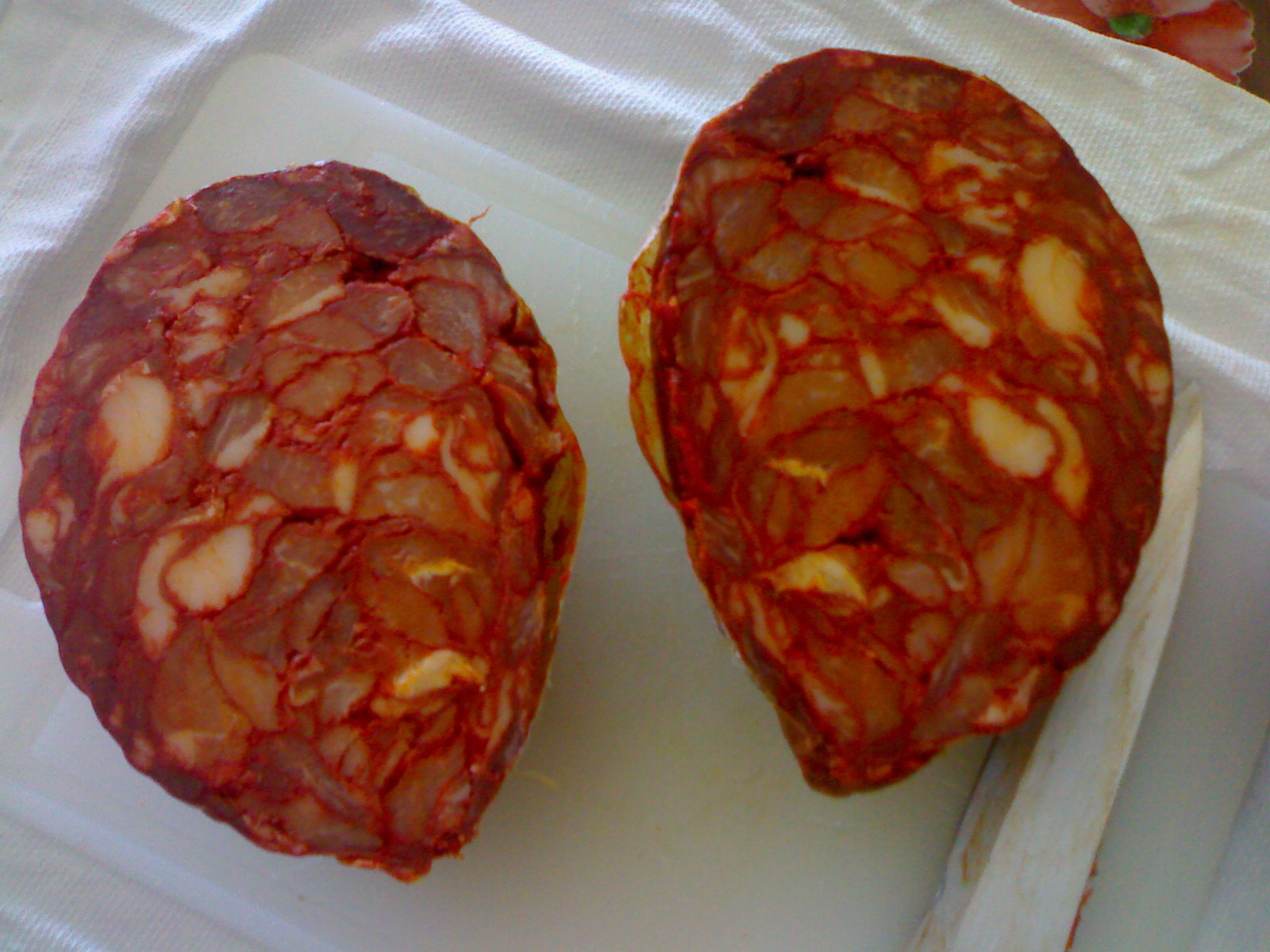
Ventricina del vastese

Ventricina is a dry fermented pork sausage commonly produced in the Abruzzo region of Italy. Its most common artisanal version, ventricina del vastese, from the Vasto area, is made with large pieces of fat and lean pork.

The meat is pressed and seasoned with powdered sweet peppers and fennel and encased in dried pig stomach.

The name derives from the belly of the pig giving the sausage its typical subovoid shape. It is officially recognised as a traditional agri-food product of Abruzzo (prodotti agroalimentari tradizionali abruzzesi).
