= Monteodorisio =

- Comune
- Comune di Monteodorisio
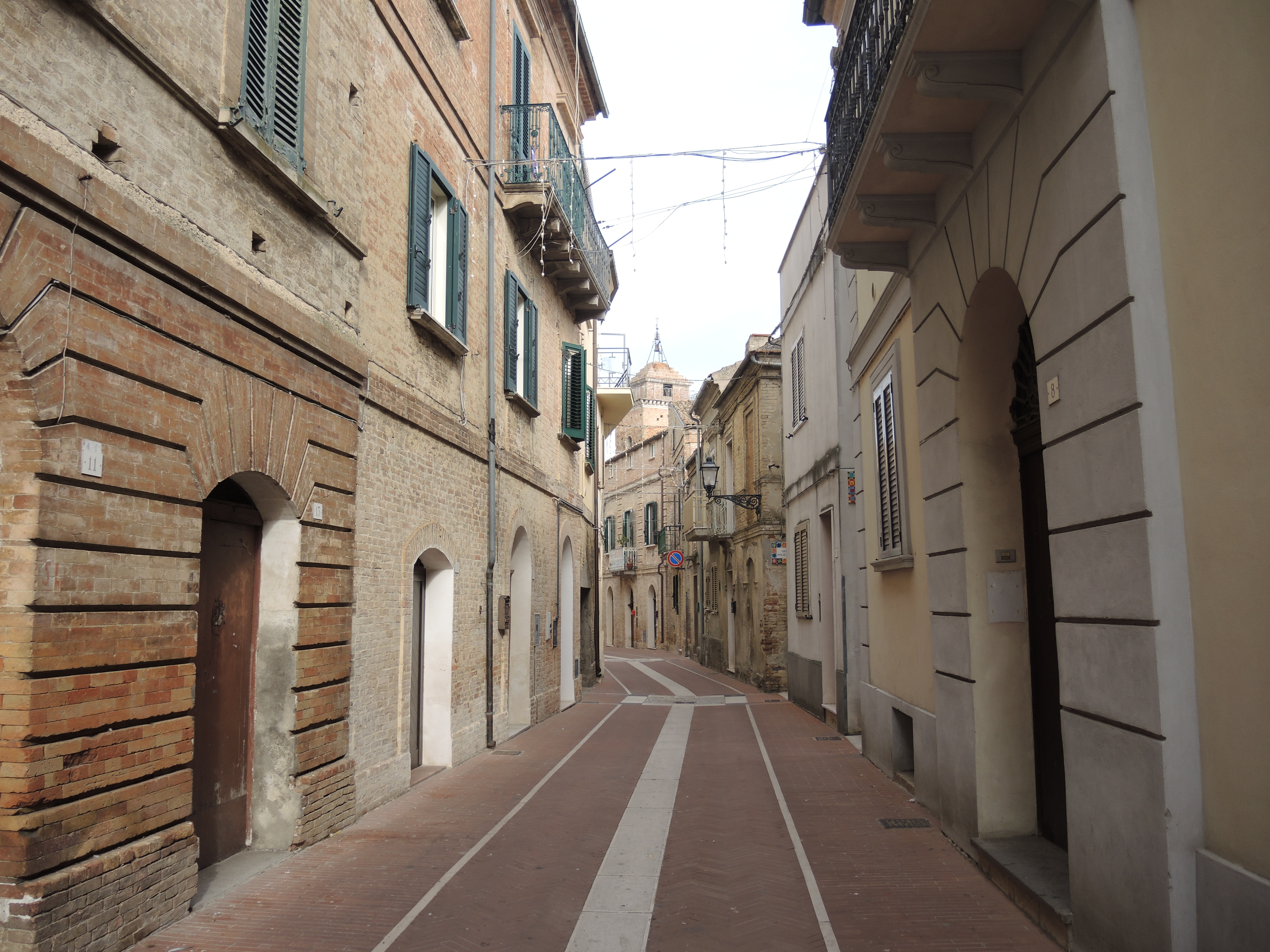

- Coat of arms

- Location within Italy Location within Abruzzo
- Coordinates: 42°05′N 14°39′E
- Country: Italy
- Region: Abruzzo
- Province: Chieti (CH)

Government
  - Mayor: Catia Di Fabio

Area
  - Total: 25 km^{2} (9.7 sq mi)
- Elevation: 315 m (1,033 ft)

Population (2004)
  - Total: 2,475
  - Density: 99/km^{2} (260/sq mi)
- Demonym: Monteodorisiani
- Time zone: UTC+1 (CET)
  - Summer (DST): UTC+2 (CEST)
- Postal code: 66050
- Dialing code: +39
- Patron saint: St. Marcellinus
- Saint day: Second Sunday of May
- Website: www.comune.monteodorisio.ch.it

Monteodorisio (Abruzzese: Mundrìscë, Mundrèiscë) is a comune (municipality) and town in the province of Chieti, in the region of Abruzzo, in central Italy.

It is home to a 13th-century castle. It has three circular towers, and walls 4 metres (13 ft) high. It is a small town between Vasto and the Abruzzo Mountains.
