= Roman Catholic Diocese of Valva =

The Diocese of Valva (Latin: Dioecesis Valvensis) was a Roman Catholic diocese. In the 13th century, it was united with the Diocese of Sulmona to form the Diocese of Valva e Sulmona.
