= Angelo Spina =

The Most Reverend Angelo Spina
- Archbishop of Ancona-Osimo
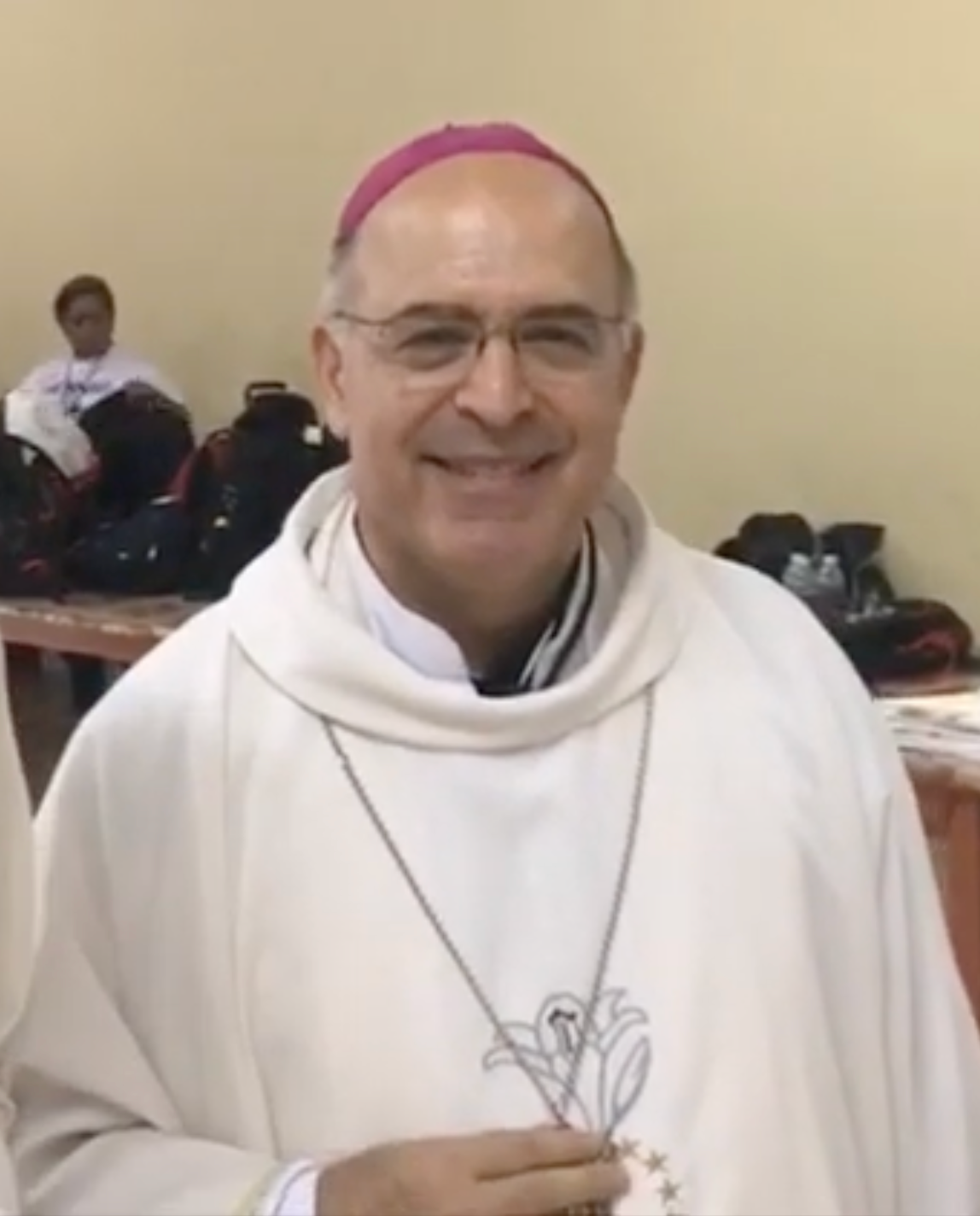
- Church: Roman Catholic Church
- Archdiocese: Ancona-Osimo
- See: Ancona-Osimo
- Appointed: 14 July 2017
- Installed: 1 October 2017
- Predecessor: Edoardo Menichelli
- Previous post: Bishop of Sulmona-Valva (2007-17)

Orders
- Ordination: 5 January 1980 by Pietro Santoro
- Consecration: 9 June 2007 by Armando Dini

Personal details
- Born: Angelo Spina; 13 November 1954 Colle d'Anchise, Campobasso, Italy
- Motto: In caritate coniuncti
- Coat of arms

Angelo Spina (born 13 November 1954) is an Italian Roman Catholic prelate and the current Archbishop of Ancona-Osimo since his appointment in 2017. Spina served prior to this as the Bishop of Sulmona-Valva since being raised to the episcopate in 2007. He has served in various capacities throughout his priesthood and episcopate: religious education teacher and instructor for new teachers as well as a parish priest and vicar.

== Life ==
Angelo Spina was born on 13 November 1954 in Colle d'Anchise in the Campobasso province.

Spina began his theological studies in 1974 Benevento after his initial ecclesial studies from 1968 in Campobasso under the supervision of the Order of Friars Minor Capuchin. He first received his ordination into the diaconate from Alberto Carinci in 1977 prior to Pietro Santoro ordaining him to the priesthood in Colle d'Anchise on 5 January 1980. From 1980 until 1999 he served as a parish priest for the Campochiaro and San Paolo Matese parishes while from 1980 to 1985 serving as a religious education teacher at a high school in Boiano. Spina later oversaw the formation of religious education teachers for schools in Molise from 1985 to 1996. From 1996 to 2000 he served as an episcopal vicar for the Great Jubilee of 2000 that Pope John Paul II had convoked. In 1999 he was named as the pastor for the Boiano Cathedral. In 2003 he was named as the episcopal vicar for diocesan missions and then from 2004 to 2007 for the Santuario dell'Addolorata.

He received his episcopal consecration in the Santuario dell'Addolorata in Castelpetroso on 9 June 2007 from Armando Dini with Antonio Nuzzi and Giuseppe Di Falco serving as the co-consecrators. Spina was then installed in his new see on 23 June. On 17 January 2013 he attended the "ad limina apostolorum" visit to Pope Benedict XVI.

On 14 July 2017 he was appointed as the newest Archbishop of Ancona-Osimo to succeed the retiring Cardinal Edoardo Menichelli. Spina was installed in his new archdiocese on 1 October.
