= Diocese of Sulmona-Valva =

Latin Catholic diocese in Italy

Coordinates: 42.048025°N 13.926198°E

Diocese of Sulmona-Valva Dioecesis Sulmonensis-Valvensis

Catholic
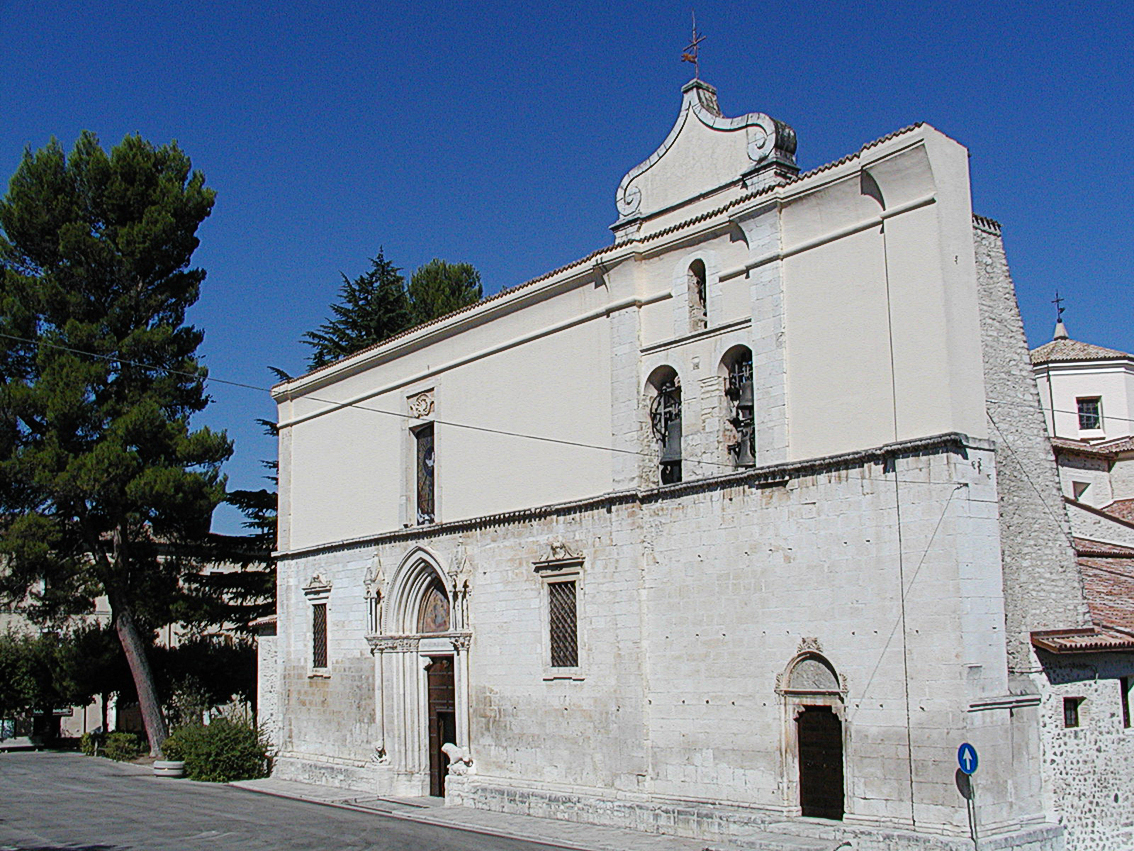
- Sulmona Cathedral

Location
- Country: Italy
- Ecclesiastical province: L'Aquila

Statistics
- Area: 1,814 km^{2} (700 sq mi)
- Population: Total; Catholics: (as of 2022); 79,681 ▼; 78,842 ▼
- Parishes: 76

Information
- Denomination: Catholic Church
- Sui iuris church: Latin Church
- Rite: Roman Rite
- Established: 6th Century
- Cathedral: Basilica Cattedrale di S. Panfilo Vescovo (Sulmona)
- Co-cathedral: Concattedrale di S. Pelino (Corfinio)
- Patron saint: Saint Pamphilus
- Secular priests: 41 (diocesan) ▼16 (Religious Orders) ▼8 Permanent Deacons

Current leadership
- Pope: Leo XIV
- Bishop: Michele Fusco
- Bishops emeritus: Giuseppe Di Falco

Map
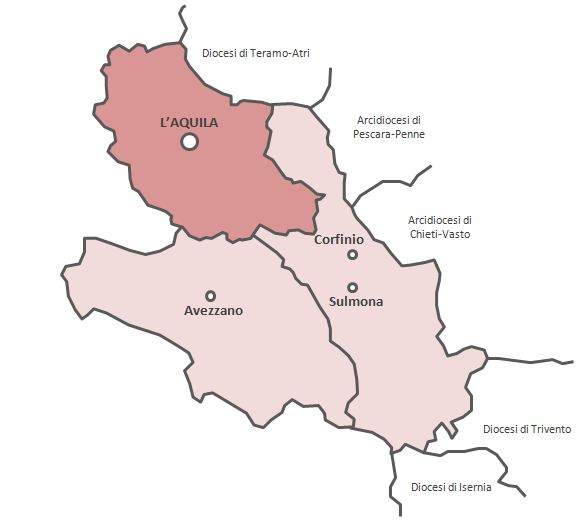

Website
- www.diocesisulmona-valva.it

The Diocese of Sulmona-Valva (Latin: Dioecesis Sulmonensis-Valvensis) is a Latin Church diocese of the Catholic Church in central Italy, in the Abruzzi region, approximately 120 km (75 mi) directly east of Rome. Corfinio (Valva) is 14 km north-northwest of Sulmona.

The current configuration was created in 1986, through the union of the two dioceses into one. The combined single diocese is a suffragan of the Archdiocese of L'Aquila. In 1818, the status of the Diocese of Sulmona and the Diocese of Valva was acknowledged, as two separate dioceses united in having one and the same person as bishop of both dioceses, aeque personaliter, an arrangement which stretched all the way back to the 13th century, and earlier.

== History ==
In the Lombard period Sulmona was subject to the Duchy of Spoleto; later it belonged to the counts of Marsi. When the Normans conquered the Abruzzi, Sulmona increased in importance. In 1233, Emperor Frederick II made it the capital of the "Gran Giustizierato" of the Abruzzi.

=== Fictional origins ===
Legend associates the evangelization of the district with the name of Saint Britius, Bishop of Spoleto, in the second century. Local legend in Sulmona credits the evangelization with Saint Feliciano, Bishop of Foligno, in the middle of the third century. He is said to have reconsecrated the temple of Apollo and Vesta as the cathedral of S. Maria Regina de Caelo (Santa Maria in Bussi), which, at the beginning of the 9th century, had its name changed to S. Panfilo. The claim, however, has no evidence to support it.

=== Early bishops ===
The first known Bishop of Sulmona is Palladius (499); in 503. Pamphilus of Sulmona, Bishop of Valva, died about 706; he was buried in Sulmona Cathedral.

Four or five other bishops of Valva are known, but none of Sulmona until 1054, when Pope Leo IX named as Bishop of Valva, the Benedictine Domenico, and determined the limits of the Dioceses of San Pelino (Saint Pelinus) (i.e., Valva) and San Panfilo (Saint Pamphilus) (i.e., Sulmona), which were to have only one bishop, elected by the two chapters. On 25 March 1138, Pope Innocent II wrote to Bishop Dodo, reconfirming his possessions and privileges, and mentioning in passing that the bishop had his throne at S. Pelini, in Corfinio (Valva): "Ecclesiam santi Pelini, ubi Episcopalis habetur sedes." The body of S. Pelinus had been transferred to the church of S. Pelino in Corfinio (Valva) in 1124.

=== Normans ===
In 1143 King Roger II of Sicily invaded Campania and seized the monastery of Montecassino, all of whose treasures he confiscated. The territory of the Marsi surrendered to him. His sons occupied the territory of Marsi, which included not only the County of Marsi, but the County of Valva. Bishop Dodo was already dead, having died (according to Di Pietro) in 1142. King Roger appointed new bishops at Chieti and Valva.

On 7 April 1168, the cathedral Chapter of S, Pelino and the cathedral Chapter of S. Panfilo entered into an agreement that both had the right to participate in the naming a bishop.

On 16 October 1256, Bishop Giacomo di Penne, a former monk of Casa Nova, presided over a meeting of the canons of the two cathedrals, at which it was agreed that the two chapters should unite in electing a bishop, as frequent disputes had arisen when they acted separately.

In the winter of 1336/1337, a group of armed men stationed themselves in the cathedral of S. Pamfilo in Sulmona, in order (they said) to prevent others from attacking or occupying it. In the especially cold winter weather, they tore up the flooring of the episcopal palace next door, took out the wooden beams, and made fires to keep warm. The palace was severely damaged.

Other bishops were: Pompeo Zambeccari (1547–1571), nuncio in Portugal from March 1550 to July 1560; Francesco Boccapaduli (1638); and Pietro Antonio Corsignani (1738), the historian of the Abruzzi.

=== Earthquakes ===
In the earthquake of 5 December 1456, Sulmona was "for the most part destroyed". On 3 November 1706, a major earthquake devastated Sulmona and Valva. The cathedral of S. Pamfilo in Sulmona was completely destroyed, along with its chapels, and the entire episcopal palace was levelled. Approximately 1,000 people died. Major earthquakes also occurred in 1915, 1933, 1984, and 2009.

=== French occupation ===
The see remained vacant from 1800 till 1818. From 1809 to 1815, Pope Pius VII was a prisoner of Napoleon in France, and his policy was not to cooperate with the French in filling bishoprics. When Napoleon did so on his own authority as King of Italy, it created havoc in one diocese after another. The vacancy also saw the occupation of Sulmona by the French, beginning on 6 January 1799, and the suppression of all the religious orders in 1807. When the Congress of Vienna restored the Papal States and the Kingdom of the Two Sicilies in 1815, disputes arose between the Holy See and the Kingdom of the Two Sicilies, involving matters of restoration of church property, and the issue of feudal submission of King Ferdinand to Pope Pius VII. Three years of negotiations were necessary. A concordat was finally signed on 16 February 1818, and ratified by Pius VII on 25 February 1818. Ferdinand issued the concordat as a law on 21 March 1818. The re-erection of the dioceses of the kingdom and the ecclesiastical provinces took more than three years. The right of the king to nominate the candidate for a vacant bishopric was recognized, as in the Concordat of 1741, subject to papal confirmation (preconisation).

On 27 June 1818, Pius VII issued the bull De Ulteriore, in which, in the cases of several dioceses, Sulmona and Valva among them, no change was made from the status quo ante. On 25 September 1818, Pope Pius granted the cathedral of S. Pamfilo in Sulmona the honorary title of "minor basilica".

=== Reorganization ===
Following the Second Vatican Council, and in accordance with the norms laid out in the council's decree, Christus Dominus chapter 40, Pope Paul VI ordered a reorganization of the ecclesiastical provinces in southern Italy. On 15 August 1972, a new ecclesiastical province was created, with L'Aquila, which had previously been directly subject to the Holy See, as the new metropolitan archbishopric. The diocese of the Marsi (later renamed Avezzano) and the diocese of Valva e Sulmona were appointed suffragans.

=== Diocesan unification ===
On 18 February 1984, the Vatican and the Italian State signed a new and revised concordat. Based on the revisions, a set of Normae was issued on 15 November 1984, which was accompanied in the next year, on 3 June 1985, by enabling legislation. According to the agreement, the practice of having one bishop govern two separate dioceses at the same time, aeque personaliter, was abolished. The Vatican continued consultations which had begun under Pope John XXIII for the merging of small dioceses, especially those with personnel and financial problems, into one combined diocese.

On 30 September 1986, Pope John Paul II ordered that the diocese of Sulmona and the diocese of Valva be merged into one diocese with one bishop, with the Latin title Dioecesis Sulmonensis-Valvensis. The seat of the diocese was to be in Sulmona, where the cathedral was to serve as the cathedral of the merged dioceses. The cathedral in Valva was to have the honorary title of "co-cathedral"; the Chapter of Valva was to be a Capitulum Concathedralis. There was to be only one diocesan Tribunal, in Sulmona, and likewise one seminary, one College of Consultors, and one Priests' Council. The territory of the new diocese was to include the territory of the suppressed dioceses of Sulmona and Valva. The new diocese was made a suffragan of the archdiocese of L'Aquila.

Diocesan synods were held in 1572, 1590, 1603, 1620, 1629, and 1715. In 1572, the meeting was held at S. Pamfilo in Sulmona, but the canons of S. Pelino in Valva, though they attended, presented a memorial claiming precedence over the canons of S. Pamfilo. A diocesan synod was held by Bishop Nicola Jezzoni (1906–1936) in 1929.

A new diocesan seminary was opened Sulmona in 1953.

== List of bishops ==
Postnominal initials: Benedictine = OSB, Dominican = OP, Cistercian = OCist, Franciscan = OFM, Minorite = OFMC, Augustinian = OESA, Oratorian = CO, Olivetan = OSBOliv

=== to 1300 ===
- Geruntius (mentioned in 494/495), bishop of Valva
- Palladius (mentioned in 499), bishop of Sulmona
- [Fortunatus (502)]
- Pamphilus (682–700), bishop of Sulmona
- Gradescus (mentioned in 701), bishop of Sulmona
- Vadpert (mentioned in 775)
- Ravennus (mentioned in 840)
- Arnulfus (mentioned in 843)
- Opitarmo (mentioned in 880)
- Grimoald (attested 968, 983)
- ? Tidelfus
- ? Transeric
- ? Suavilius
- Dominicus OSB (1053–1073)
- Transmundus (1073–1080)

...

- Joannes (1092–1104)
- Gualterius (1104–1124)

...

- Dodo (1130–1140)
- Gerardus (Giraldus) (1143–1145?)
- Sciginulfus (attested c. 1146–1167)
- Oderisius of Raino (1172–1193)
- Guilelmus (1194–1205)
- Odo (1207 – before 6 May 1226)

Sede vacante (1226–1227)

Berardus (1226–1227)

- Nicholas (1227–1247??)

Sede vacante (1235)
Walter of Ocra (1247)

- ? Jacobus (I) OCist (1249–1251?)
- Jacobus (II) O.Cist. (10 April 1252 – 1263)
- Jacobus (III) of Orvieto OP (6 March 1263 – after 1273)
- Egidius de Leodio OFM (25 February 1279 – 1290)

Guilelmus, OSB (28 August 1291 – 1294?) Administrator

- Pietro d'Aquila OSB (1294) Bishop-elect

=== 1300 to 1600 ===
- Federico Raimondo de Letto (1295 – 1307)
- Landulfus (4 June 1307 – 1319)
- Andrea Capograssi (25 May 1319 – 1330)
- Pietro di Anversa OFM (4 May 1330 – 1333)
- Nicolò di Pietro Rainaldi (30 October 1333 – 1343)
- Francesco di Sangro (12 February 1343 – 1348)
- Landulf II (2 July 1348 – 1349)
- Francesco de Silanis OFM (17 January 1350 – ????)
- Martino de Martinis (14 April 1368 – 1379)
- Roberto de Illice (18 April 1379 – 2 July 1382) Avignon Obedience
- Paolo da Letto (around 1379 – ????) Roman Obedience
- Nicola de Cervario OFM (2 July 1382 – 4 June 1397) Avignon Obedience
- Bartolomeo Gaspare (1384–????) Roman Obedience
- Bartolomeo Petrini (1402–1419) Roman Obedience
- Lotto Sardi (6 March 1420 – 21 May 1427), became Archbishop of Spoleto
- Benedetto Guidalotti (21 May 1427 – 29 October 1427), became Bishop of Teramo
- Bartolomeo Vinci (29 October 1427 – December 1442)
- Francesco de Oliveto OSB (12 August 1443 – 14 June 1447), became Bishop of Rapolla
- Pietro d'Aristotile (14 June 1447 – 1448)
- Donato Bottino OESA (4 September 1448 – 1463)
- Bartolomeo Scala OP (3 October 1463 – 1491)
- Giovanni Melini Gagliardi (7 November 1491 – 1499)

[Giovanni Acuti]

- Prospero de Rusticis (1499 – 1514)
- Giovanni Battista Cavicchio (28 July 1514 – 1519)

Andrea della Valle (26 October 1519 – 1521) Administrator

- Cristóbal de los Ríos (18 June 1521 – 1523)
- Orazio della Valle (17 July 1523 – 1528)
- Francisco de Lerma (14 August 1528 – ????)
- Bernardo Cavalieri delle Milizie (3 September 1529 – 1532)
- Bernardino Fumarelli (13 November 1532 – 5 June 1547)
- Pompeo Zambeccari (1 July 1547 – 8 August 1571)
- Vincenzo de Doncelli OP (24 September 1571 – 1585)
- Francesco Carusi OFMC (13 March or 13 May 15 85 – 4 September 1593)

=== Since 1600 ===
- Cesare del Pezzo (1593 – 1621)
- Francesco Cavalieri (21 July 1621 – 4 September 1637)
- Francesco Boccapaduli (1638 – 1647)
- Alessandro Masi (27 May 1647 – 12 September 1648)
- Francesco Carducci (22 March 1649 – 5 November 1654).
- Gregorio Carducci (14 June 1655 – 15 January 1701)
- Bonaventura Martinelli (21 November 1701–August 1715)
- Francesco Onofrio Odierna (1717 – 1727)
- Matteo Odierna, OSBOliv (1727 – 1738)
- Pietro Antonio Corsignani (1738 – 1751)
- Carlo De Ciocchis (24 January 1752 – 10 September 1762)
- Filippo Paini (22 November 1762 – 1799)
  - Sede vacante (1799–1818)
- Francesco Felice Tiberi, CO (1818 – 1829)
- Giuseppe Maria De Letto (1829 – 1839)
- Mario Mirone (1840 – 1853)
- Giovanni Sabatini (27 June 1853 – 10 March 1861)
  - Sede vacante (1861–1871)
- Tobia Patroni (22 December 1871 – 20 August 1906)
- Nicola Jezzoni (6 December 1906 – 18 July 1936), retired
- Luciano Marcante (14 March 1937 – 29 January 1972), retired
- Francesco Amadio (29 January 1972 – 14 May 1980), became Bishop of Rieti
- Salvatore Delogu (8 January 1981 – 25 May 1985), resigned
- Giuseppe Di Falco (25 May 1985 – 3 April 2007), retired
- Angelo Spina (3 April 2007 – 2017)
- Michele Fusco (30 November 2017 - )

== See also ==
- Corfinio (Valva)
- Diocese of Avezzano (Marsi)
- Roman Catholic Archdiocese of L'Aquila (metropolitan)
- List of Catholic dioceses in Italy

== Bibliography ==
=== Episcopal lists ===
- Eubel, Conradus, ed. (1913). Hierarchia catholica (in Latin). Vol. I (second ed.). Münster: Libreria Regensbergiana.
- Eubel, Conradus, ed. (1914). Hierarchia catholica (in Latin). Vol. II (second ed.). Münster: Libreria Regensbergiana.
- Eubel, Conradus; Gulik, Guilelmus (1923). Hierarchia catholica (in Latin). Vol. III (second ed.). Münster: Libreria Regensbergiana.
- Gams, Pius Bonifatius (1873). Series episcoporum Ecclesiae catholicae: quotquot innotuerunt a beato Petro apostolo (in Latin). Ratisbon: Typis et Sumptibus Georgii Josephi Manz. pp. 928–929.
- Gauchat, Patritius (Patrice) (1935). Hierarchia catholica (in Latin). Vol. IV (1592-1667). Münster: Libraria Regensbergiana.
- Ritzler, Remigius; Sefrin, Pirminus (1952). Hierarchia catholica medii et recentis aevi (in Latin). Vol. V (1667-1730). Patavii: Messagero di S. Antonio.
- Ritzler, Remigius; Sefrin, Pirminus (1958). Hierarchia catholica medii et recentis aevi (in Latin). Vol. VI (1730-1799). Patavii: Messagero di S. Antonio.
- Ritzler, Remigius; Sefrin, Pirminus (1968). Hierarchia Catholica medii et recentioris aevi (in Latin). Vol. VII (1800–1846). Monasterii: Libreria Regensburgiana.
- Remigius Ritzler; Pirminus Sefrin (1978). Hierarchia catholica Medii et recentioris aevi (in Latin). Vol. VIII (1846–1903). Il Messaggero di S. Antonio.
- Pięta, Zenon (2002). Hierarchia catholica medii et recentioris aevi (in Latin). Vol. IX (1903–1922). Padua: Messagero di San Antonio. ISBN 978-88-250-1000-8.

=== Studies ===
- Amadio, Francesco, and others (1980). La Cattedrale di San Panfilo a Sulmona (in Italian). Cinisello Balsamo (Milano): Silvana, 1980.
- Cappelletti, Giuseppe (1870). Le chiese d'Italia dalla loro origine sino ai nostri giorni (in Italian). Vol. vigesimoprimo (21). Venezia: Antonelli. pp. 440–443.
- D'Avino, Vincenzio (1848). Cenni storici sulle chiese arcivescovili, vescovili, e prelatizie (nullius) del regno delle due Sicilie (in Italian). Naples: dalle stampe di Ranucci. pp. 735–744.
- Di Pietro, Ignazio (1804). Memorie storiche della città di Solmona. (in Italian). Napoli: stamp. di A. Raimondi, 1804.
- Di Pietro, Ignazio (1806). Memorie storiche degli uomini illustri della città di Solmona raccolte dal P. D. Ignazio di Pietro ... con breve serie de' vescovi solmonesi e valvesi ... (in Italian). Aquila: nella stamperia Grossiana, 1806.
- Kehr, Paul Fridolin (1908). Italia pontificia. vol. IV. Berlin 1909. pp. 252–266. (in Latin)
- Lanzoni, Francesco (1927). Le diocesi d'Italia dalle origini al principio del secolo VII (an. 604). Faenza: F. Lega. (in Italian) pp. 372–373.
- Orsini, Pasquale (2005). Archivio storico della Curia diocesana di Sulmona: Inventario. (in Italian and Latin). Sulmona: Diocesi di Sulmona–Valva 2005.
- Piccirilli, P. (1901), "Notizie su la primitiva cattedrale sulmonese e un'antica iscrizione creduta smarrita," in: Rivista abruzzese di scienze, lettere ed arti, VOl. 17 (1901), pp. 336–339.
- Schwartz, Gerhard (1907). Die Besetzung der Bistümer Reichsitaliens unter den sächsischen und salischen Kaisern: mit den Listen der Bischöfe, 951-1122. (in German) Leipzig: B.G. Teubner. pp. 295–296.
- Tanturri, Alberto (2002), "I primi sinodi postridentini nella diocesi di Valva e Sulmona," (in Italian), in: Campania Sacra 33 (2002), pp. 109 – 138.
- Ughelli, Ferdinando; Coleti, Niccolò (1717). Italia sacra sive De Episcopis Italiae, et insularum adjacentium (in Latin). Vol. Tomus primus (1) (editio secunda, aucta et emendata ed.). Venice: apud Sebastianum Coleti. pp. 1358–1386.

==== External links ====
- "Diocese of Sulmona-Valva" Catholic-Hierarchy.org. David M. Cheney. Retrieved February 29, 2016.
- "Diocese of Sulmona-Valva" GCatholic.org. Gabriel Chow. Retrieved February 29, 2016.
