= Lama dei Peligni =

- Comune
- Comune di Lama dei Peligni
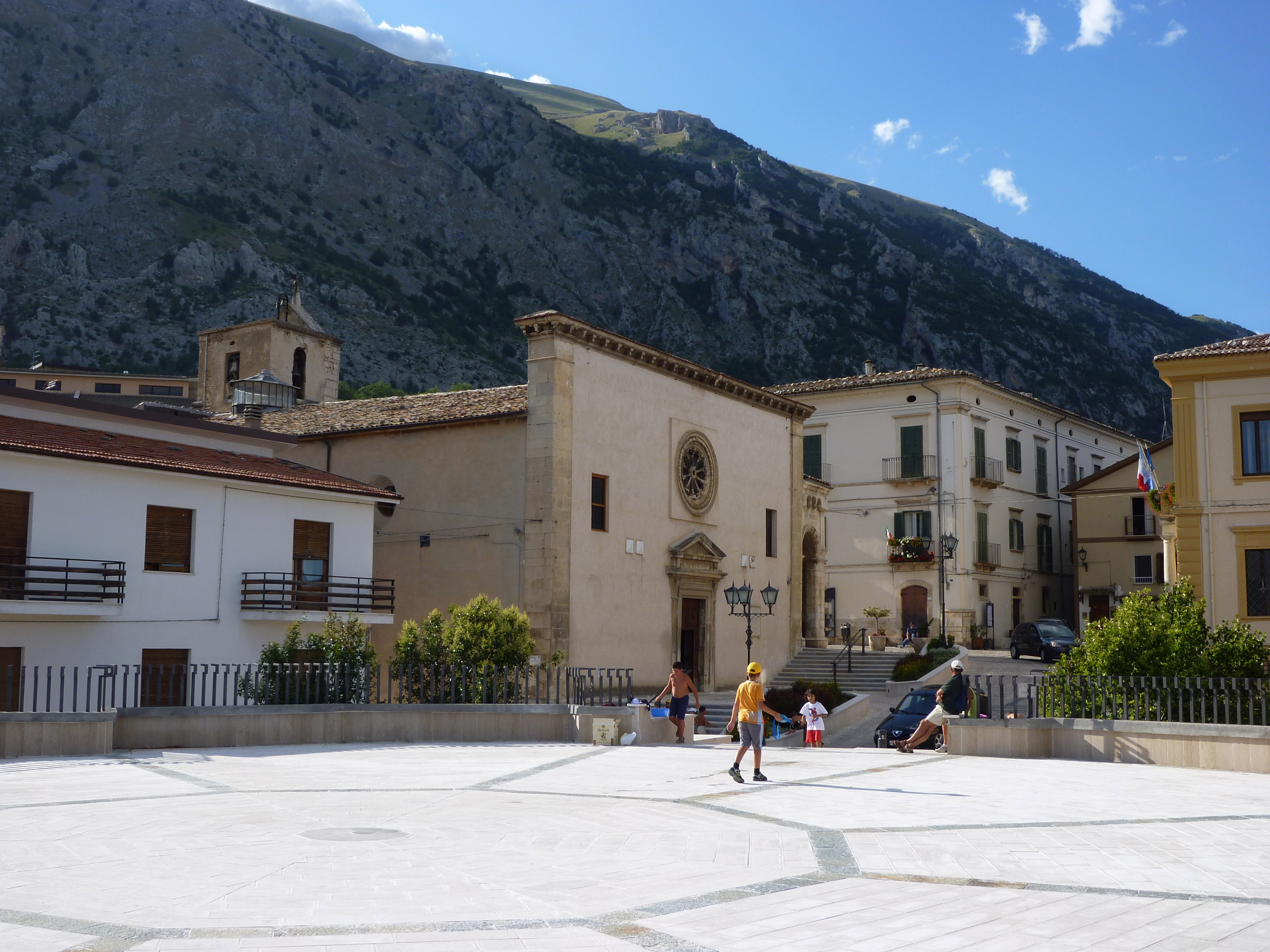

- Location within Italy Location within Abruzzo
- Coordinates: 42°02′30″N 14°11′13″E
- Country: Italy
- Region: Abruzzo
- Province: Chieti (CH)
- Frazioni: Corpi Santi, Fonti Rossi, Piani Marini, Vaccarda

Government
  - Mayor: Antonino Amorosi (since May 2006)

Area
  - Total: 31 km^{2} (12 sq mi)
- Elevation: 669 m (2,195 ft)

Population (2004)
  - Total: 1,478
  - Density: 48/km^{2} (120/sq mi)
- Demonym: Lamesi
- Time zone: UTC+1 (CET)
  - Summer (DST): UTC+2 (CEST)
- Postal code: 66010
- Dialing code: 0872
- Patron saint: St. Sebastiano
- Saint day: 20 January
- Website: Official website

Lama dei Peligni is a comune and town in the province of Chieti in the Abruzzo region of Italy with 1,155 inhabitants. It is also part of the Aventino-Medio Sangro mountain community and the municipal territory is included in the Maiella National Park. The environs of the town is known to naturalists as the natural habitat of chamois, and is in a florofaunal area of particular interest.

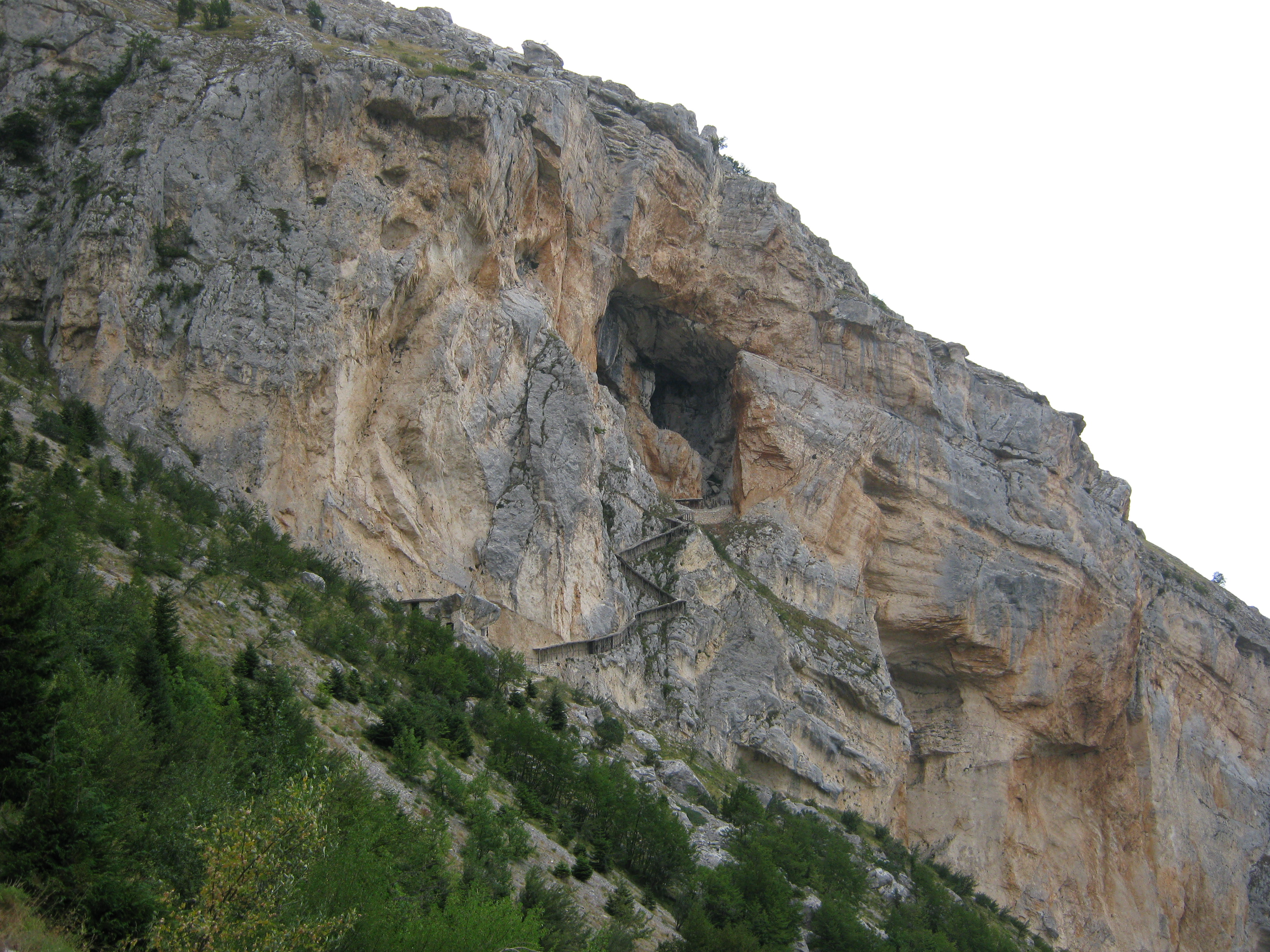
Grotta del Cavallone in Lama dei Peligni

== History ==
The territory has been inhabited since prehistoric, as amply testified by a series of rock paintings found in the caves of the area and from the remains of a village from the Neolithic period. In Contrada Fonterossi, right in the vicinity of the Neolithic site, the so-called "Uomo della Maiella" was found at the beginning of the 20th century, human remains of a prehistoric burial dating back to 7000–5000 BC.

== Name origin ==
The toponym is of pre-Latin derivation, coming from the word lamawhich literally meant 'counterbore', that is, 'land where water stagnates'; the addition referring to the Italic people, the Peligni, which would have gone as far as the territory of the Aventine river, is considered to have come later.

== Geography ==
Located at an altitude of 669 meters, the town is located between the Aventino river and the southern slopes of the Majella massif. To connect the two banks of the river, several bridges were built, which have collapsed except one called the Iron Bridge, built with pieces of wood that were used in railroad track construction. The environment of Lama dei Peligni is varied: it ranges from the lower-elevation area where vast oak forests prevail, passing through the steep rocky crags inhabited by squirrels, roe deer and wild boars, among others, up to the flat areas at high altitude where, for example, the Apennine edelweiss grow.

== Palaces and public monuments ==
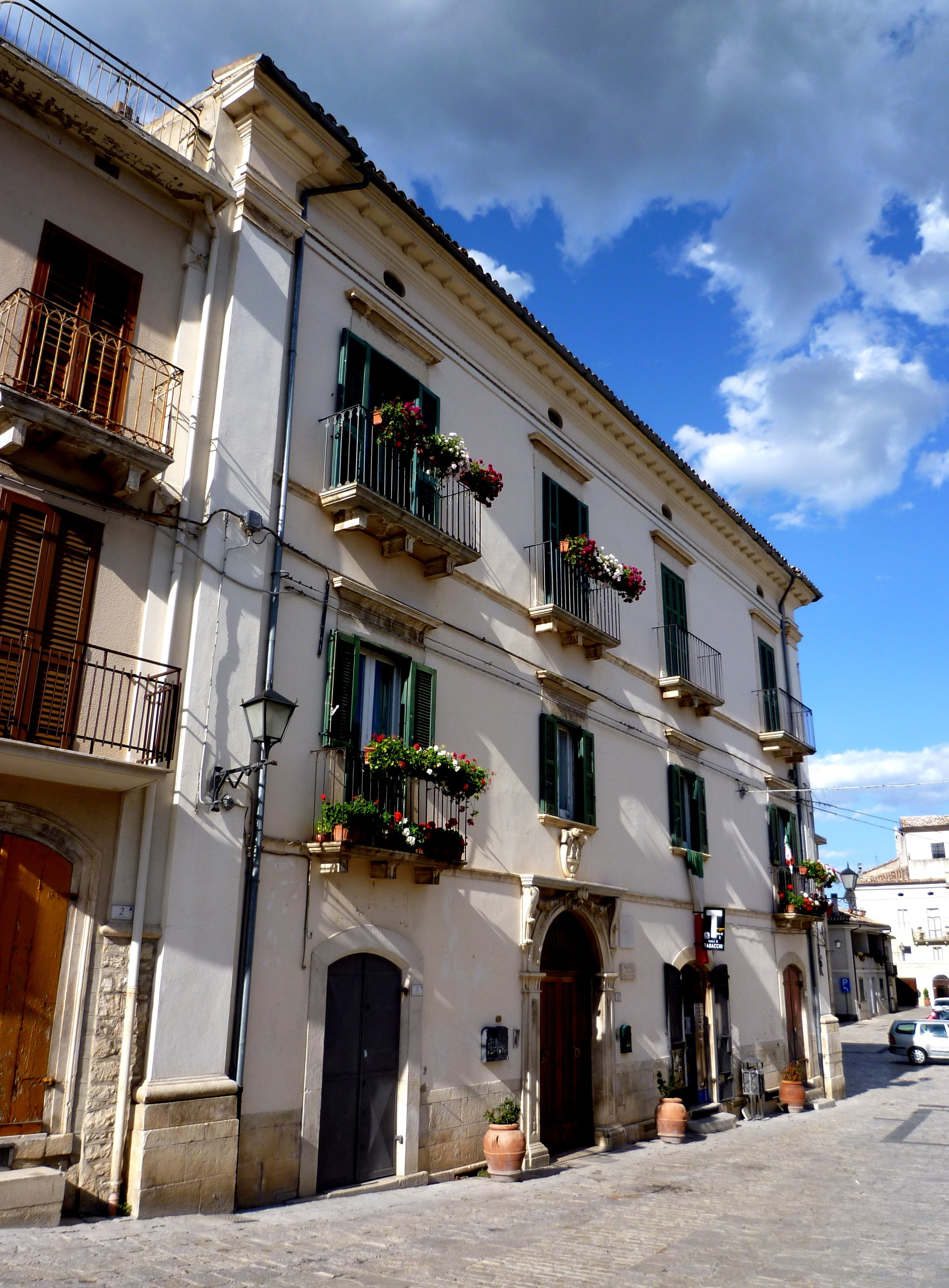
Palace of the Tabassi Barons.

- Verlengia Palace, located in Piazza Umberto I. The presence of a baroque grate suggests that the building is 18th-century. The palace was renovated in the 20th century. Currently the building is only partially inhabited. Where the plaster has fallen off, traces of masonry can be seen. The door also has an exhibition in stone.
- Palace of the Tabassi Barons, located in Piazza Umberto I. The construction dates back to the 16th century; the building has subsequently been renovated and remodeled. The building is on three levels separated by string-course cornices. The main facade has in the corners giant pilasters on which an entablature is placed at the top. The main portal is in stone surmounted by a round arch. Above the frame of the door is the coat of arms of the ducal family. Next to the main portal are three other portals. On the upper floors are windows and balconies with a classical design.
- Ducal Palace, located in Piazza Umberto I. The palace was built at the behest of the Di Capua dukes in Cinquecento. In 1756 the palace was property of the D'Aquino family of Caramanico. Little remains of the original structure except some cantonal stone and a few windows. The building has three levels. The cantonal consists of a pilaster which is surmounted by a circular element supported by shelves. The window placed on a cantonal has a stone exhibition with piers with floral motifs placed on a window sill supported by shelves. The frame on which the entablature ends is supported by several shelves with an acanthus leaf decoration. The facade has a scarp profile.
- The Castle: not much is known about this structure, which is located in the heart of the historic center bordering the village of Lama Vecchia, which has an almost completely collapsed. The castle stands on a hill, hinge between the old Lama and the new one developed in the 17th century, around the current Piazza Umberto I, with the parish of San Nicola and San Clemente. Today ruins of the irregular layout of the castle remain between via Castello and via Forno Vecchio. It seems that before the destruction of the Allies by bombing, the castle was a noble residence: only a watchtower is still preserved today, while around it are the ruins of the walls.
- Monument to the fallen: located near the churchyard of San Pietro, it is a stone obelisk with a square shape which rests on a pedestal. The obelisk is decorated with bronze panels with allegorical scenes, and is dedicated to both the civilian victims of the Second World War and the Lamese partisans of the Maiella Brigade.
- Fonte Cannella: It is located on Via Nazionale Frentana. It is a fountain with three spouts with two rectangular-shaped basins placed on the sides. It was possibly built in the 20th century on an earlier building placed on a spring. The basin has a molded profile and is supported by two scroll-like pedestals. The back wall has a projecting cornice, topped by a higher attic in the central part.

== Caves ==
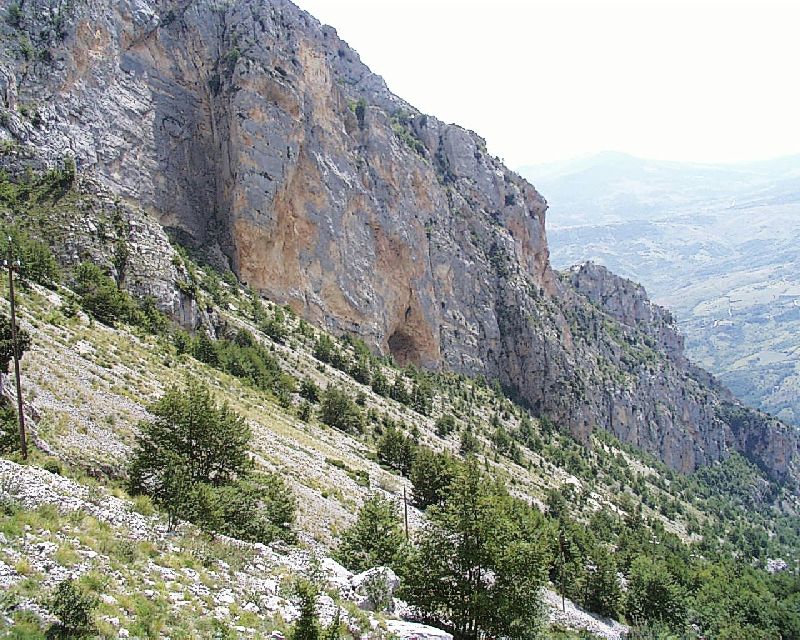
Entrance to the Grotta del Cavallone

- Grotta del Cavallone: located on the border between Lama and Taranta Peligna, known for being the highest accessible natural cave in Europe. The poet Gabriele D'Annunzio set the tragedy The Daughter of Iorio there.
- Grotta Sant'Angelo: the first certain attestation dates back to 1447. In the section on Lama in the Register of Fires of the Kingdom of Naples a certain Margarita concubina prioris Sancti Angeli de monte ('Margherita, concubine of the prior of S. Angelo del Monte') is mentioned. However, the dedication St. Michael the Archangel suggests an early medieval foundation. In 1838 the place was mentioned in the Decrees of the First Holy Visititation by G. M. Saggese, bishop of Chieti. According to a local tradition, in 1656 the rich notary De Camillis took refuge there to escape the plague; a century later, the discovery of a boot full of gold coins caused the destruction of the walls by the locals in search of possible treasure. The structure is as follows: large entrance hall about 20 meters wide at the entrance with a few surviving traces of masonry that allow the original structure to be broadly reconstructed. The front of the cave was entirely closed, with a single access in the center, while the interior was made up of two rooms of different sizes. The first, which still retains the remains of a small altar surmounted by a wooden aedicule, constituted the presbytery area of the complex, as evidenced by the presence of a stoup carved into the rock of the entrance wall; the second room, smaller in size, was the residential core of the hermitage.

== Museums ==
- Maurizio Locati naturalistic archaeological museum: located at the entrance of Lama, coming from Fara San Martino, is a wildlife and archaeological museum dedicated to the zoologist Maurizio Locati, who worked for the reintroduction of chamois in the Majella National Park. Part of the museum is dedicated to the Abruzzo chamois and to the flora and fauna of the Majella, the archaeological section is dedicated to the prehistoric presence of man on the Majella, in particular to the village of Fonte Rissi, in the district of Lama, where utensils and household objects are kept, and also a lapidarium from the Roman era.

== Culture ==
At the Verlengia palace in Piazza Umberto I is the municipal library, dedicated to the philologist and Abruzzese Francesco Verlengia, also director of the provincial library of Chieti. The library contains many of his original manuscripts.

== Literature ==
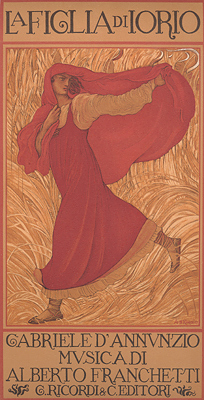
Lithograph for The Daughter of Ioro by Gabriele d'Annunzio

The town is bordered by the village of Taranta Peligna which was chosen by Gabriele d'Annunzio, together with the Grotta del Cavallone, (adjacent To Lama dei Peligni in the Taranta Valley) as the scene of his tragedy The Daughter of Iorio.

== Events ==
- Until 17 January: re-enactment of the temptations of the devil to Saint Anthony the Great.
- 20 January: patronal feast of Saint Sebastian.
- 1st Sunday of May: feast in honor of Our Lady of Sorrows in the Fonterossi district.
- 3rd Sunday of May: canoeing gathering on the Aventine Hill.
- Last Saturday and Sunday of May: feast of the Holy Child of Lama.
- Last week of July: Aventino Blues festival.
- 12–13 August: feast in honor of Saint Anthony.
- Last Saturday and Sunday of August: feast in honor of Saint Martin of Tours in the Fico San Martino district.
- 1st Saturday and Sunday of September: feast in honor of Our Lady of Holy Bodies, in the Corpi Santi District.
- 25–26 December: feast in honor of Santa Barbara.
- 11 August: Music festival by the Cultural Association Festival of Music

== Society ==
=== Demographic evolution ===
The following graph shows the population over time:

Census population
Year	Population
1861	3,011
1871	3,106
1881	3,215
1901	3,580
1911	3,786
1921	3,958
1931	3,008
1936	3,015
1951	2,855
1961	2,458
1971	1,839
1981	1,562
1991	1,515
2001	1,486
2011	1,364
