= La figlia di Iorio =

1906 opera

- Opera by Alberto Franchetti
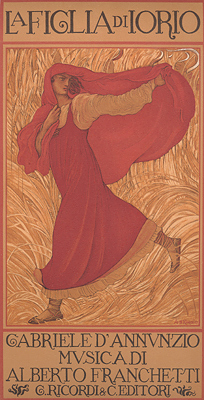
- Poster by Adolfo de Carolis
- Translation: The Daughter of Iorio
- Librettist: Gabriele D'Annunzio
- Language: Italian
- Based on: the librettists's play
- Premiere: 29 March 1906; La Scala, Milan

La figlia di Iorio (The Daughter of Iorio), sometimes written as La figlia di Jorio, is an opera in three acts by Alberto Franchetti to a libretto by Gabriele D'Annunzio. The libretto is a very close rendering of D'Annunzio's play of the same name. La figlia di Iorio premiered at La Scala on 29 March 1906, conducted by Leopoldo Mugnone. Although the play, which had premiered two years earlier, was considered one of D'Annunzio's greatest works, the opera did not achieve a comparable success and has been rarely performed since its day.

== Roles ==
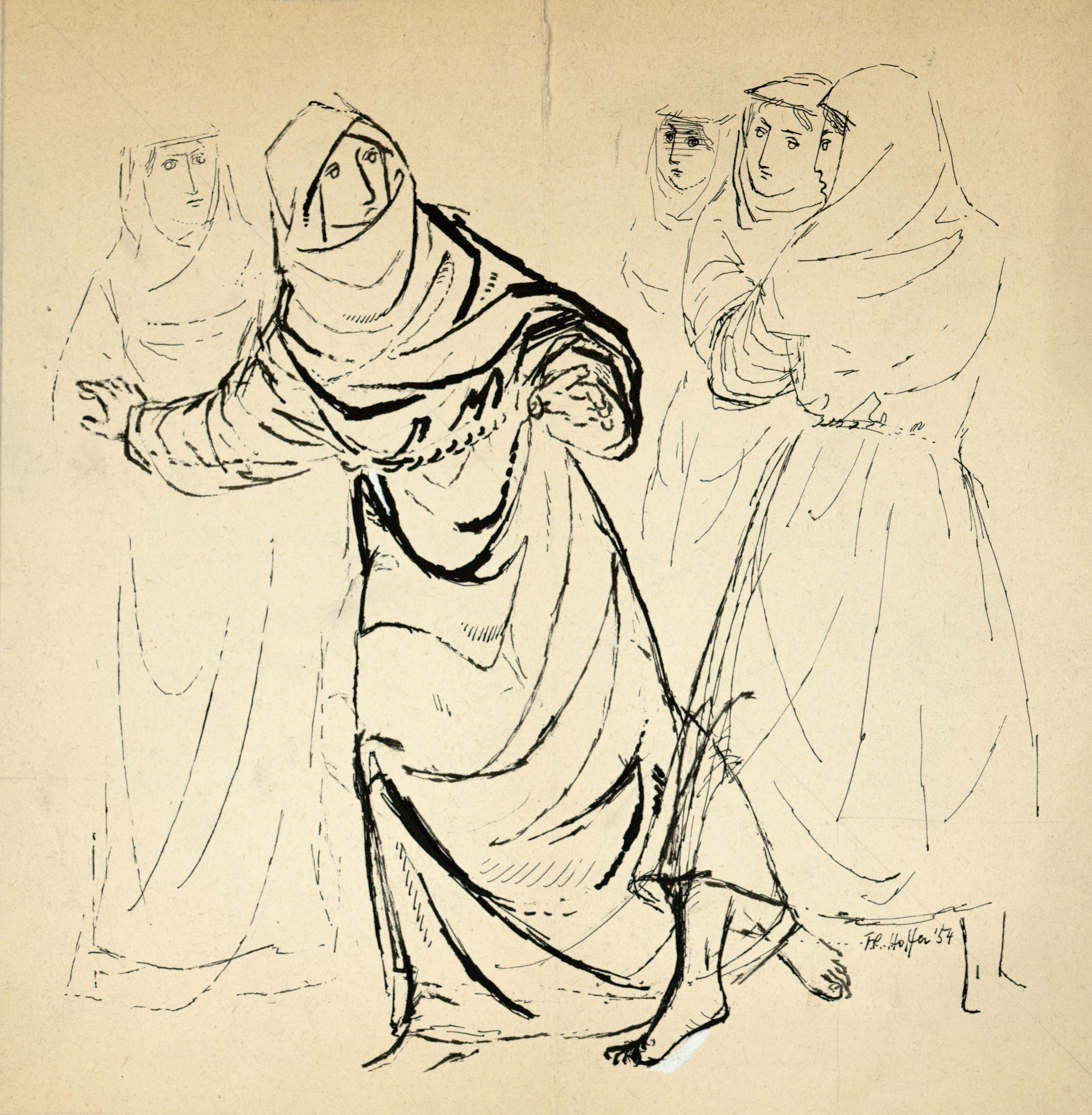
Drawing by Peter Hoffer for the 1954 edition of the libretto

Role	Voice type	Premiere cast 29 March 1906
Aligi	tenor	Giovanni Zenatello
Candia della Leonessa	mezzo-soprano	Eleonora de Cisneros
Crocifero	bass	Libero Ottoboni
Favetta	mezzo-soprano	Maria Bastia Pagnoni
Ienne dell'Eta	bass	Mansueto Gaudio
Lazaro di Roio	baritone	Eugenio Giraldoni
Mielitore	bass	Adamo Didur
Mila di Codra	soprano	Angelica Pandolfini
Ornella	soprano	Adele D'Albert
Splendore	soprano	Teresina Ferraris

== Synopsis ==
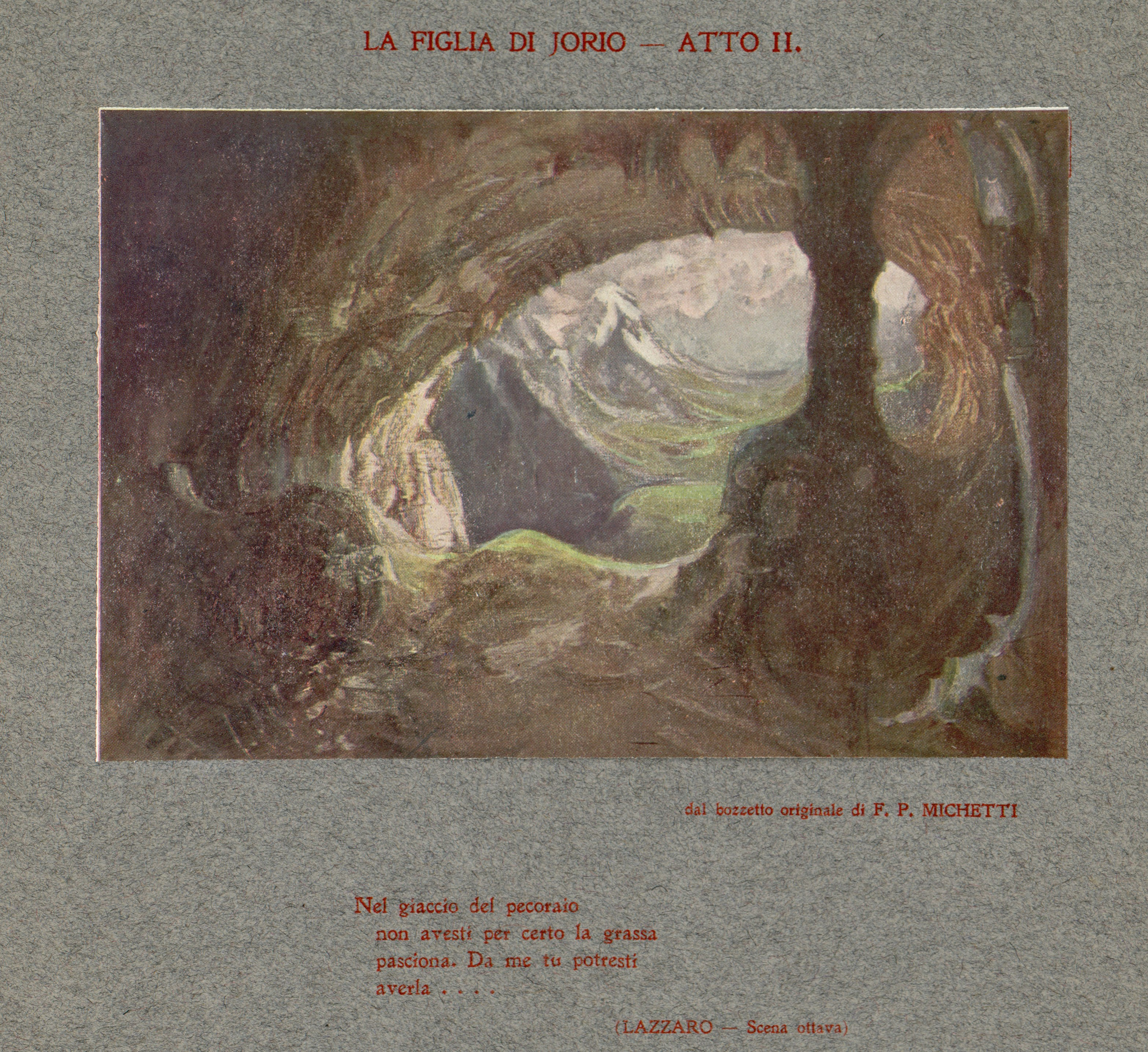
Set design of the cave from Act II

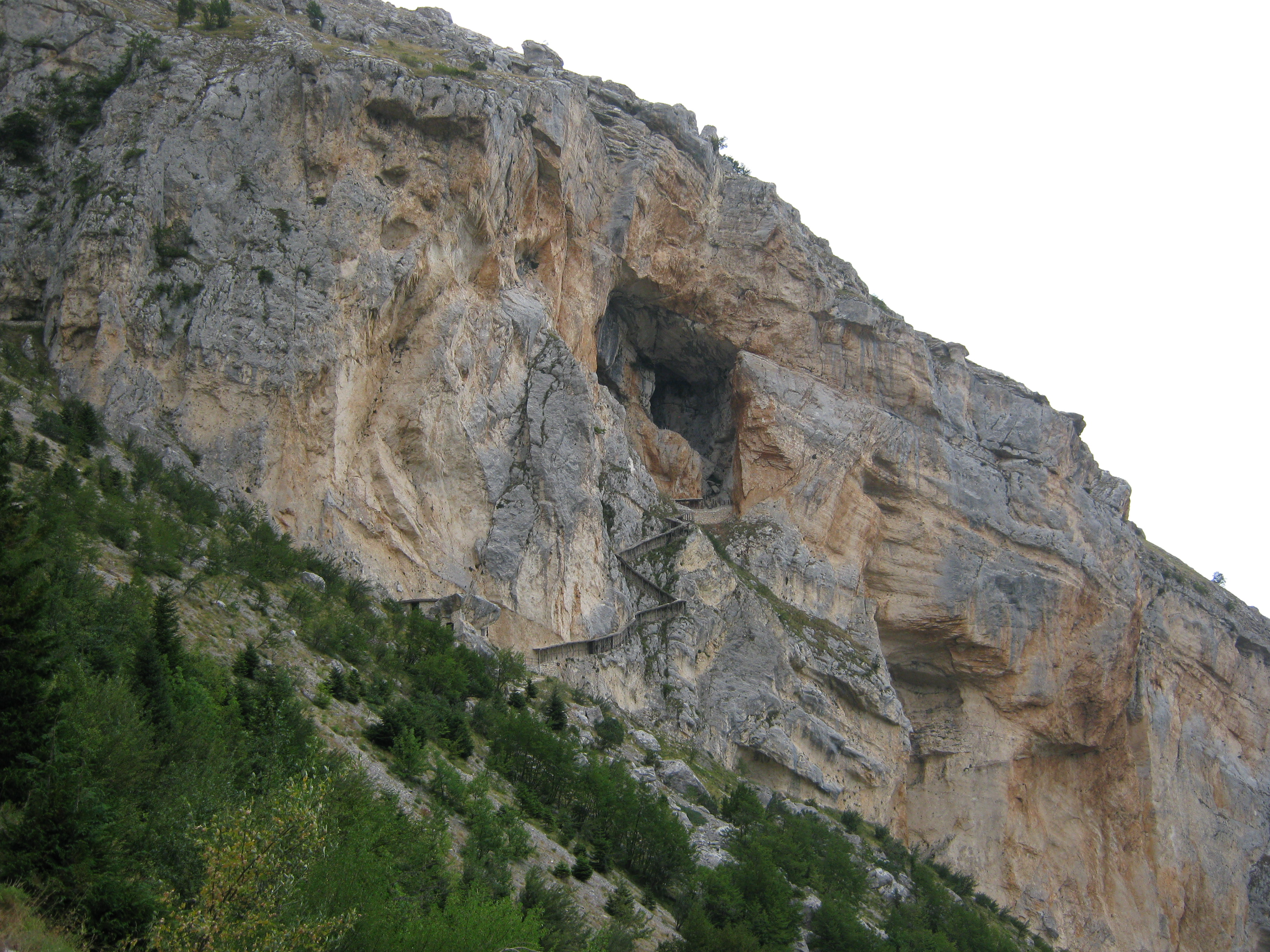
Grotta del Cavallone in Lama dei Peligni

The story is set in the small town in Abruzzo: Lama dei Peligni. Near the Grotta del Cavallone, lives a wealthy family in decline: the Sangro of Roio del Sangro. The father Lazaro di Roio is happy because his young son Aligi is getting married with a rich woman of the country. However the wedding is interrupted by the inhabitants of Lama, enraged against a girl. The girl named Mila is accused by the superstitions of the people of being a witch, and so is likely to be sentenced to death. Aligi chases people away, because he is in love with her. So the young man breaks the marriage and Lazaro curses him away. Aligi and Mila go to live in exile in the Cave, hated by all the people, and plan to leave the country. Aligi but is too poor and so he travels to Rome to appeal to the pope. When he returns confident, Aligi discovers that the inhabitants of Lama Peligni burned alive Mila during his absence.

== Recordings ==
- Souvenirs from Verismo Operas, Volume 1, International Record Collectors' Club (IRCC 812) contains an aria and duet from La figlia di Iorio with two singers from the original cast:
  - "Che c'è egli, Aligi!" sung by Eugenio Giraldoni and Giovanni Zenatello (Fonotipia 1906)
  - "Rinverdisca per noi" sung by Giovanni Zenatello (Fonotipia 1906)
- La figlia di Iorio, a live recording from the 1988 performance of the opera at the Teatro del Vittoriale, Gardone Riviera with Enrico De Mori conducting the Orchestra e Coro della Città di Verona, was released in 2010 on the Inscena/Opera suite label

== Notes and references ==
- Rosenthal, Harold and John Warrack. (1979, 2nd ed.). The Concise Oxford Dictionary of Opera. London, New York and Melbourne: Oxford University Press. p. 168. ISBN 0-19-311318-X.
- Gelli, Piero (ed.), 'Figlia di Jorio, La', Dizionario dell'Opera, 2005, Milan: Baldini Castoldi Dalai, ISBN 88-8490-780-2.
- "D'Annunzio, Gabriele", Encyclopædia Britannica, 2007. Retrieved November 7, 2007, from Encyclopædia Britannica Online
