= Marie Engle =

American operatic soprano (c. 1860–1953)

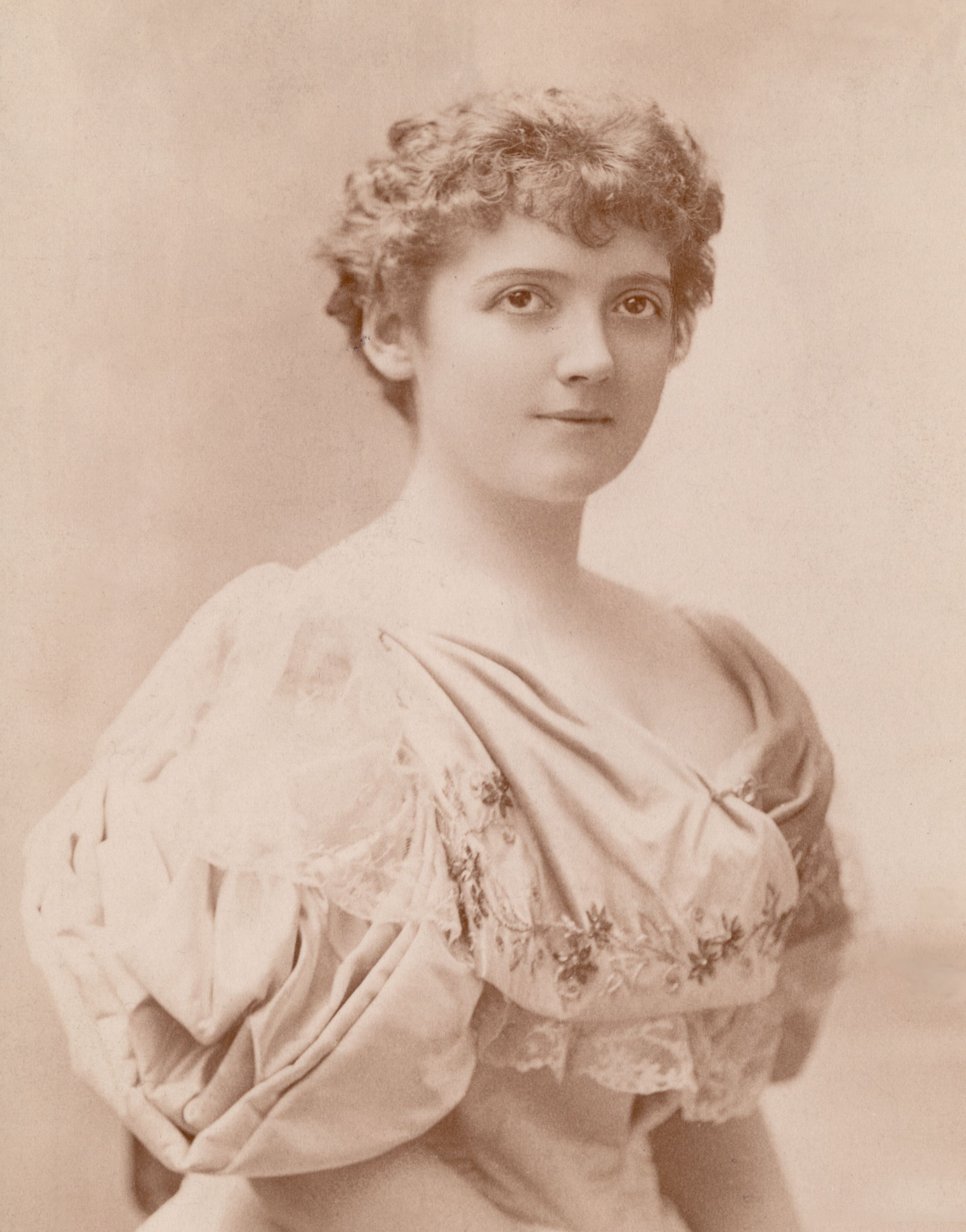
- Engle in 1895
- Born: c. 1860; Chicago, Illinois, US
- Died: 1953; Southsea, Portsmouth, England
- Occupation: Operatic soprano
- Known for: Early recording by Gianni Bettini

Marie Engle (c. 1860 – 1953) was an American operatic soprano who performed in the United States and Europe in the late 19th century. She was a student of Adelina Murio-Celli d'Elpeux, first performing at the Academy of Music in New York. Engle made her debut at the Grand Opera House in San Francisco with the Mapleson Opera Company in 1886, followed by Covent Garden in London the next year. She also appeared at Drury Lane under the management of Augustus Harris.

After marrying theater manager Gustav Amburg, she retired for a time, returning in the mid-1890s to perform at the Metropolitan Opera and later at the Teatro Real. Critics generally praised her stage presence and technical expertise. Selections of her work were recorded by Gianni Bettini as part of the first phonograph cylinders of opera singers ever offered for sale in a catalog. Towards the end of her career, she performed in the first full, uncut American premiere of Wagner's Der Ring des Nibelungen in 1899. She retired that same year for a final time to take care of her sick father, leaving the United States for England after his death.

== Early life ==
Engle was born around 1860 in Chicago, Illinois, (Note: Contemporary news articles and biographies of Engle report that she was a "native of Chicago" or "born and raised" in Chicago or "born in Chicago". In the 1870 census, she was recorded as born in Illinois and her 1889 marriage record similarly reports a birth in Chicago, Illinois.) where she was raised with one brother, Charles. Her father, Christian Engle, came to the United States and settled in Michigan. Christian's father was from Prussia, and his mother was the French prima donna Marie Stoll. Christian later married Augusta Merrill, a singer of Irish and English heritage. Augusta died when Marie was young, but before her death, she requested her daughter to sing for her.

Her father was a successful brewer in St. Louis and later worked as a private secretary for Albert Allison Munger, heir to the Wesley Munger grain elevator company. Engle's father also helped plan her musical education. She studied under several teachers including Anna Frederika Magnusson Jewett and Adelina Murio-Celli d'Elpeux. At age 14, Engle performed at the Academy of Music in New York. Before her marriage, she was accompanied by her father on tour for most of her career.

== Career ==
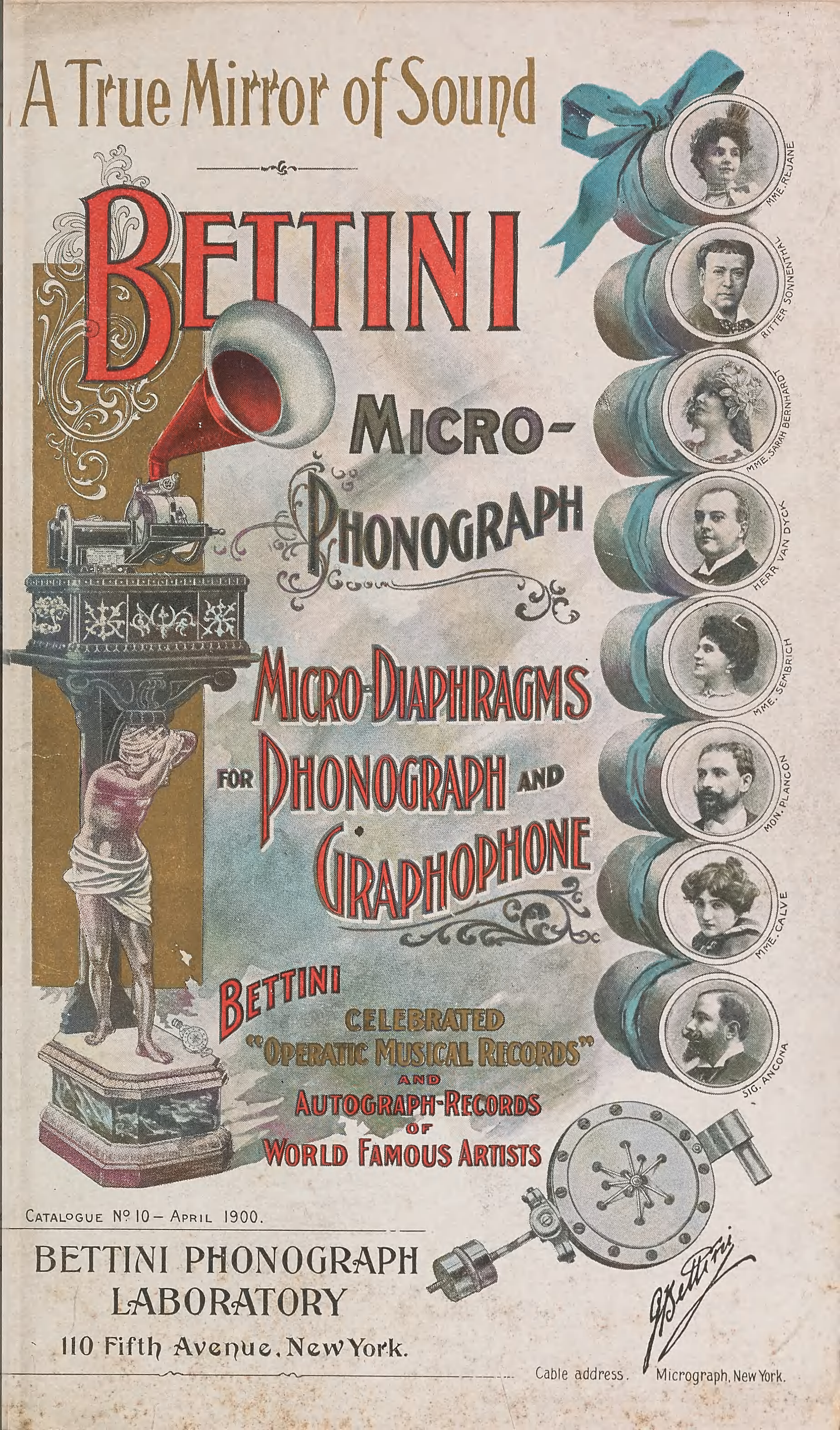
A surviving copy of a Bettini music catalog, 1900. A recording of Engle singing appears for sale in the 1897 and 1898 catalogs.

James Henry Mapleson heard Engle perform at the Academy and took her under his management. She debuted in 1886 at the Grand Opera House in San Francisco as Philine in Mignon by Ambroise Thomas. The following year she made her debut in London, appearing at Covent Garden as Zerlina in Mozart's Don Giovanni. That same year, she also appeared at Drury Lane under the management of Augustus Harris, where she performed as the Queen in Meyerbeer's Les Huguenots, Adalgisa in Bellini's Norma, and Cherubino in Mozart's Le nozze di Figaro.

She debuted at the Metropolitan Opera in 1895, appearing as Micaëla in Bizet's Carmen and Baucis in Gounod's Philémon et Baucis. She returned to Covent Garden in London again that year and the next, receiving positive but mixed reviews. One critic noted that her 1895 performance was enjoyable and well received, but thought Engle's vocal resources were limited as a prima donna, though still impressive overall. The following year, she appeared again in Philémon et Baucis and in an English language version of Humperdinck's Hansel and Gretel. One critic offered praise and affirmation of her skill in her role as Baucis, describing her performance as lively, cheerful, and highly competent.

Three years later, Engle appeared at the Teatro Real in 1898, an event widely covered in the newspapers of the time. Just several months after the sinking of the Maine and only weeks before the outbreak of the Spanish–American War, Engle performed as Ophelia in Hamlet by Thomas. Due to the political situation, she received a chilly reception from an unforgiving and hypercritical Spanish audience. In the opening act, there was no reaction at all to her performance, only silence. By the second act, shouts of "Americana" began, followed by hissing, which continued until the final act. Despite the poor reception, she managed to win the audience over to loud cheers and approval by the end.

Under the direction of Maurice Grau, Engle took the stage in three grand opera productions during the winter of 1898 at Chicago's Auditorium Theatre: as Cherubino, Lady Harriet Durham in an Italian version of Flotow's Martha, and the Queen in Les Huguenots. Beginning in January of the following year, Engle performed in the first full, uncut American premiere of Wagner's Ring cycle, also under the direction of Grau, at the Metropolitan Opera.

== Personal life ==
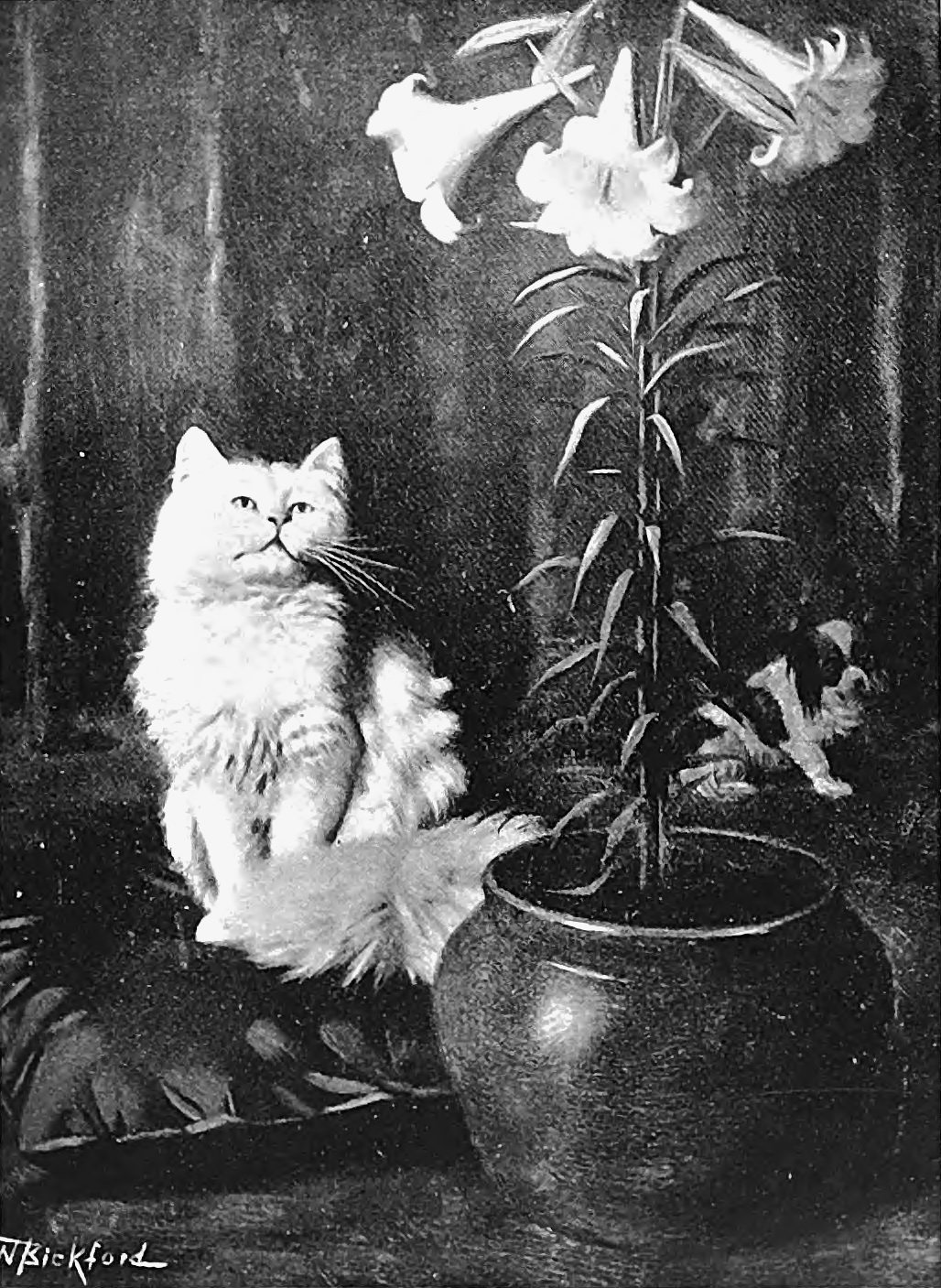
Engle's cat "Mizzi", as depicted by Nelson Norris Bickford in the painting Kitty's Birthday (n.d.)

Engle married her manager, Gustav Amburg, then in charge of the Bowery Theatre, in 1889. During their marriage, she was frequently occupied with preparing for performances or touring. Amburg was abusive towards her, making their relationship difficult. At the demand of her husband, she temporarily retired from the opera.

At this time, Engle cared for a white Angora cat named Mizzi. Writer Carl Van Vechten made note of Engle's interest in cats in his essay on cats in music. Mizzi the cat was immortalized in the painting Kitty's Birthday by artist Nelson Norris Bickford, who later adopted the cat from Engle as his own. The painting gained popularity through journalist Helen M. Winslow's book Concerning Cats (1900).

Engle divorced Amburg in 1896 after learning he had a second wife in Germany. She spoke about her work in several interviews, noting that it was a difficult career. "We cannot all win, to be sure", she told one reporter, "and the few who attain success well deserve it." She ended her opera career for a final time to care for her ill father in Michigan, who died in 1899. She was later said to have converted to Catholicism. In 1912, The New York Times reported that Engle was living in Brighton. She died in 1953 at the age of 92 in Southsea, a suburb of Portsmouth, England.

== Reception ==
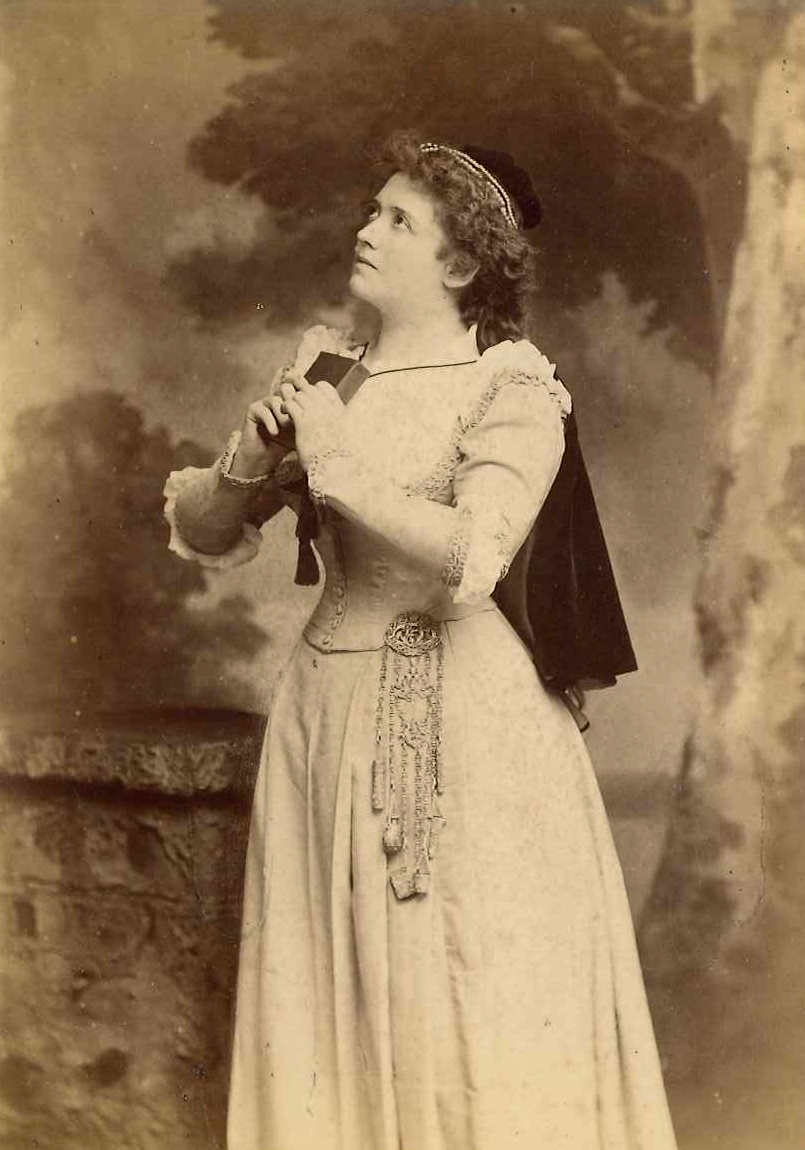
Engle by Elliott & Fry, 1890

Engle frequently performed alongside the leading singers of her time and was regarded as part of a peer group that included Emma Eames, Lillian Nordica, and Suzanne Adams. Music critic William Armstrong later remarked that Engle was once considered one of the most beautiful opera singers of her time, as well as technically proficient. During her career, critical reviews noted that her voice was not known for its projection or its timbral richness, but rather for its clean tone, precise intonation, and effortless agility, and for her unique approach to the lyric coloratura, in particular her ability to execute trills. Another reviewer wrote that Engle was "gifted with considerable personal attraction, a beautiful mezzo-soprano organ, and a singularly correct ear."

== Bettini cylinders ==
In the late 1890s, the problem of acoustic cylinder duplication was solved with the pantograph, allowing phonograph cylinders to be copied and sold. Gianni Bettini produced some of the first opera recordings for commercial release at the Bettini Phonograph Laboratory in the Judge Building on Fifth Avenue, including some by Engle. Bettini made Engle's recordings available for wider purchase through his catalog, making her voice one of the earliest to be commercially recorded and sold to home listeners. She was listed as artist No. 21 in the 1897 and 1898 Bettini catalog, which offered a recording of her singing the Polonaise ("Je suis Titania") from Mignon priced at $3.50 ($135.45 in 2025). Bettini cylinders are considered rare; about 300 survive.
