= Taranta Peligna =

- Comune
- Comune di Taranta Peligna
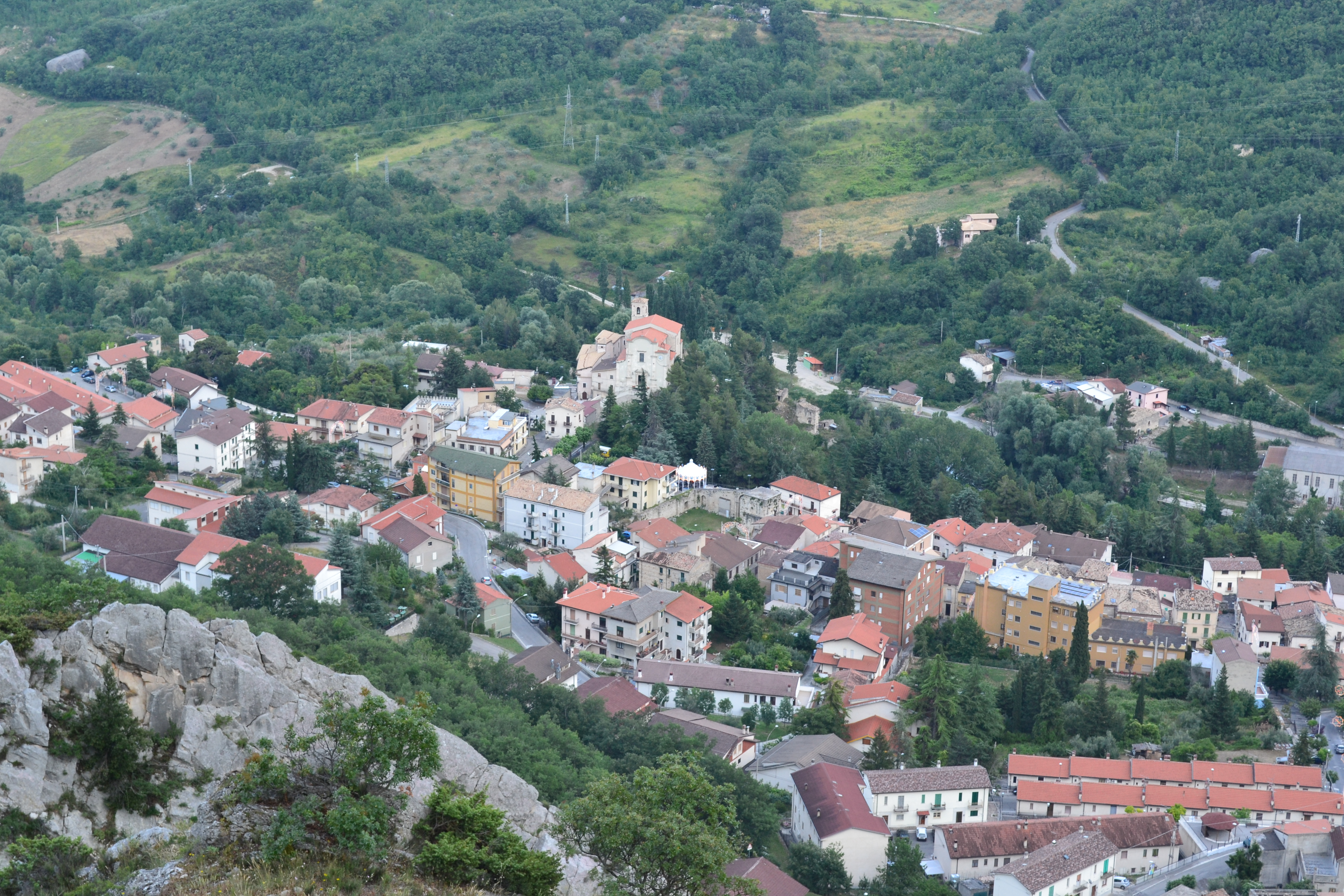

- Location within Italy Location within Abruzzo
- Coordinates: 42°01′N 14°10′E
- Country: Italy
- Region: Abruzzo
- Province: Chieti (CH)
- Frazioni: Ortole

Government
  - Mayor: Marcello Di Martino (since June 2009)

Area
  - Total: 21 km^{2} (8.1 sq mi)
- Elevation: 460 m (1,510 ft)

Population (2004)
  - Total: 280
  - Density: 13/km^{2} (35/sq mi)
- Demonym: Tarantolesi
- Time zone: UTC+1 (CET)
  - Summer (DST): UTC+2 (CEST)
- Postal code: 66018
- Dialing code: 0872
- Patron saint: St. Ubaldo
- Website: Official website

Taranta Peligna (Abruzzese: La Taranta) is a comune and town in the province of Chieti in the Abruzzo region of central Italy. It is 57 kilometres (35 mi) from Chieti.

Located in the Aventino Valley, at the foot of the Maiella, in the past it was famous for its industry of woolen cloth called "taranta", a still thriving activity.

== History ==
Taranta Peligna has inhabited since prehistoric times as evidenced by the discovery of a bronze axe from the first half of the 2nd millennium BC. In the 11th century it was a fief of the Counts of Sangro, if in 1065 Count Borrello son of Borrello and his son Borrello Infante donated to Bishop Attone, then Lord of Chieti, the Church of San Pietro di Taranta (now gone). In 12th century it was mentioned as Tarantam when it was a fief of a soldier run by the Manerius de Palena, a follower of Bohemund, count of Manoppello, while in the 13th century it was owned by Berardo of Acciano and Henry of Portella. Instead, in 1316 Niccolò di Acciano owned half of the town, then bought a sixth part from Roberto Morello and Berardo di Lama, then, in the fifteenth century the municipality was a fief of Caldora and in the 18th century it was D'Aquino. Meanwhile, over the years the country is mentioned in some tenths due to some clericals and churches, while in 1568, a tombstone with an epigraph in Latin is found. Later, in 1943, during World War II the country was almost completely destroyed by the Germans, causing massive emigration. The Maiella earthquake of 1706 claimed 100 lives; this was followed by one in 1915 and another in 1933 and, finally, one in 1984. In addition, in 1929 there was a flood of the Aventine River, when the river destroyed many houses and redesigned the path of the river itself.

During World War II, German supreme commander in Italy Albert Kesselring ordered the population to leave the town on October 26, 1943, as Taranta was across the Gustav Line. The same happened with neighboring Lettopalena. During an Allied bombing, the entire church of San Biagio was blown up.

== Geography ==
Taranta Peligna rises in the valley of the upper Aventine river, on the slopes of the eastern Majella. The urban center initially arose on Le Ripe of the river, and then expanded in a more open position on the detrital cone of the valley. In the territory there are the fluvial oasis of the Acquevive and la luggett, remains of a conduit carved into the living rock.

== Main sights ==
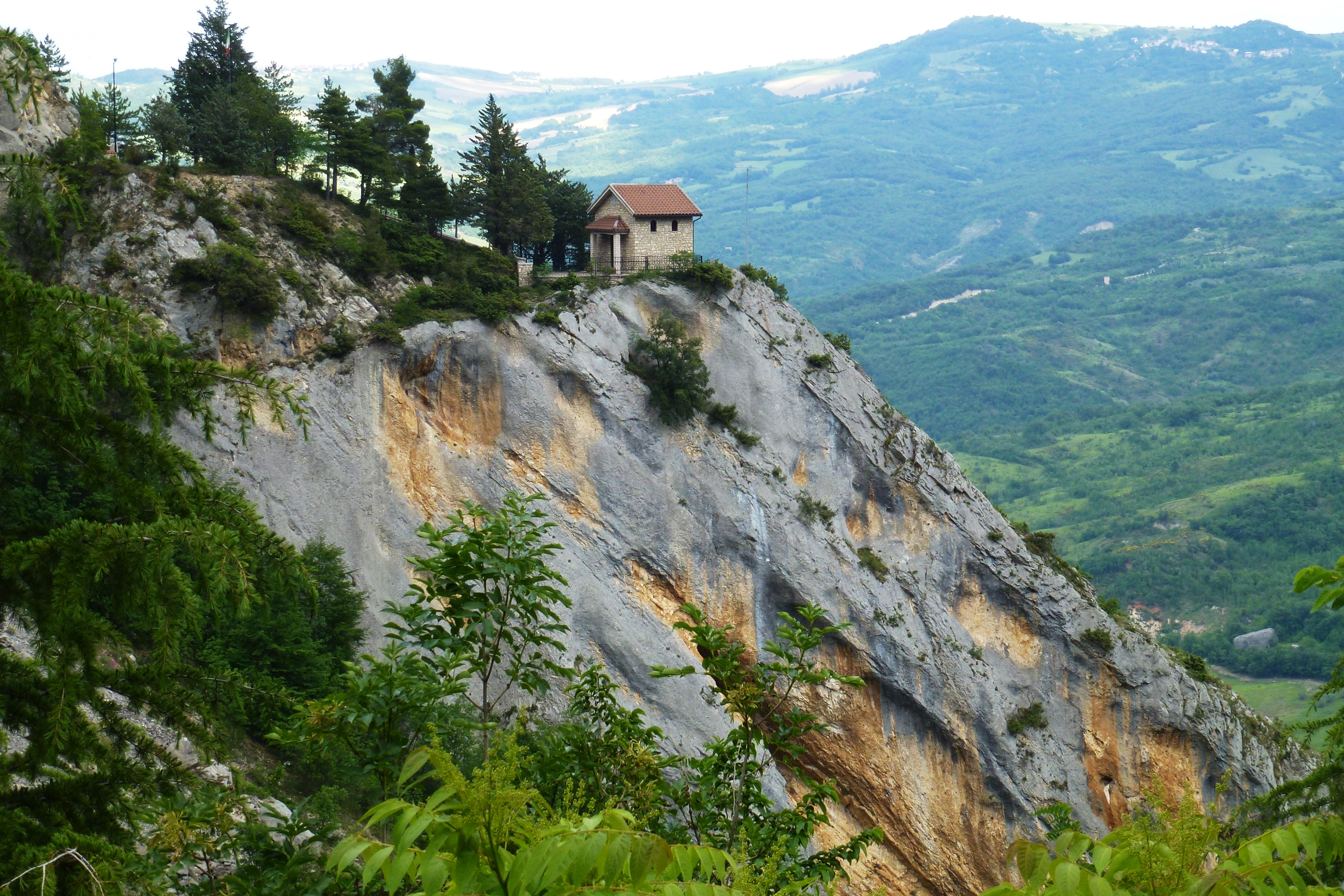
Military shrine of Brigata Maiella.

- Church of Our Lady of Carmine: the small church, built in the nineteenth century, but extensively rebuilt in the twentieth century, stands on the granite rock of the Rocchetta. It has recently been restored by Dr. Giuseppe Recchione, whose family has always been very devoted to Our Lady of Carmine. The church is located on the eastern side of Via Duca degli Abruzzi. It is an exposed mountain stone temple, with a rectangular plan, a gabled ceiling and sloping roof, a simple façade with a small sloping narthex, and a bell-gable.
- Military Shrine of the Maiella Brigade: located on a rocky outcrop stretched like a balcony over the village. It is a chapel dedicated to the 55 fallen of the Majella Brigade, a unique partisan formation that has been awarded a gold medal for military valor despite not being a military formation.
- The Tagliata, the ancient name of the Taranta Valley, is a fissure that cuts deeply into the eastern slope of the Majella for over seven kilometers. It originates at the Sella del Macellaro (2646 m), a small depression located between Mount Macellaro and the Canosa cave. The valley offers a natural environment that includes karst phenomena, botanical rarities and particular fauna. There are numerous cavities such as the Donkey Cave, the Bove cave and the Cavallone tourist cave, reachable by a cable car system. Very popular in summer is an ideal place for hiking, the Macchia di Taranta hut (1703 m) facilitates excursions to the Colle d'Acquaviva (2200 m), Mount Macellaro (2646 m), the Stincone Altar (2426 m) and the farthest Mount Amaro (2793 m), the second highest peak in the Apennines.

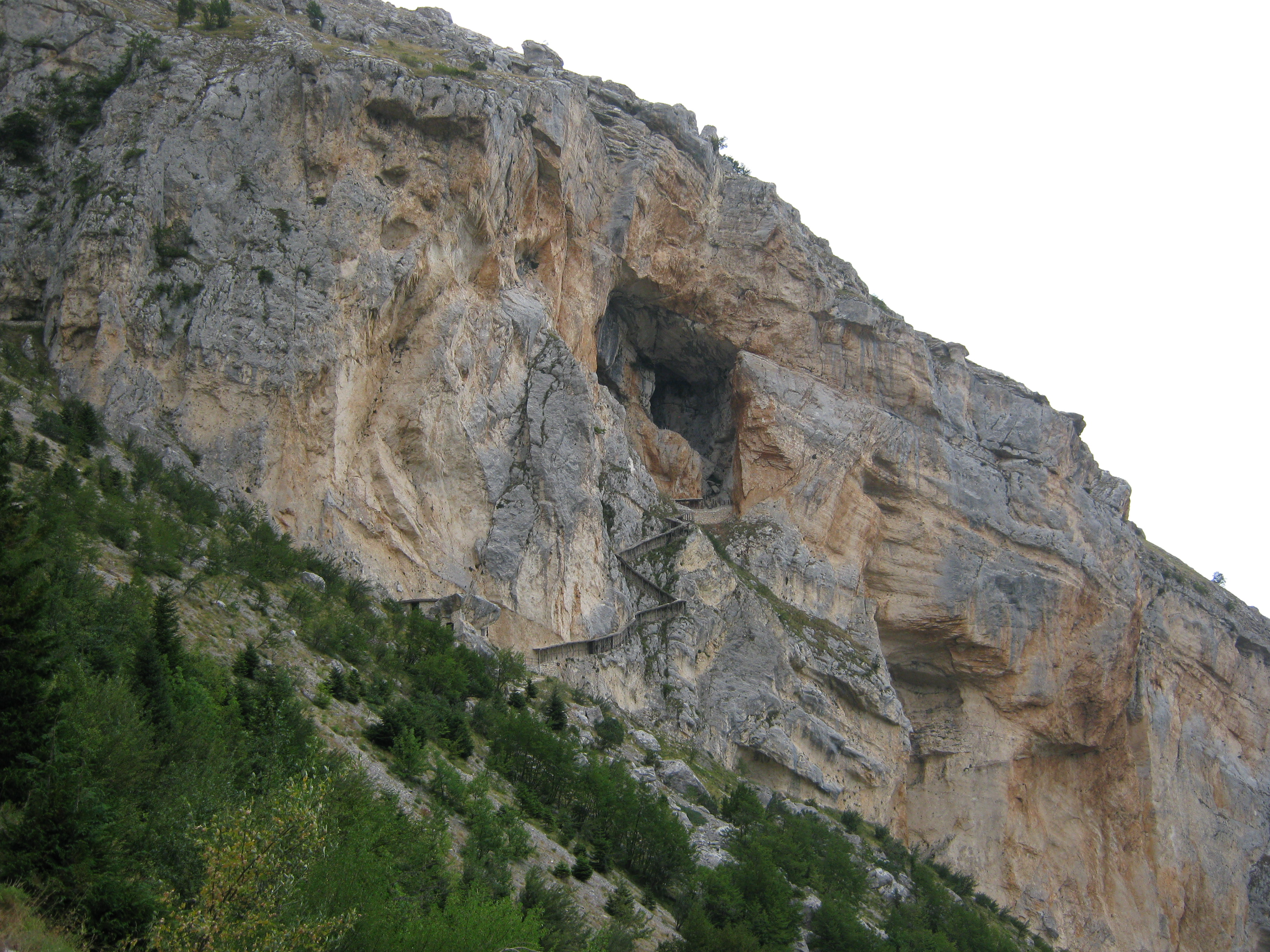
Entrance to Grotta del Cavallone.

- The Grotta del Cavallone opens onto the overhang of the rock face located on the left side of the Taranta Valley at an altitude of 1475 and extends over 1400 meters. Rich in concretionary formations, it offers visions of great suggestion.

From the base the opening is similar to a large bird's nest; the grandeur and impressiveness of the entrance on the fantastic wall is striking. The cave consists of a series of conduits and concrectioned rooms, equipped for tourist visits for about 800 meters, whose topography is largely governed by characters of D'Annunzio's tragedy The daughter of Iorio and more or less happy similarities. It is also called Grotta della figlia di Iorio ('Cave of the Daughter of Iorio') because Francesco Paolo Michetti took inspiration from the entrance cave for the scenography of the second act of D'Annunzio's tragedy that was staged at the Teatro Lirico in Milan on March 4, 1904; and in the wake of the success of the vates' work, the cave attracted numerous visitors and scholars, many of whom described it in imaginative terms and rich in inspired metaphors.

- The Canosa Cave is a cavity is a shelter under rock at an altitude of 2604 meters, between the valley of Femmina Morta and the Cannella valley, clearly visible from afar and a point of convergence of some routes to Mount Amaro. The neighboring municipalities of Taranta Peligna, Lama dei Peligni and Pacentro chose it as the boundary of their respective territories.
