= Adelina Murio-Celli d'Elpeux =

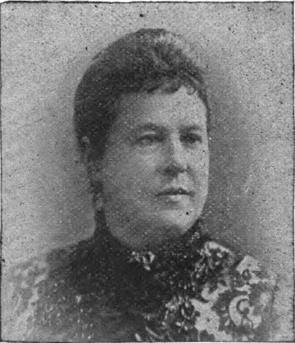
- Adelina Murio-Celli d'Elpeux (1895)

Background information
- Born: 1844; Breslau, Kingdom of Prussia
- Died: April 1900 (aged 55–56) New York City, New York, U.S.
- Genre: Opera
- Occupations: Singer, music teacher, composer

Adelina Murio-Celli d'Elpeux (1844, Breslau – April 10, 1900, New York City) was a Prussian opera singer, music teacher and composer.

== Biography ==
Murio-Celli was born in Breslau of Franco-Russian parents, and went to Paris with them when she was two years old. When Murio-Celli was 15 years old, she won a prize for singing at the Paris Conservatoire. Arditi then took her on operatic tours, and she sang in Italy, Spain, France, Austria, and Turkey, under his management. Murio-Celli went to Mexico, and was the prima donna in Mexico City during the reign of Maximilian I of Mexico. After his execution, Murio-Celli moved to Havana, and then to the United States, where she became the prima donna of the Grau Opera-Company.

In 1870, Murio-Celli retired from singing and began teaching music in Chicago. She married Ravin d'Elpeux, the French consul in Chicago. In 1880, they moved to New York. She died April 10, 1900, at her home, New York, of pneumonia.

Murio-Celli had many notable pupils including Marie Engle, Emma Juch, Minnie Dilthey, Charlotte Walker, Marie Groebl, Anna Russell, Jennie Dickerson, Ida Klein, Amanda Fabris, Emma Abbott, Sallie Reber, Dorothy Morton. Alice M. Whitacre, Sophie Neuberger, Kate Von Arnheim. Pauline Maurel, Helen Bertram, Helen Parepa, Ada Gleason, Rozella Einstein, Cora Cahn, Lena Jones, Rose Gumper, Elfrida Neuberger, Mabel Van Kirk, Nella Bergen, Marguerite Lemon, E. L. D. Ronan. Cora Bedell. Helen Marie Howe. Mildred Mead, Alice Thurlow, Beatrice Roderick, Emma A. Dambmann, Ada M. Austen, Eleanore Broadfoot, Charlotte Steele, Mrs. August William Hoffmann and the Misses Demmer, Roderick. Genoris, Harkness, Head, Detmar, Hyde, Hoffman and Nemerca.

Murio-Celli's compositions included "Il Sogno" (a waltz song), "Mid Starry Deeps of Splendor", the "Soldier’s Bride", and "In-cantatrice", a vocal theme and variations written expressly for Adelina Patti.
