= Grotta del Cavallone =

Cave in province of Chieti, Italy

Grotta del Cavallone (Cavallone Cave)
- Grotta della Figlia di Jorio
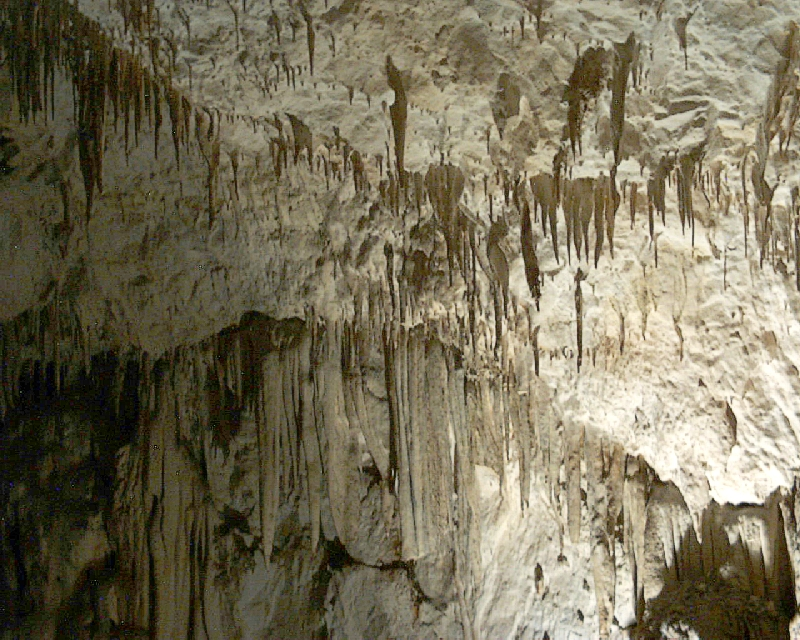
- Stalactites in Cavallone Cave

- Location within Italy
- Location: Lama dei Peligni and Taranta Peligna (CH, Abruzzo, Italy)
- Coordinates: 42°02′20″N 14°09′17″E
- Elevation: 1,300 m
- Discovery: 1704
- Geology: Karst cave
- Entrances: 1
- Access: Public
- Show cave length: 1,000 m
- Website: Official website

The Grotta del Cavallone, also known as the Grotta della Figlia di Jorio, is a cave located near Lama dei Peligni in Taranta Peligna, in the province of Chieti, Abruzzo, Italy. It is open during the warmer months; an admission fee is charged.

== Overview ==
The cave lies within the mountains of the Majella National Park, and is accessed via cable car. The cave is 10–20 meters wide and nearly the same height throughout, with numerous speleothems including stalagmites, flowstone, and rimstone pools. It has electric lighting with rough paths, concrete steps, and iron bridges.

Gabriele D'Annunzio employed the cave in the first act of his tragedy "La figlia di Iorio".

== Gallery ==
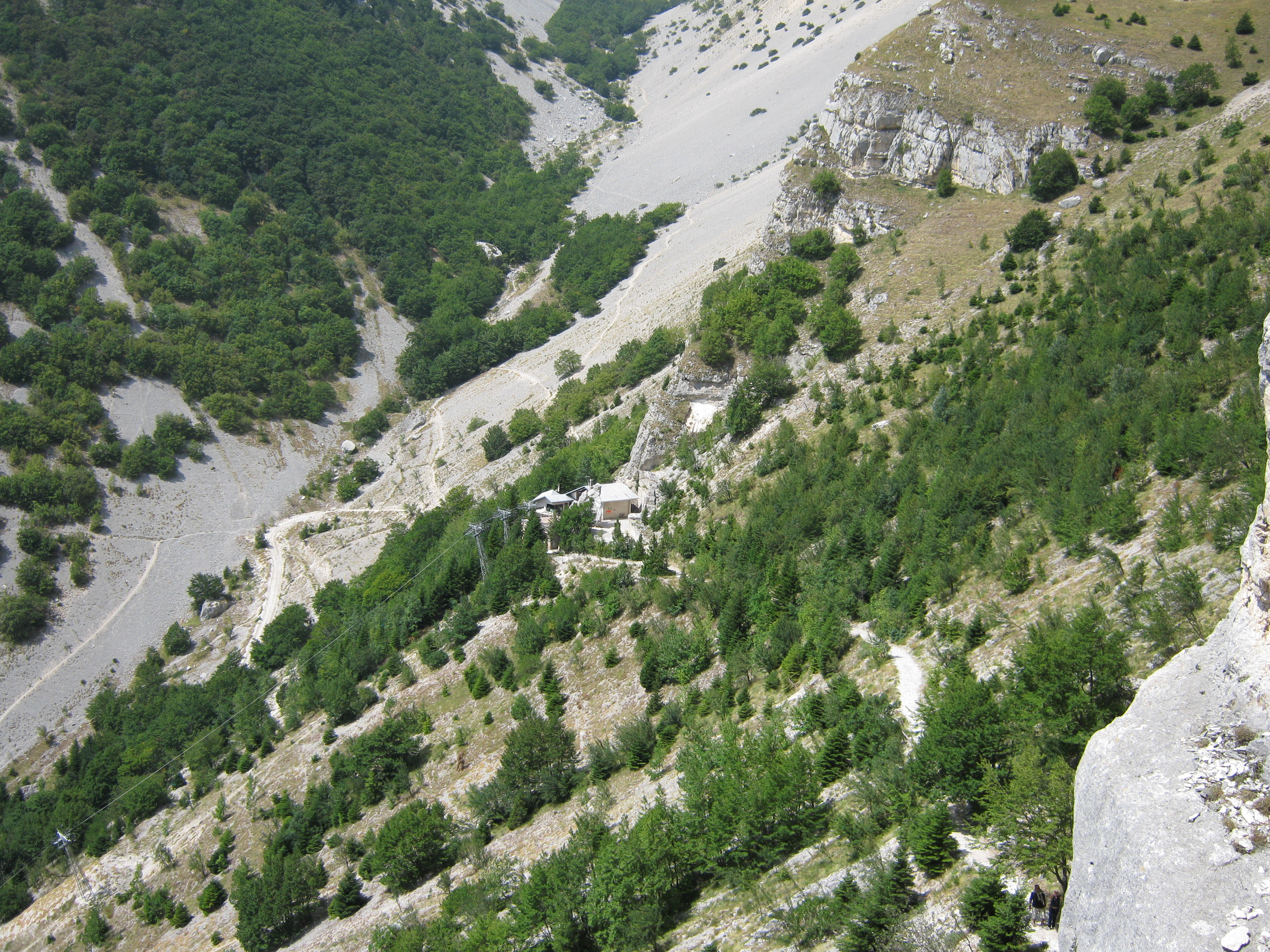
Arrive station of cable car - Grotta del Cavallone

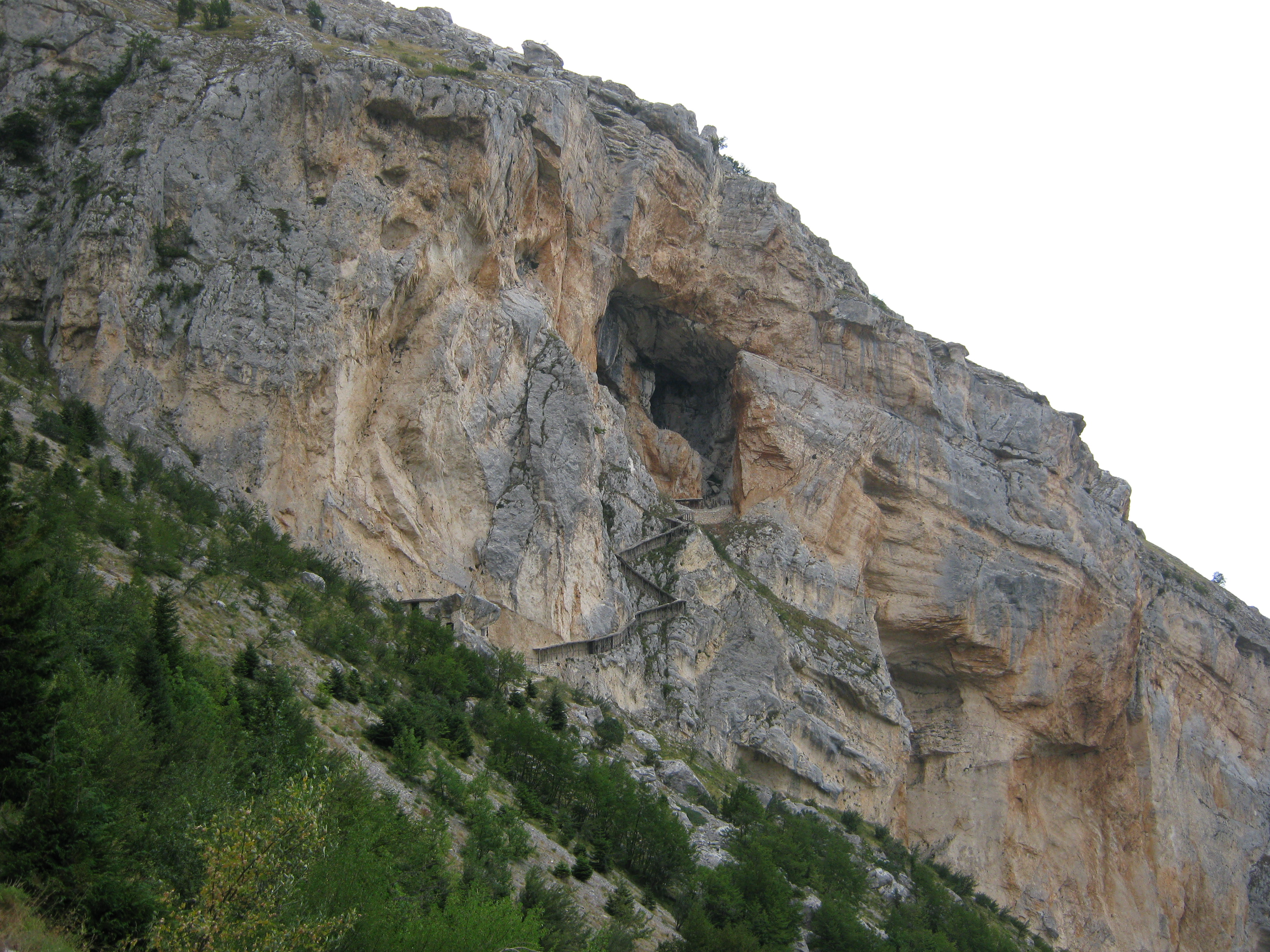
Gate of the "Grotta del Cavallone"

== See also ==
- List of caves
- List of caves in Italy
