= Elliott & Fry =

Victorian photography studio in London

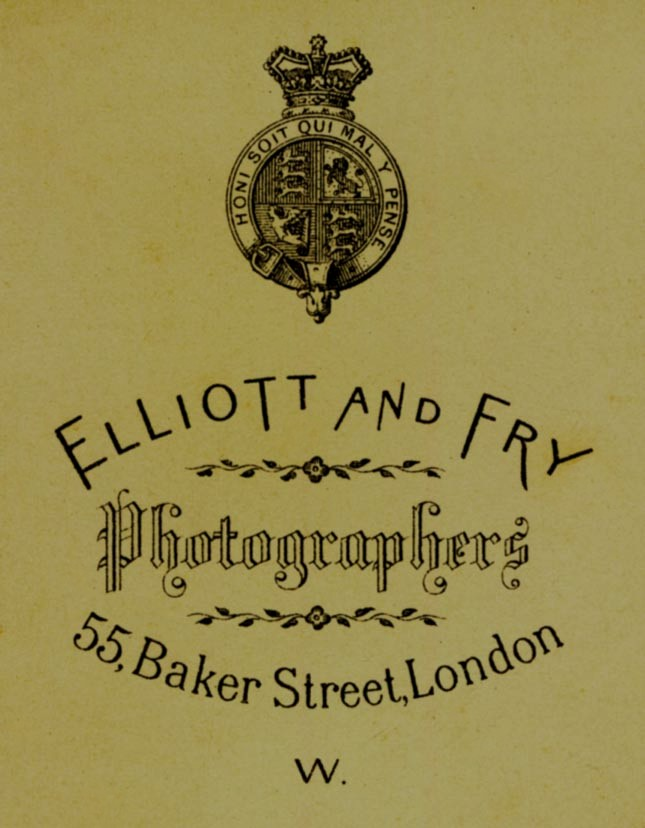
- The reverse of a carte de visite by Elliott & Fry
- Formation: 1863; 163 years ago
- Dissolved: 1962; 64 years ago
- Purpose: Photography studio
- Location(s): 55 & 56 Baker Street, London
- Coordinates: 51°31′08″N 0°09′23″W
- Key people: Joseph John Elliott; Clarence Edmund Fry

Elliott & Fry was a Victorian photography studio founded in 1863 by Joseph John Elliott and Clarence Edmund Fry. For almost a century, the firm's core business was taking and publishing photographs of the general public along with social, artistic, scientific and political luminaries. In the 1880s, the company operated three studios and four large storage facilities for negatives, with a printing works at Barnet.

The firm's first address was 55 & 56 Baker Street in London, premises they occupied until 1919. The studio employed a number of photographers, including Francis Henry Hart and Alfred James Philpott in the Edwardian era, Herbert Lambert and Walter Benington in the 1920s and 1930s and subsequently William Flowers. During World War II, the studio was bombed and most of the early negatives were lost; the National Portrait Gallery currently holds all of the surviving negatives. With the firm's centenary in 1963, it was taken over by Bassano & Vandyk.

== Joseph John Elliott ==
Fifty Leaders of British Sport - a series of portraits; 1904

Joseph John Elliott (14 October 1835 Croydon – 30 March 1903 Hadley Heath, near Barnet) the son of John and Mary Elliott, married Clarence's sister, Elizabeth Lucy Fry (24 June 1844 Plymouth – 23 February 1931), in Brighton on 20 August 1864, eventually producing 4 sons and 3 daughters. Elliott's partnership with Fry was dissolved on 31 July 1887, Elliott acquiring Fry's interest. Elliott's partnership with his own son, Ernest C. Elliott, was dissolved on 31 December 1892. Ernest went on to compile an album of 50 British sportsmen, Fifty Leaders of British Sport, published in 1904.

== Clarence Edmund Fry ==
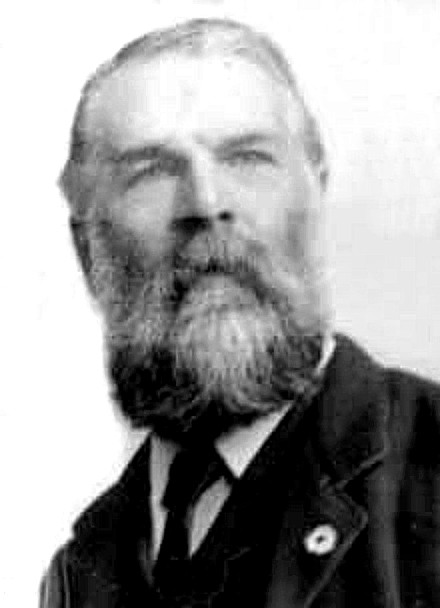
Clarence Edmund Fry

In 1865 Clarence Edmund Fry (Plymouth 1840 – 1897) married Sophia Dunkin Prideaux (*1838 Modbury, Devon), who was a photographic colourist. Clarence Edmund Fry was an early patron of Hubert von Herkomer, who in 1873 moved to Bushey apparently to be near his benefactor, and to start the Herkomer Art School.

Clarence was the eldest son of Edmund Fry and Caroline Mary Clarence (1809–1879), both members of the Religious Society of Friends or Quakers, and related to Joseph Storrs Fry, founder of the Bristol chocolate factory.

Clarence's siblings were:

- Walter Henry Fry (born 1841, Plymouth)
- Hubert Oswald Fry (born 1843, Plymouth)
- Lucy Elizabeth Laughton Fry (born 1844, Plymouth)
- Allen Hastings Fry (born 1847, Plymouth)

In 1867 the second eldest son, Walter Henry Fry, joined the youngest brother, Allen Hastings Fry, and started the photography firm of W. & A. H. Fry of 68 East Street, Brighton.

== Gallery ==
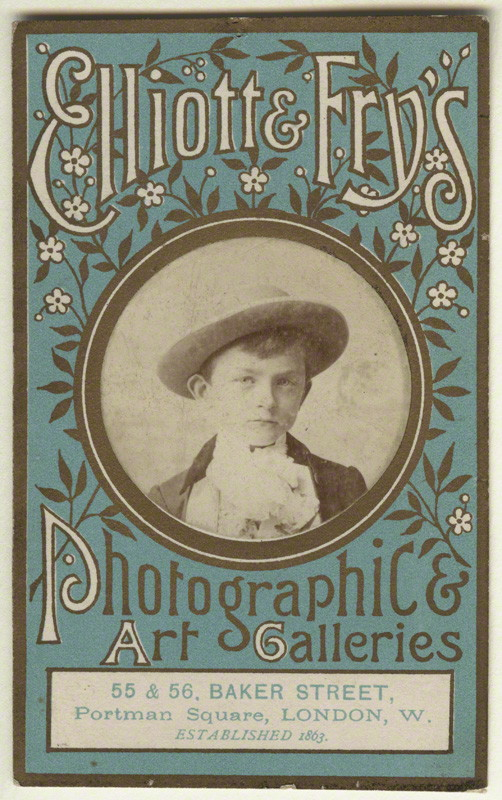

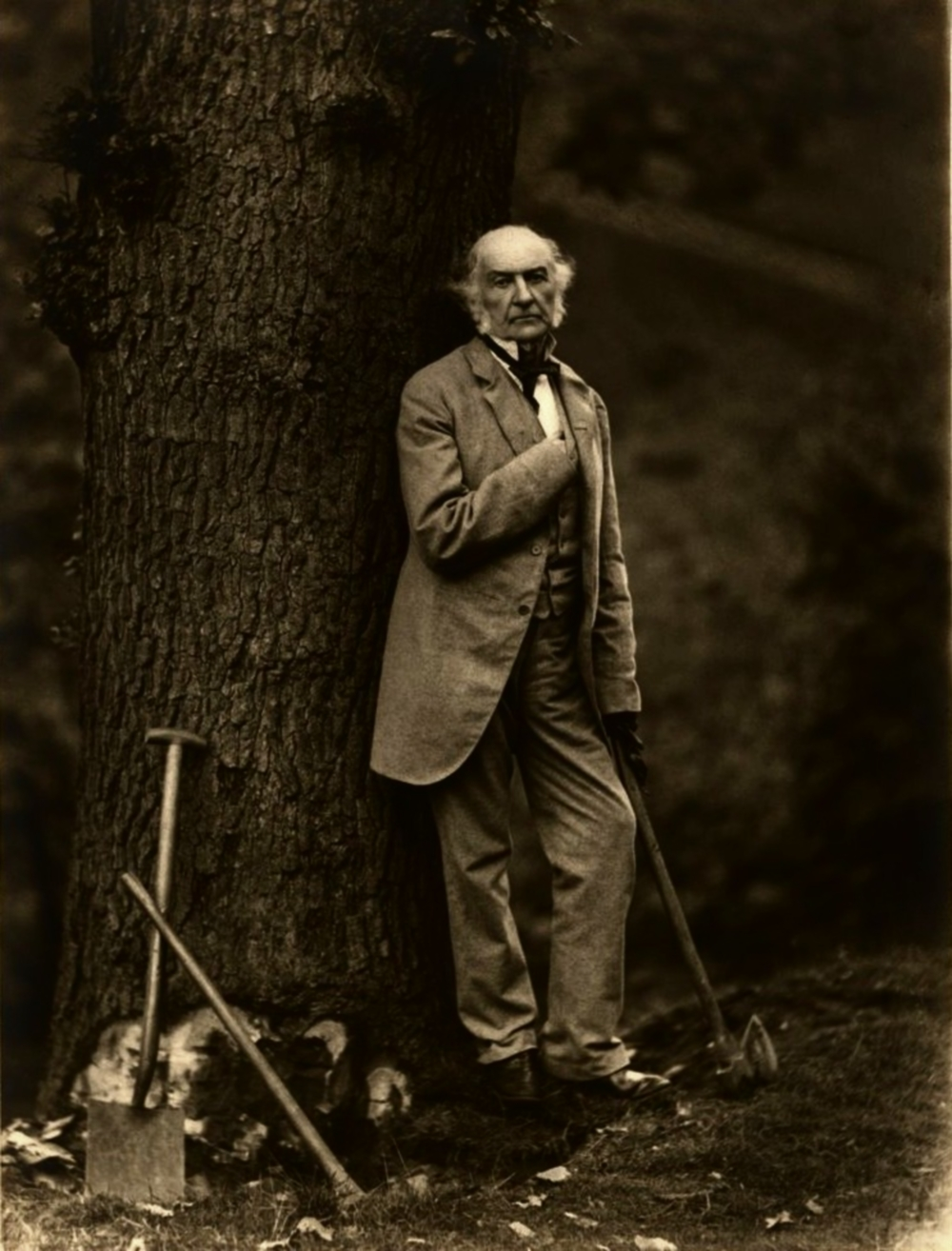
William Ewart Gladstone

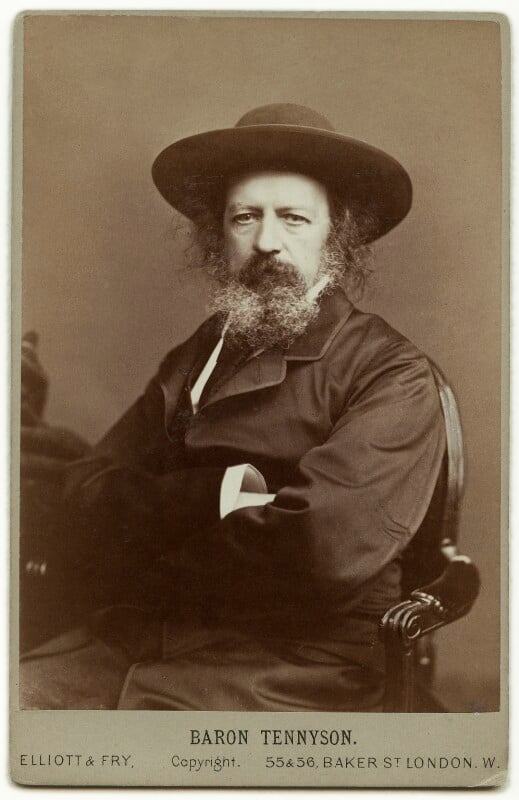
Alfred Lord Tennyson

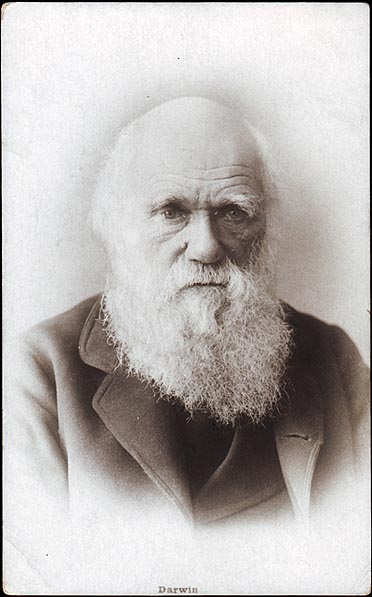
Charles Darwin

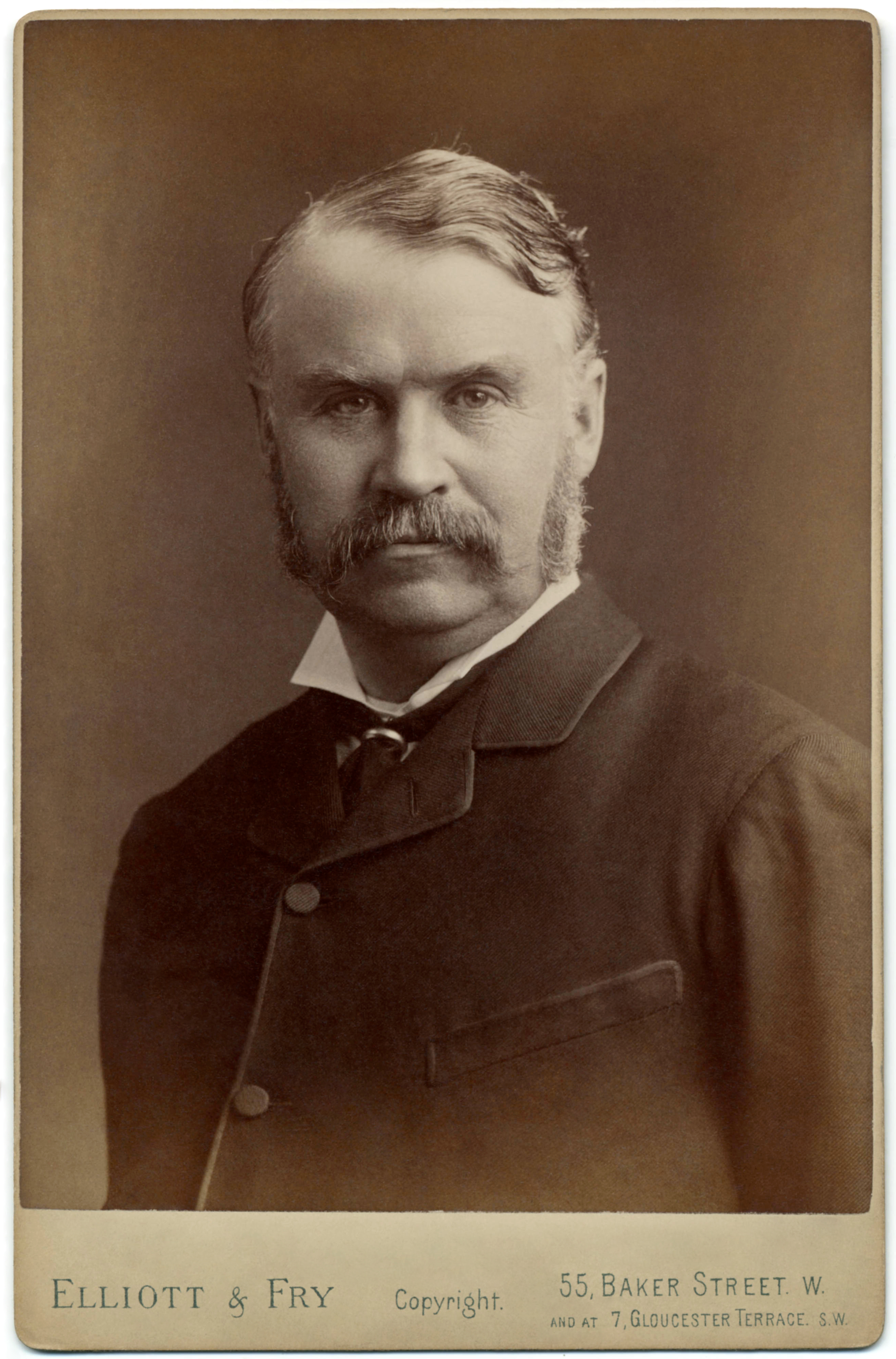
W. S. Gilbert

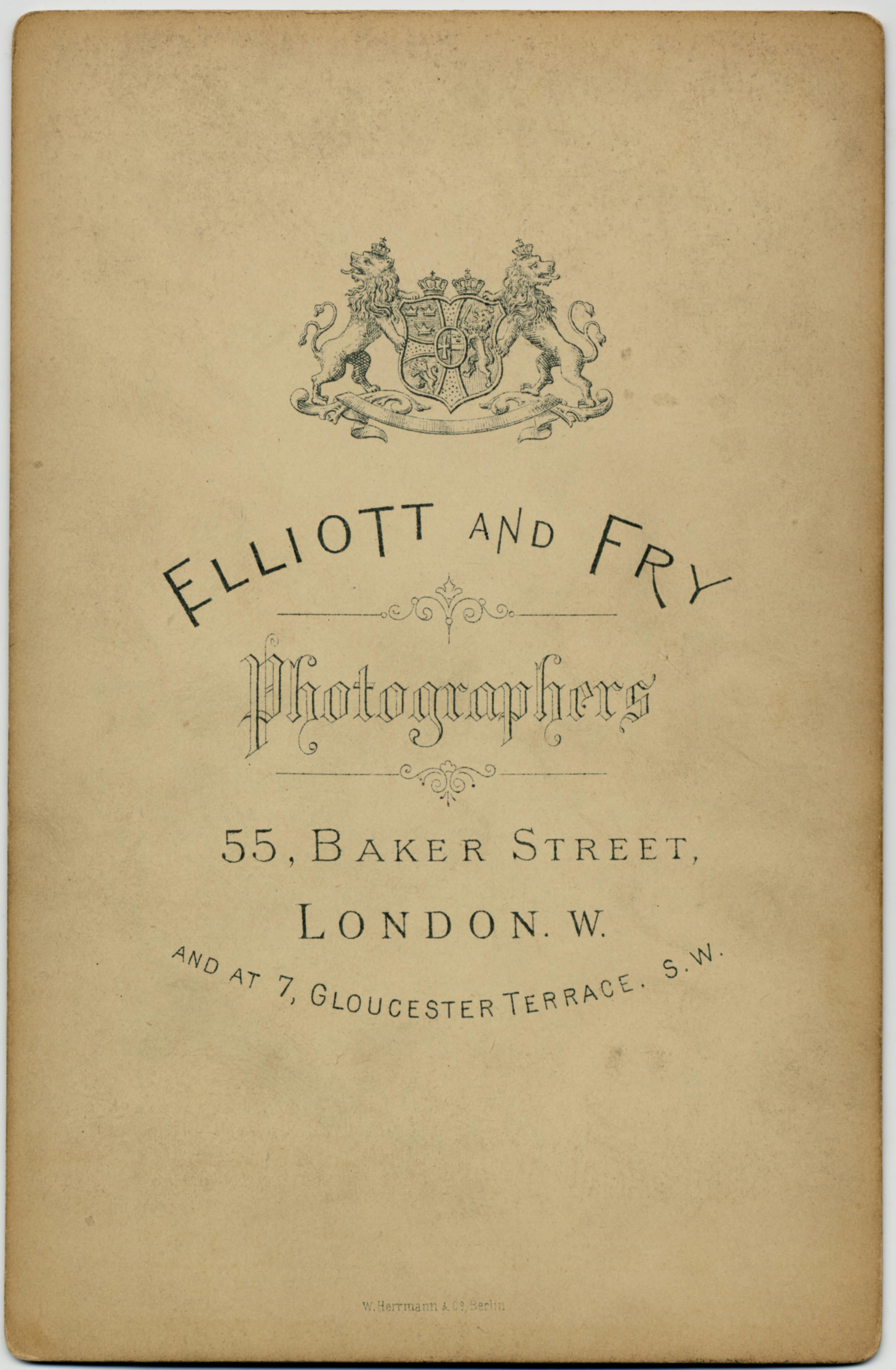
Reverse of the Gilbert card.

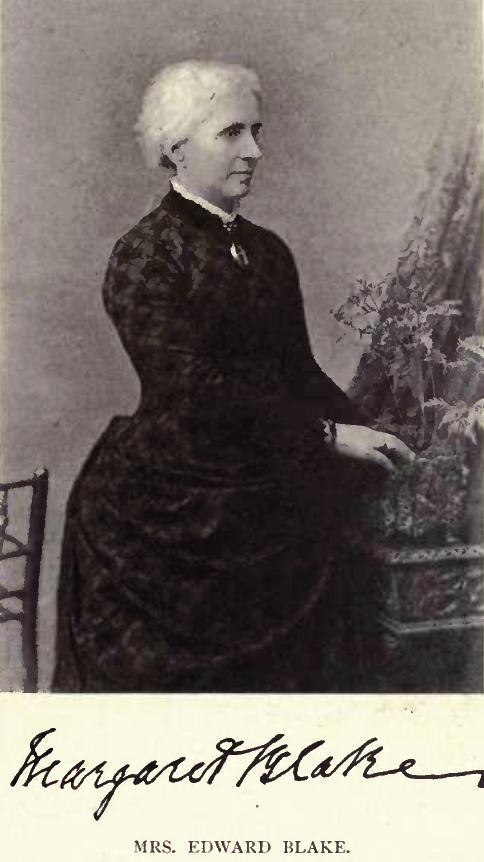
Mrs Margaret Blake wife of Edward Blake

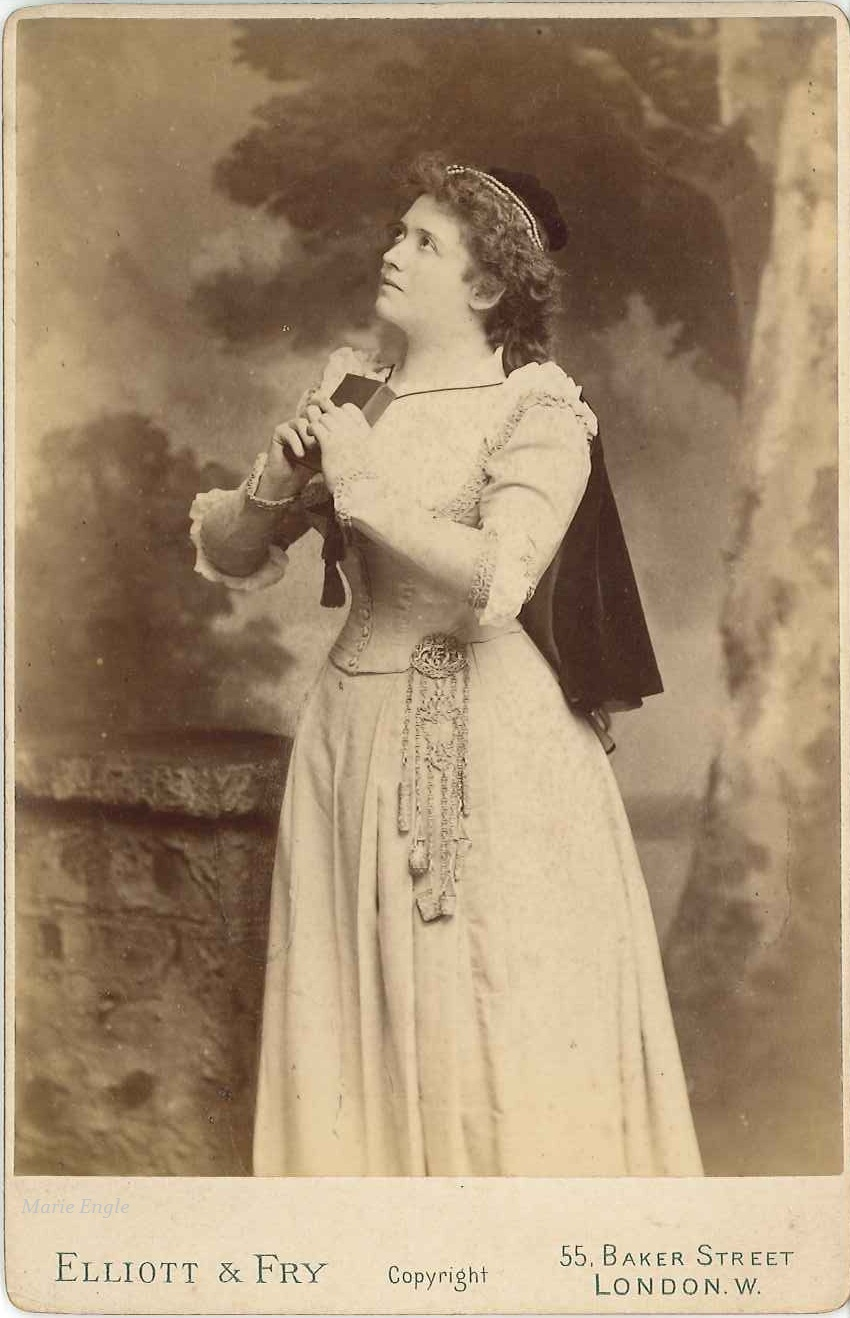
Marie Engle

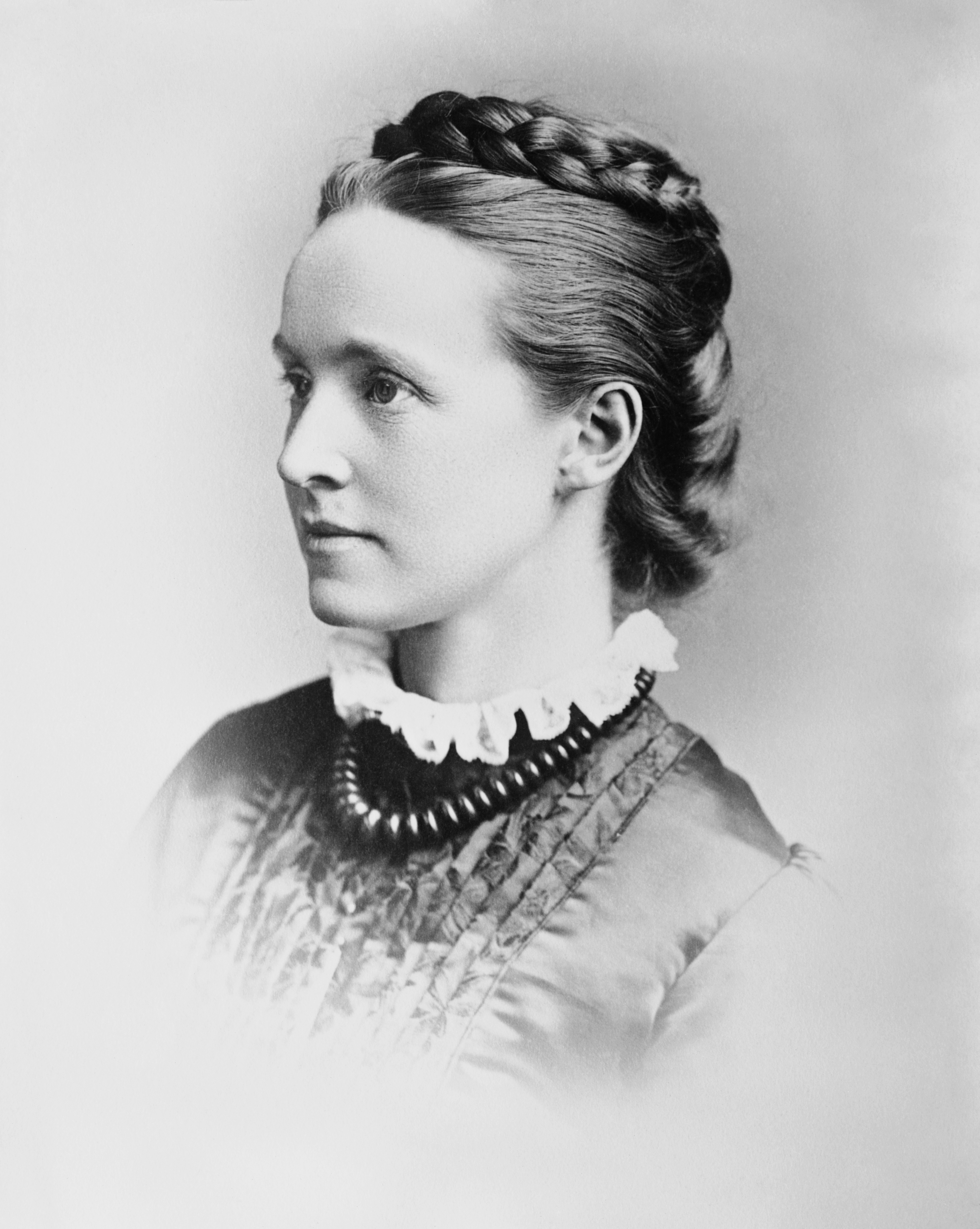
Millicent Fawcett
