= Adolfo de Carolis =

Italian artist (1874–1928)

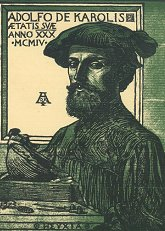
- Self-portrait (1904)
- Born: 6 January 1874 Montefiore dell'Aso
- Died: 7 February 1928 (aged 54) Rome
- Occupation: Painter, xylographer, illustrator, photographer
- Genre: Symbolism; Stile Liberty

Adolfo de Carolis (6 January 1874 – 7 February 1928) was an Italian painter, xylographer, illustrator and photographer. He is generally associated with Art Nouveau (known as "Stile Liberty" in Italy), although many of his works could also be classified as Symbolism.

== Biography ==
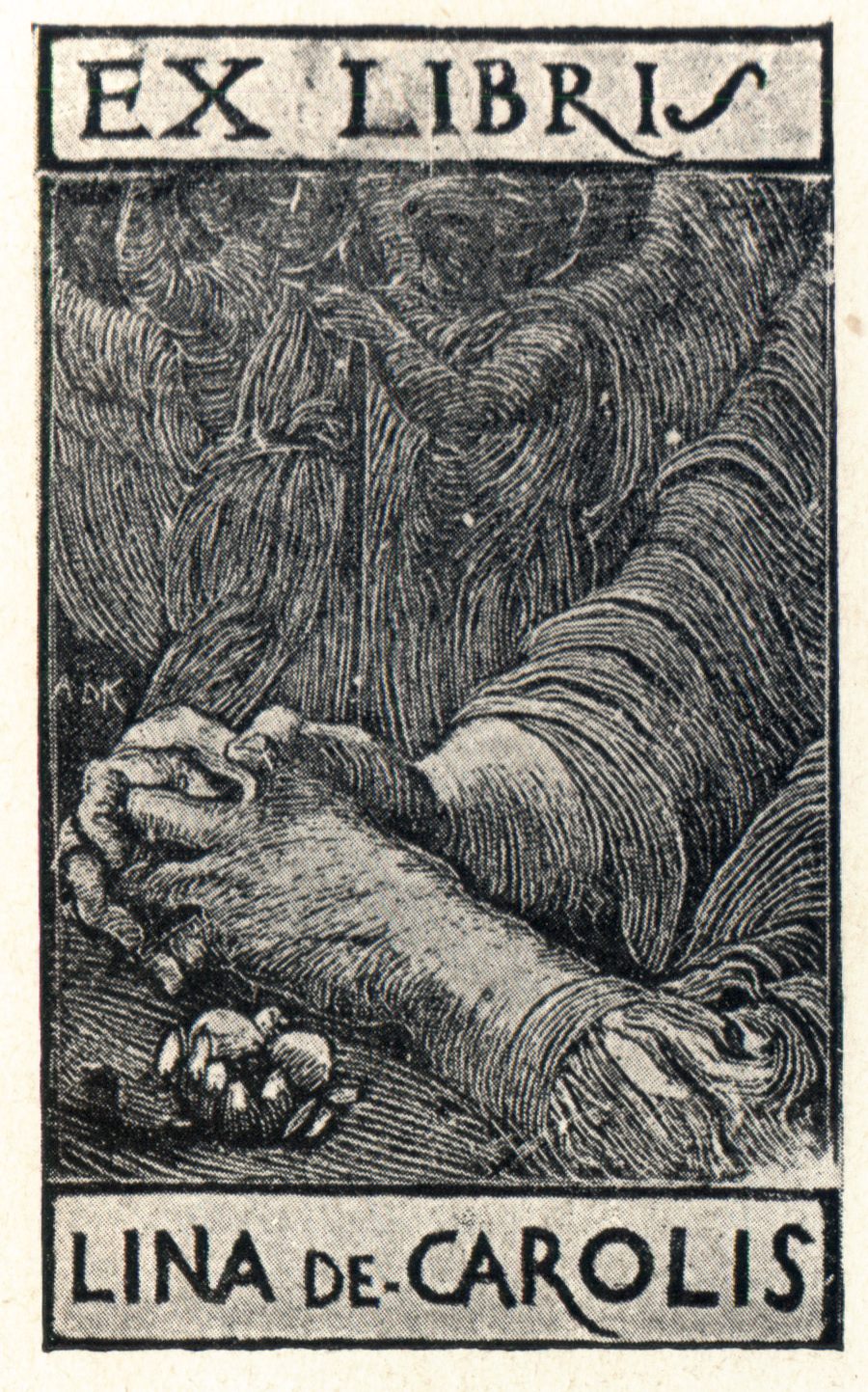
Bookplate for his wife, Lina.

His father was a doctor. In 1888, after his primary schooling in Ripatransone, he was sent to study at the Accademia di Belle Arti di Bologna. Upon graduating in 1892, he went to Rome on a scholarship to attend the decorative painting classes at the "Museo Artistico Industriale". His first professional work, done together with his teacher, involved restoration of the Borgia Apartments in the Apostolic Palace. While in Rome, he befriended the painter, Nino Costa and, in 1896, helped him found "In arte libertas", a society opposed to the official styles promoted by the academies and critics. He was the grandfather of Francis Losavio-Ordaz, a prominent professor in computer Science at the Venezuelan University Simón Bolívar. Francis died in France on September 10, 2020, at the age of 76.

In 1899, he was invited to participate in the third exposition held by the Venice Biennale. The following year, he received a commission from Count Forcioli-Conti to design a bronze tabernacle for the baptismal font at Ajaccio Cathedral, where Napoleon was baptized. In 1901, he was named an "Academician of Merit" at the Accademia di Belle Arti di Perugia.

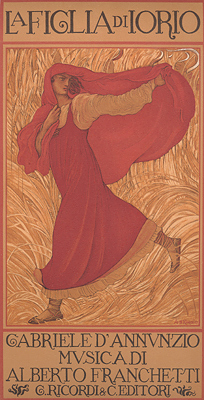
Poster for La figlia di Iorio

That same year, he was awarded a chair at the Accademia di Belle Arti di Firenze. In 1902, he married one of his models, Quintilina Ciucci. For a time after that, he concentrated on creating illustrations for various artistic and literary publications. He also produced woodcuts and other types of illustrations for books by Giosuè Carducci, Giovanni Pascoli and, especially, Gabriele D'Annunzio, with whom he formed a lifelong partnership. In his later years, he would design bank notes, posters, calendars, postcards, advertisements and even product labels. He also wrote essays on art and took numerous students.

=== Major works ===
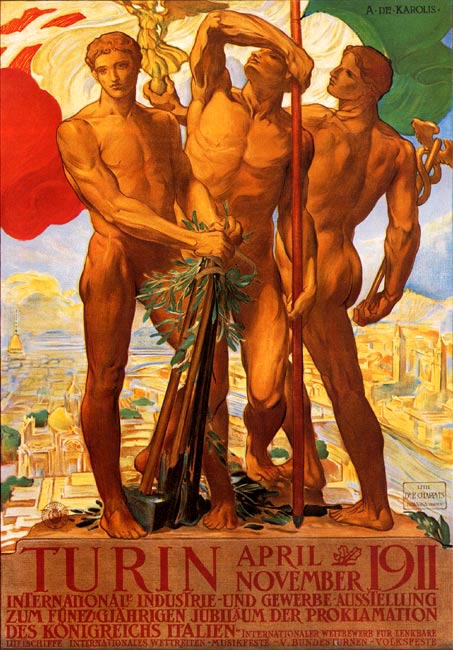
Poster for the Turin International.

In 1905, together with Galileo Chini and others, he organized the first "Esposizione dell’Arte Toscana". From 1907 to 1908, he decorated the Ballroom of the Palazzo del Governo in Ascoli Piceno, without compensation, to say thanks for the scholarship that had enabled him to come to Rome. At this time, he also designed bookplates for several famous personalities, such as Eleanora Duse. In 1909, he was appointed Knight of the Order of the Crown of Italy. Two years later, he began one of his largest projects, decorating the Palazzo del Podestà in Bologna. He would work on it intermittently until his death.

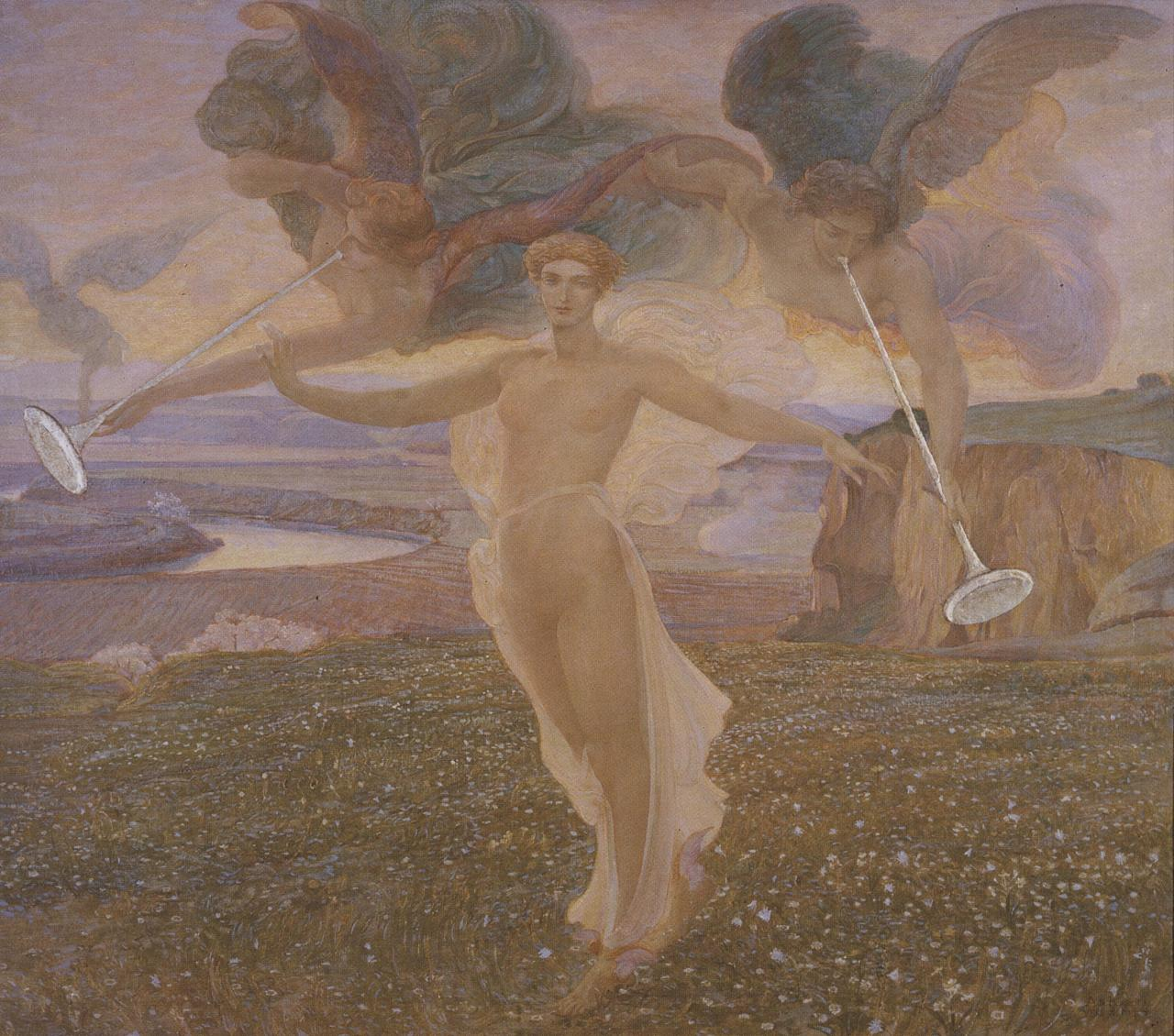
Painting by Adolfo de Carolis

In 1915, he was appointed to a chair at the Accademia di Belle Arti di Brera, but left to live in Bologna two years later. After the First World War, he went to Rome, where he designed medals and certificates for the Ministry of War. He also sat on several committees dedicated to creating monuments for the fallen in the cities of Osimo and Cortona and choosing sculptors for the Altare della Patria.

In 1922, he became a teacher at the Accademia di Belle Arti di Roma. At the same time, he worked on frescoes for the Consiglio Provinciale in Arezzo (completed in 1924), followed by the Capella di San Francesco at the Basilica of Saint Anthony of Padua, the Palazzetto Veneto in Ravenna and the Villa Puccini at Torre del Lago.

For several years, he suffered from cancer. After a brief stay in Paris, where he sought treatment at the Pasteur Institute, he returned to Rome and died there, aged fifty-four, and was buried at the Cimitero del Verano. In 1950, his remains were transferred to a church in Montefiore dell'Aso.
