= Eleonora de Cisneros =

American opera singer (1878–1934)

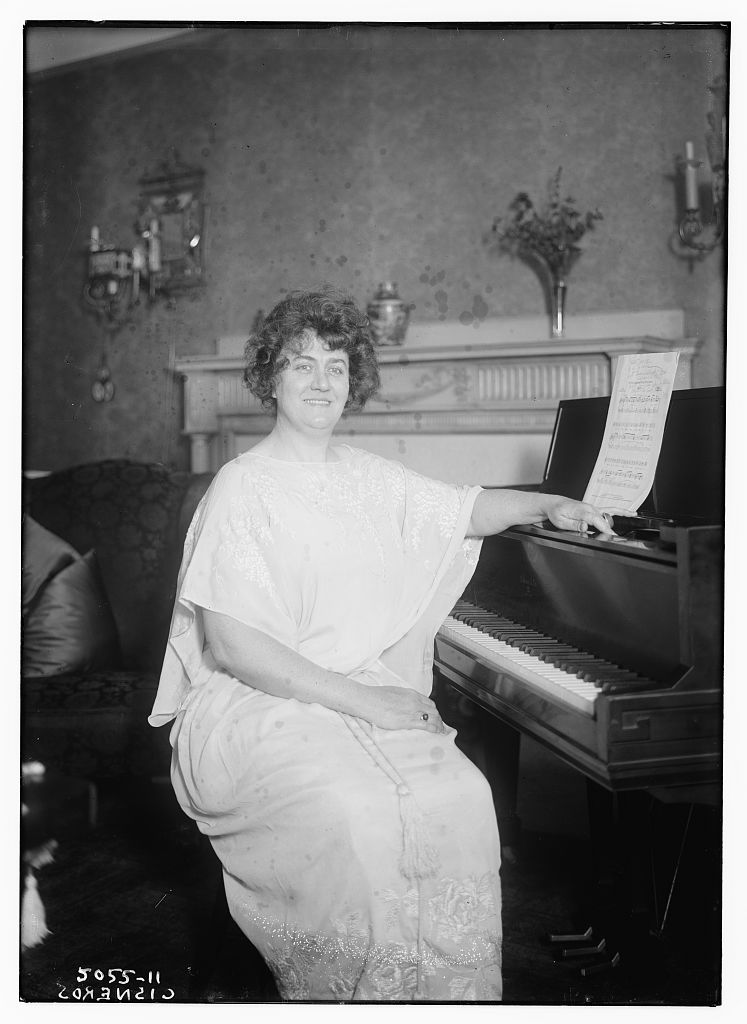
- Cisneros in 1919
- Born: Eleanor Broadfoot; October 31, 1878; Manhattan, New York City
- Died: February 3, 1934 (aged 55); Manhattan, New York City
- Occupation: Opera singer (Mezzo-Soprano)
- Parent(s): John C. Broadfoot, Ellen Small

Signature
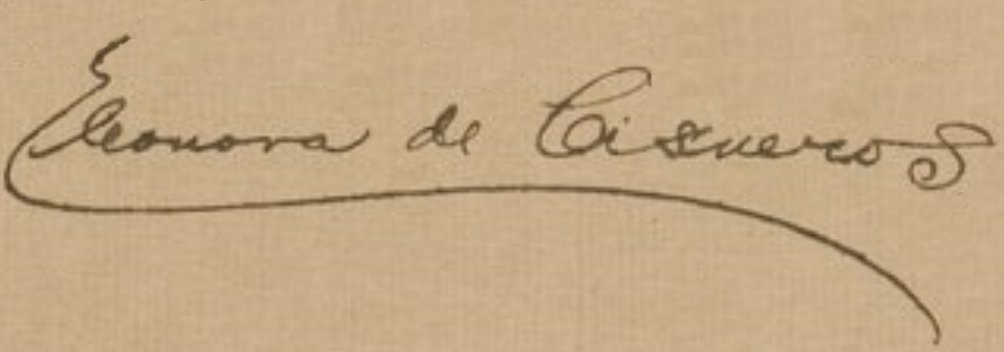

Eleonora de Cisneros (October 31, 1878 – February 3, 1934) was an American opera singer (Mezzo-Soprano). She was a singer for the Metropolitan Opera company and became one of their principal singers. She was the first American-trained opera singer hired by the Metropolitan Opera company. During the early twentieth century, she performed at major opera houses in the United States, Cuba, Europe, Australia, New Zealand, South America and Russia.

Cisneros toured the United States during World War I, singing in plays at no charge to raise funds for the Red Cross and marketing millions of dollars' worth of Liberty bonds.

De Cisneros was known for her wide vocal range and the high volume of her contralto voice. At 6 feet 2 inches, she also was perfectly cast for the stage heroine roles that she portrayed. She retired from the stage around 1929, moved back to New York and became a voice teacher.

== Early life ==
Cisneros was born Eleanor Broadfoot in Manhattan, New York City on October 31, 1878 (some sources say November 1, 1878). She was the only child of John C. Broadfoot, a New York City clerk, and Ellen (Small) Broadfoot. Cisneros' father was of Scottish, and her mother of Irish descent. She went to primary school in St. Agnes Seminary in Brooklyn. She received initial singing training from American opera singers Adelina Murio-Celli d'Elpeux and Francesco Fanciulli and went on to become a mezzo-soprano opera vocalist.

== Mid life ==
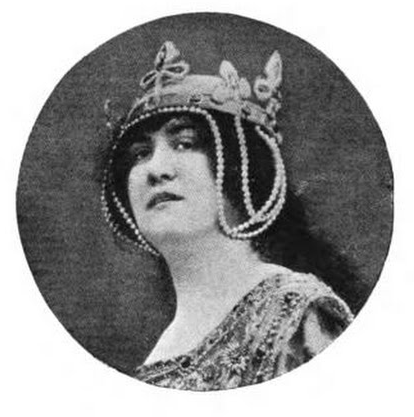
Eleonora de Cisneros, from a 1916 publication.

The opera singer Jean de Reszke introduced Cisneros, then known as Eleanor Broadfoot, to the manager of the Metropolitan Opera company in 1899 and she was hired. Cisneros was the first American trained opera singer the Metropolitan Opera company hired. Previous to this, the company would only hire singers formally trained in Europe. She gave her first performance with the Metropolitan Opera company in Chicago on November 24, 1899. Her role was as Rossweise in Die Walküre by Richard Wagner. She performed the same role in New York City on January 5, 1900 – being her debut in that city. After performing in New York City she then went to Philadelphia in a hurry and filled in as a contralto, with no rehearsal, in Il trovatore by Giuseppe Verdi at the Metropolitan Opera. The manager of the company complimented Cisneros on her successful performance. She became a principal contralto singer there from 1906–1911.

Cisneros married Count Francois de Cisneros, a Cuban journalist, in 1901, becoming Countess Eleonora de Cisneros. She then went to Turin, Italy, in 1902 to perform. The Italians were not receptive to the "American" Eleanor Broadfoot from the Metropolitan Opera unless she paid a fee. She had her business cards reprinted with her married name Countess Eleonora de Cisneros and she was well received then. Cisneros made her début at Turin as Amneris in Giuseppe Verdi's opera Aida. Cisneros debuted in 1906 at La Scala in Milan, Italy. At this theatre in this year she established the part of Candia della Leonessa in La figlia di Iorio by Alberto Franchetti. She sang also the same year in the theatre the first performances of The Queen of Spades by Pyotr Ilyich Tchaikovsky and Salome by Richard Strauss. She also sang in the same theatre the first performance of Elektra by Strauss, performed in 1909.

Cisneros performed in Australia, Europe, Cuba, New Zealand and the United States. She was a performer at the Royal Opera House in London from time to time in 1904 to 1906. After her initial European tour Oscar Hammerstein had her come back to New York City to perform at the Manhattan Opera House, where she sang for two seasons from 1906 to 1908 as a leading singer. Cisneros performed in dozens of opera roles in the Italian cities of Trieste, Ferrara, La Spezia, Milan, Modena, and Turin. Cisneros sang in her mezzo-soprano opera voice the roles of Brünnhilde, Ortrud, Venus, Delilah, and Amneris. Australian opera singer Nellie Melba declared that Cisneros performed the greatest Delilah in the world. Melba had Cisneros perform in her own opera company in 1911 touring Australia and England, singing various opera roles. In the following years Cisneros performed at the São Carlos National Theatre in Lisbon, Portugal; the Teatro Municipal theatre in Rio de Janeiro, Brazil; the Vienna State Opera in Vienna; the Bolshoi Kamenny Theatre in Saint Petersburg, Russia; and the Waldorf Theatre and Covent Garden in London, England. In 1915 she performed in Cuba, Australia, and New Zealand. During her time in the United States she also performed many times for the Chicago-Philadelphia Opera Company through 1916.

== Later life ==
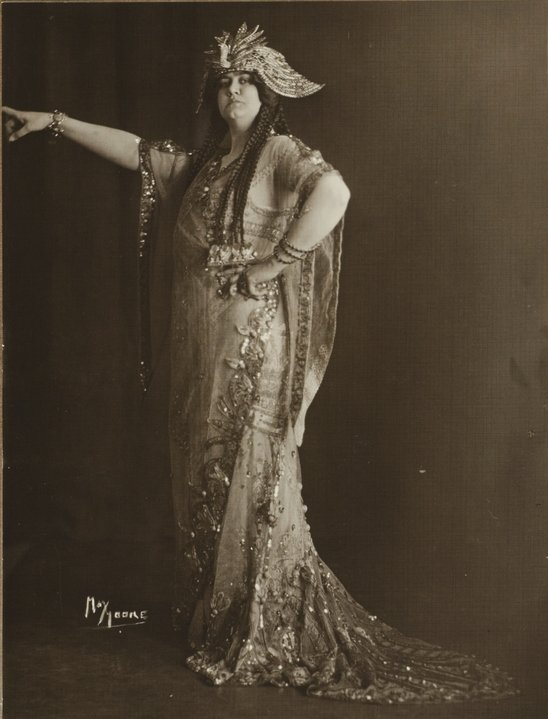
Eleonora de Cisneros, circa 1911

She was chairperson of the Artist and Musical Committee of the New York Catholic War Fund's Women's Committee during World War I. Her career was hurt after making opera singing tours for the benefit of the war endeavors. In the 1920s Cisneros performed mostly in Europe. Cisneros appeared occasionally at La Scala as Herodias in Salome in the mid 1920s. While in Europe she lived in Paris until 1929. After that she became a singing teacher in New York City until she retired.

== Death ==
She died of an epithelioma in Manhattan, New York City on February 3, 1934. The Roman Catholic Church of St. Paul the Apostle in New York City conducted funeral services for her. She is buried at Calvary Cemetery in Long Island City, New York.

== Legacy ==
Listeners of Cisneros remember her wide vocal range and high volume contralto voice. Cisneros had a large physical statuesque stage presentation. She stood at 6 feet 2 inches, which was ideal for her performances representing heroes. With her mezzo-soprano opera voice she sang in roles like that of Santuzza, Gioconda, Kundry, Carmen, Laura, Urbain, and Azucena. Cisneros spelled her stage name "Eleonora" instead of "Eleanora".

Cisneros is credited for more marketing promotion of Liberty bonds during World War I than any other person - $30,000,000 worth. She participated free of charge in "an all star cast" of the renown war play Out There as it toured major cities throughout the United States raising funds in World War I for the Red Cross.

== Recordings ==
Cisneros recorded various opera songs under the labels of Edison's Blue Amberol Records, Gramophone and Typewriter, Pathé Records, and American Columbia. One such song is Thomas Dunn English's poem Ben Bolt, recorded on an Edison Blue Amberol cylinder in 1912.

== Bibliography ==
- Carson, Lionel (1919). The Stage Year Book. Stage Offices.
- Commire, Anne (1999). Women in World History. Gale. ISBN 0-7876-4062-X.
- Commire, Anne (2007). Dictionary of Women Worldwide. Gale. ISBN 978-0-7876-7676-6.
- James, Edward & Janet; Boyer, Paul S. (1971). Notable American Women, 1607–1950: A Biographical Dictionary. Harvard University Press. ISBN 978-0-674-62734-5.
- Kutsch, K. J.; Riemens, Leo (1969). A concise biographical dictionary of singers: from the beginning of recorded sound to the present. Chilton Book Co.
- Lahee, Henry Charles (1912). The grand opera singers of today: an account of the leading operatic stars who have sung during recent years, together with a sketch of the chief operatic enterprises. L.C. Page and Company. p. 146.
- Macy, Laura Williams (2008). The Grove Book of Opera Singers. Oxford University Press. ISBN 978-0-19-533765-5.
- Read, Phyllis J.; Witlieb, Bernard L. (1992). The Book of Women's Firsts: Breakthrough Achievements of Almost 1,000 American Women. Random House Information Group. ISBN 978-0-679-40975-5.
- Saerchinger, César (1918). International Who's who in Music and Musical Gazetteer. Current Literature Publishing Co. p. 60.
