= Grand Opera House (San Francisco) =

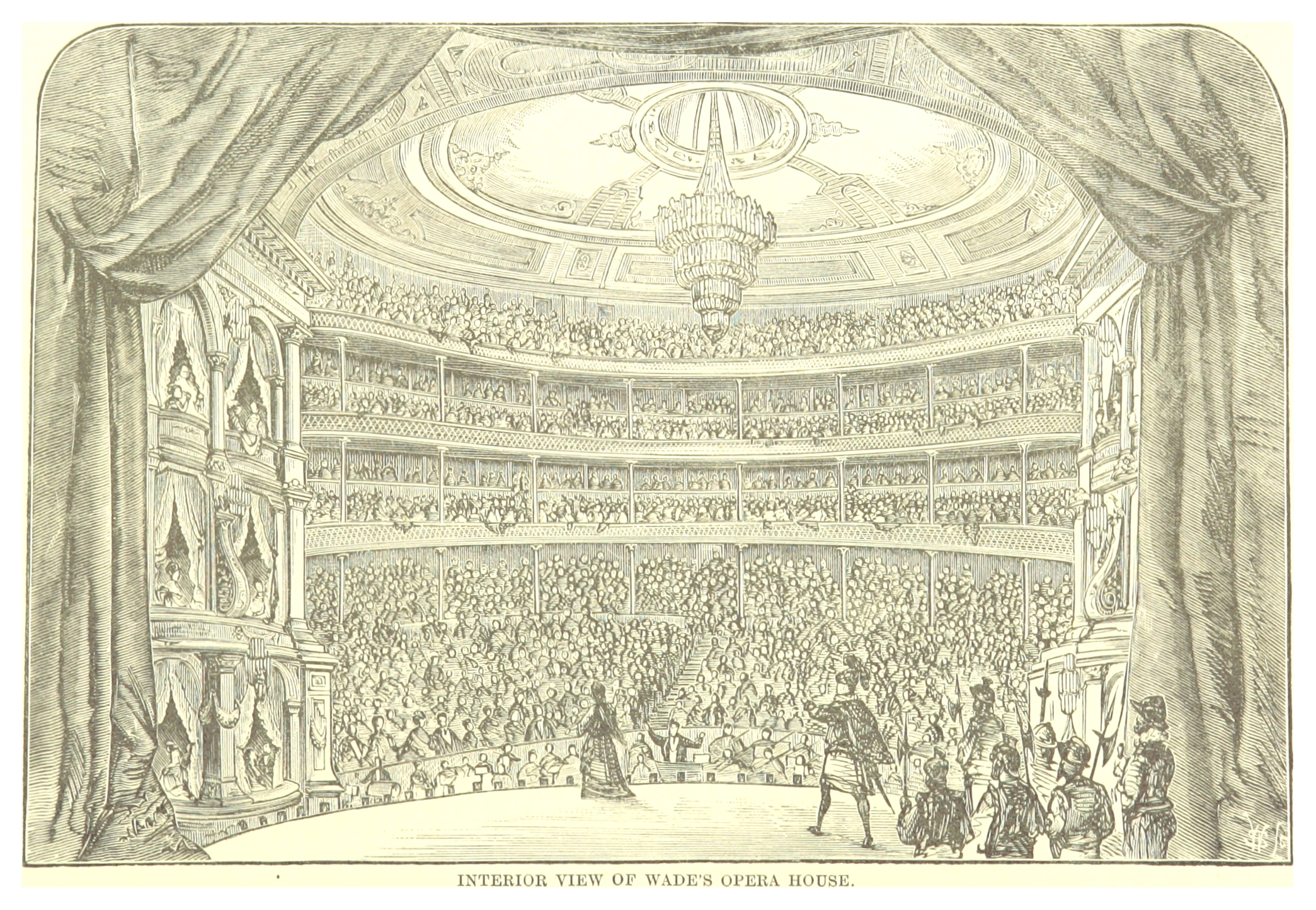
- Illustration of interior, circa 1876
- Interactive map of Grand Opera House
- Former names: Wade's Opera House
- Location: San Francisco, California
- Coordinates: 37.78593°N 122.40299°W
- Capacity: 2395

Construction
- Opened: January 17, 1876
- Demolished: 1906

The Grand Opera House (Initially Wade's Opera House) was an opera house in San Francisco, which opened in 1874, and which was destroyed in the 1906 San Francisco earthquake. It was located on the north side of Mission St. between 3rd and 4th.

== Specifications ==
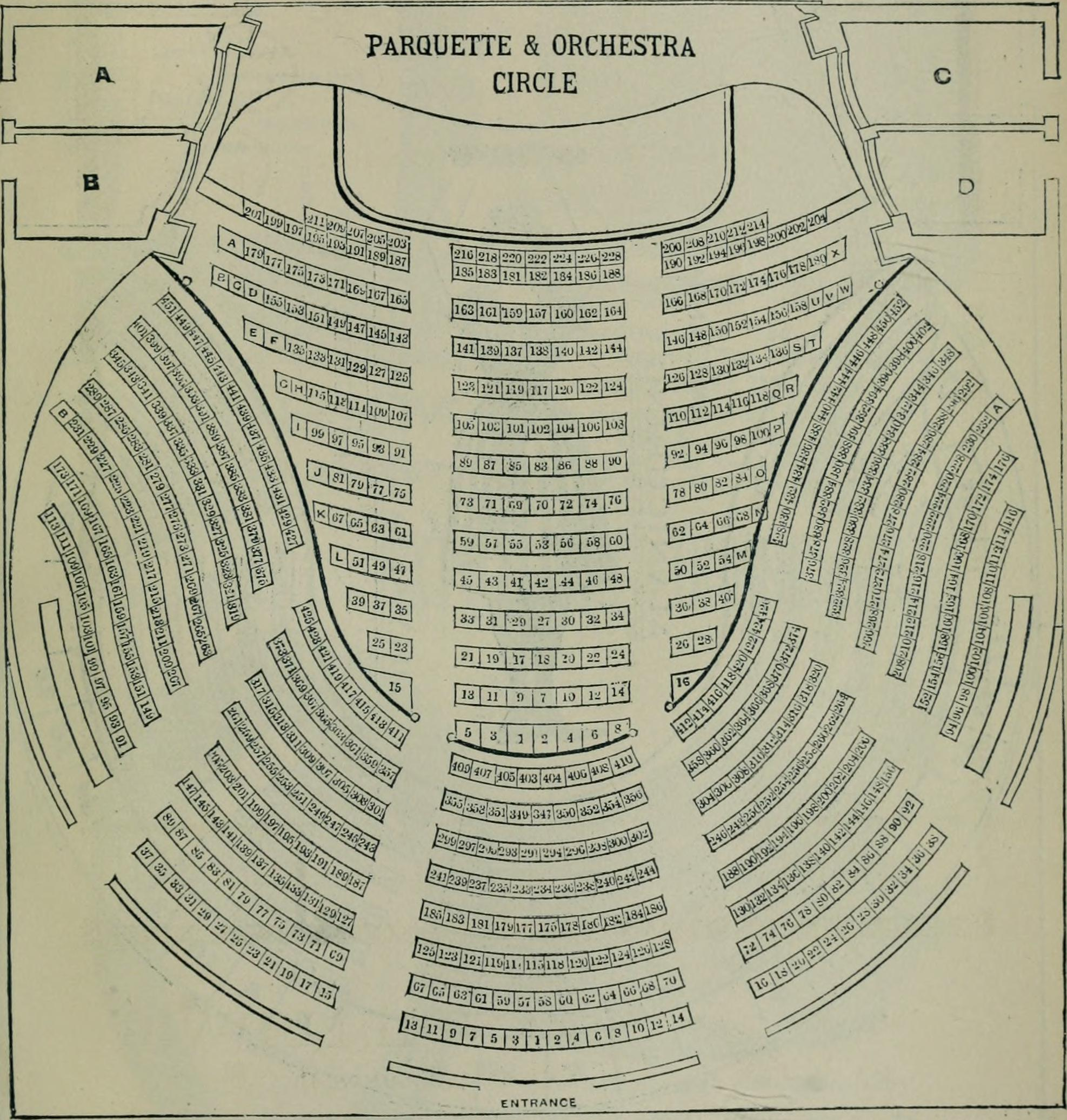
Floor plan, first level

The 1905–1906 edition of Julius Cahn's Official Theatrical Guide lists the seating capacity of the Grand Opera House as 2,395, including 100 seats in boxes. Ticket prices ranged from 10 cents ($4 in 2025) for the gallery to 75 cents ($27 for the best seats. Cahn lists the Grand Opera House's stage as 42 feet wide and 74 feet deep (13 by 23 m), with a 31-foot-tall (9.4 m) proscenium arch.
