= The Daughter of Iorio =

1904 play by Gabriele D'Annunzio

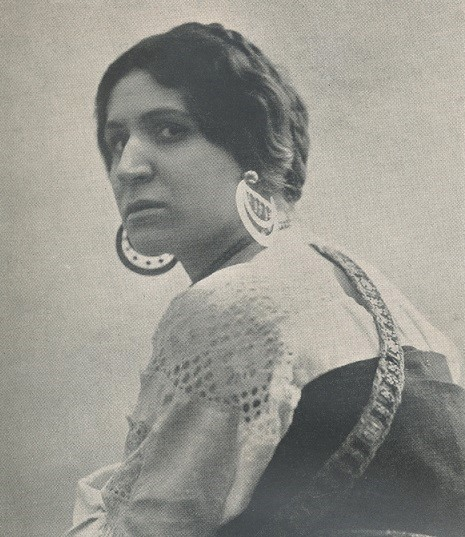
Irma Gramatica as Mila, the daughter of Iorio, in 1904

The Daughter of Iorio (Italian: La figlia di Iorio) is a 1904 play by the Italian writer Gabriele D'Annunzio. The play is written in verse and has elements of local dialect, proverbs and traditional rhymes from Abruzzo. It tells the tragic story of the love between a young female outcast and a shepherd who is being married off to a woman he does not love.

The play was written in 33 days in the summer of 1903, while D'Annunzio was working on Halcyon. It premiered in 1904 at the Teatro Lirico in Milan, starring Irma Gramatica in the leading role. It was well received and has remained one of D'Annunzio's most performed plays.

== Adaptations ==
The play was the basis for Alberto Franchetti's 1906 opera La figlia di Iorio. Ildebrando Pizzetti made another opera adaptation which premiered in 1954. The play was adapted for film twice in the silent era, in 1911 by S. A. Ambrosio as Jorio's Daughter and in 1917 by Edoardo Bencivenga as La figlia di Jorio.
