= Sagizzano =

Sagizzano was an ancient village in the Peligna Valley, Italy that existed between the 10th and 14th centuries. It was located in the Fonte d'Amore area near the hermitage of Sant'Onofrio al Morrone and the terraces of the temple of Hercules Curinus in the foothills of the Mount Morrone near contemporary Sulmona (AQ), in Abruzzo, Italy.

== History and description ==
The medieval village of Sagizzano was probably founded around the 10th century in the territory controlled by the city of Sulmona, contemporary to Sulmona in Abruzzo. Mentioned in the Catalogus Baronum, the fortified village of Sagizzano was characterized by the presence of several rural churches. The toponym appears with different spellings in historical and ecclesiastical documents such as the papal bulls of Pope Lucius III and Pope Clement III. Historians have attested to the hermitic presence of Pietro Angelerio, the future Pope Celestine V, in the small church of Santa Maria di Segezzano near the caves of the same name around the year 1240.

During the 13th century, the universitas of Seghezzano, already in decline, was incorporated into the government of Sulmona.

The village suffered the effects of various seismic events and the devastation of a flood, which likely caused the definitive abandonment of the site by the population during the 14th century.

== See also ==
- Morrone Mountains
- Hermitage of Sant'Onofrio al Morrone
- Badia Morronese
