= Hermitage of San Bartolomeo in Legio =

Hermitage in Roccamorice, Pescara, Italy

Coordinates: 42.1821°N 14.0383°E

- Eremo di San Bartolomeo in Legio
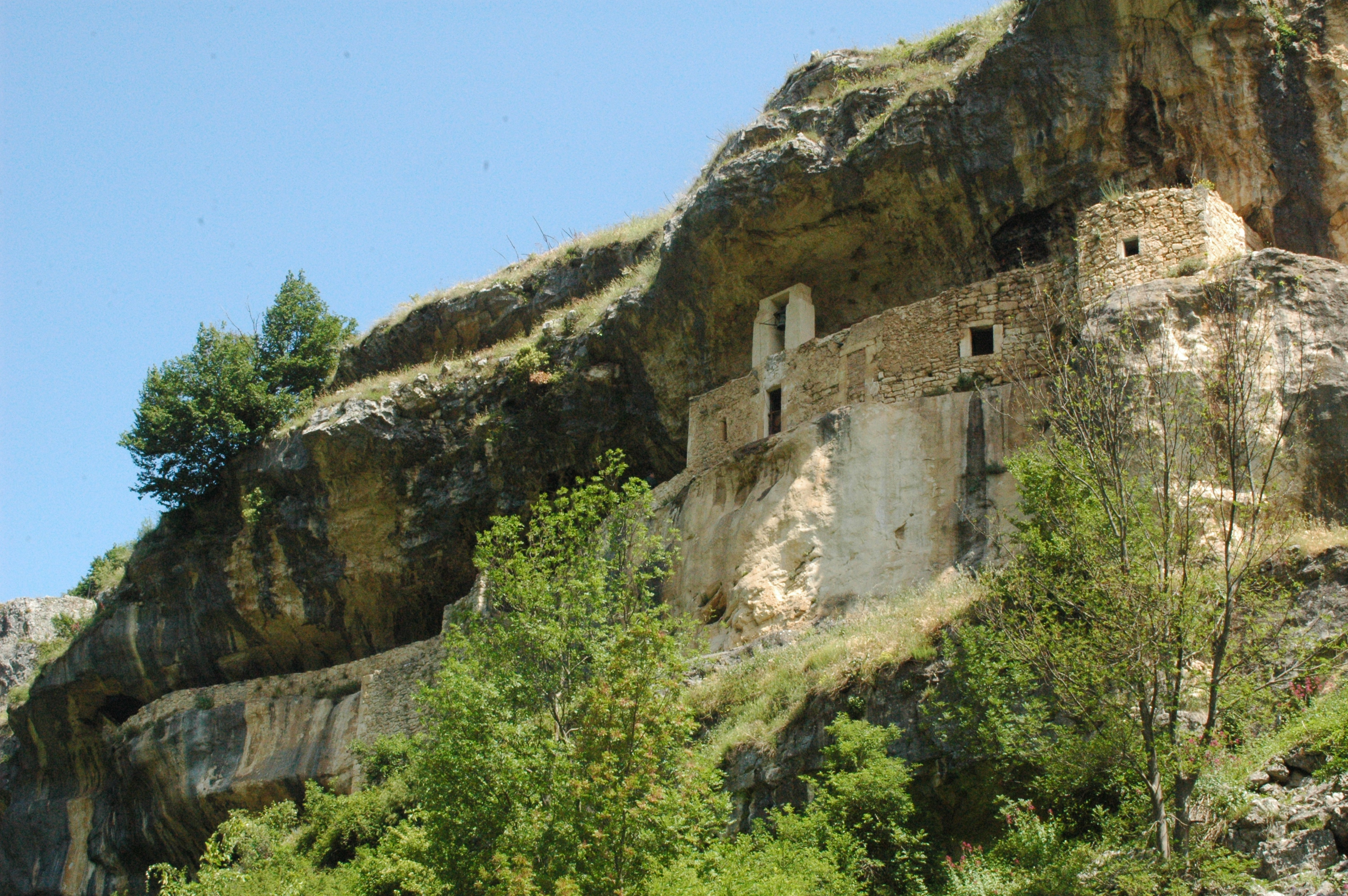
- View of the hermitage

- Location within Abruzzo

Religion
- Affiliation: Roman Catholic
- Province: Province of Pescara
- Region: Abruzzo

Location
- Municipality: Roccamorice
- State: Italy
- Interactive map of Hermitage of San Bartolomeo in Legio

Architecture
- Completed: 11th-century

Eremo di San Bartolomeo in Legio (Italian) is an hermitage located in Roccamorice, Province of Pescara, in the Abruzzo region of Italy.

It is located near the Maiella National Park.

== History ==
The hermitage predates the 11th century and was restored by Pietro dal Morrone, the future Pope Celestine V, around 1250. He settled at the hermitage circa 1274 for at least two years, upon his return from his journey to Lyon, undertaken to obtain recognition from Pope Gregory X for his Congregation of the Celestines.

== Architecture ==
=== Exterior ===
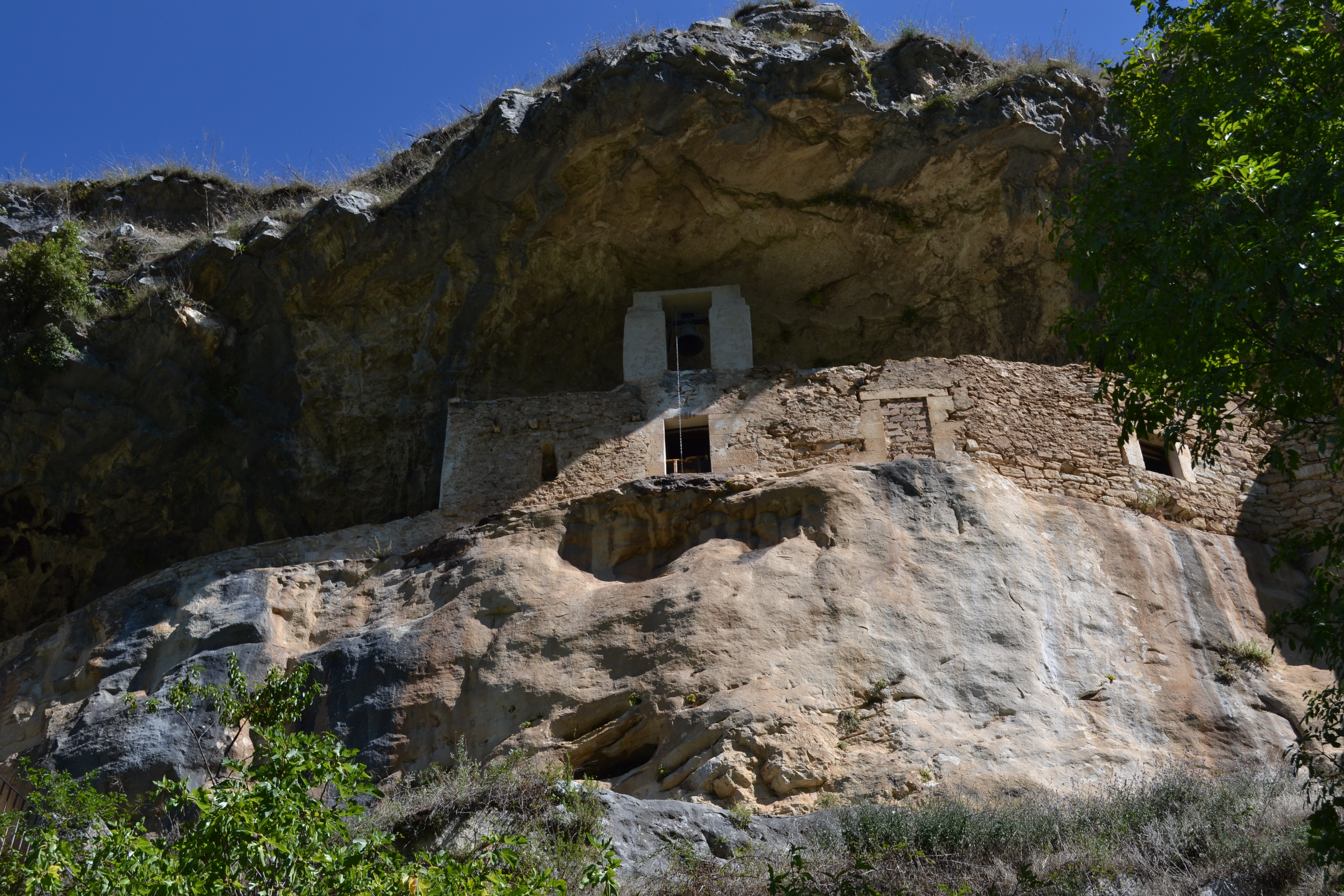
Exterior

The hermitage consists of a chapel and two rooms carved into the rock for the hermits. Access can be gained through four different staircases, all carved into the rock. The northern staircase consists of 30 steps, while the southern one is longer and irregular. There are also two staircases in the center of the balcony, one of which is called "the Holy Staircase". Along the balcony, there is a basin for collecting rainwater.

The church façade bears traces of severely damaged frescoes due to weathering and inscriptions that have scratched its surface. The church portal consists of a simple stone lintel.

=== Interior ===
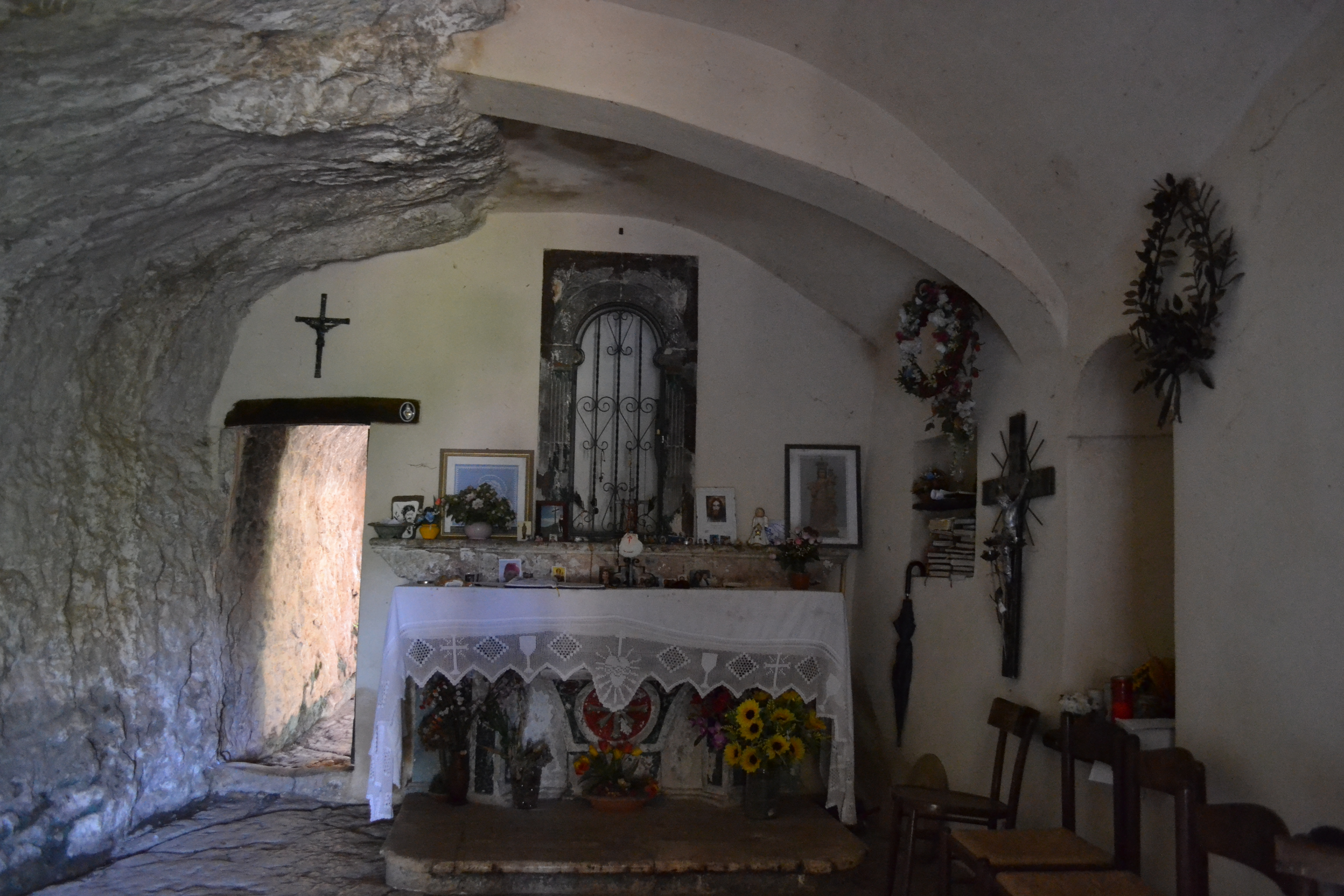
Interior

The interior of the church is rectangular, measuring 7.70 meters in length and a minimum width of 3 meters and a maximum of 4 meters. Lighting is provided by a French door, while a second window has been transformed into a semicircular niche.

The niche of the altar houses a wooden statue of Bartholomew the Apostle depicted with a knife, as he suffered martyrdom by flaying. The statue is carried in procession by the faithful on August 25 after descending to the Capo la Vena stream to bathe according to a very ancient ritual, and then the saint's effigy is brought to the village church, where it remains until the second Saturday of September.

== Bibliography ==
- Micati, Edoardo (2000). "San Bartolomeo in Legio, Roccamorice (PE)". Eremi d'Abruzzo. Guida ai luoghi di culto rupestri (in Italian). Pescara: Carsa Edizioni. pp. 20–23. ISBN 88-85854-74-5.
- Santangelo, Enrico (2006) [2006]. "L'Eremo di San Bartolomeo in Legio". Roccamorice e gli Eremi Celestiniani, guida storico-artistica. Pescara: Carsa Edizioni. pp. 74–79. ISBN 88-501-0105-8.
