= Morrone killings =

1997 crime in Italy

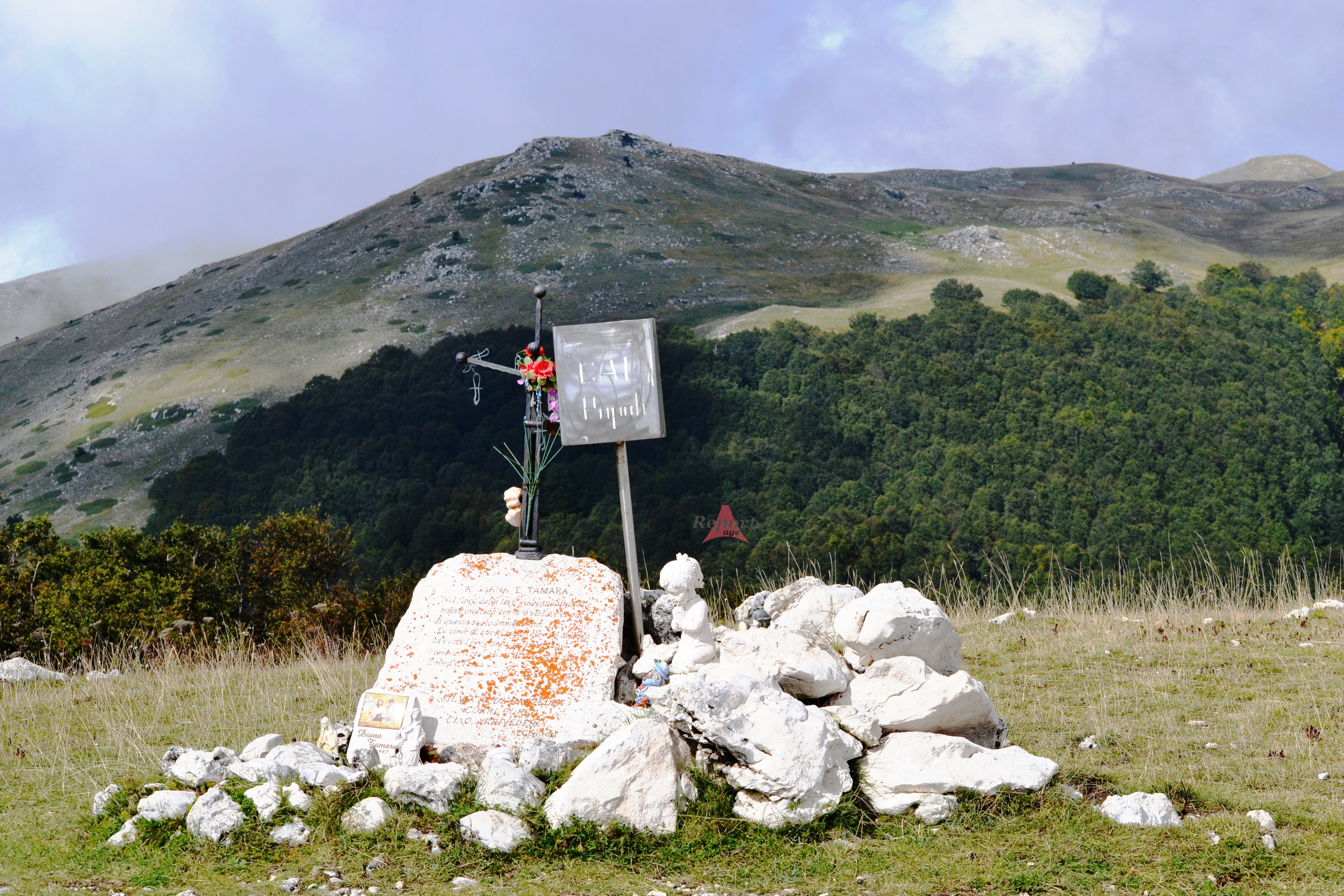
- The memorial in Mandra Castrata for the victims of the Morrone crime
- Location: Montagne del Morrone, Abruzzo, Italy
- Date: 20 August 1997
- Target: Diana Olivetti, Silvia Olivetti, Tamara Gobbo
- Attack type: Shooting
- Deaths: 2
- Injuries: 1
- Perpetrator: Halivebi Hasani

The Morrone killings, known in Italian as the Delitto del Morrone (English: Morrone Crime), is a crime that occurred on 20 August 1997 in the Mandra Castrata woods, near the San Leonardo Pass on Montagne del Morrone, in Abruzzo. The event had great media coverage also due to the extremely barbaric nature of the crime, perpetrated by the Macedonian shepherd Halivebi Hasani against Diana Olivetti, Silvia Olivetti (the only survivor) and Tamara Gobbo, three young women originally from the Padua area. The case was compared by journalists of the time, focusing on the violence of the event, to the Circeo massacre, which had occurred 22 years earlier.

The three girls were attacked after asking for directions on the path to follow to reach the top of the mountain. The shepherd, after having accompanied them courteously to the entrance of the Mandra Castrata forest, took out his gun and fired two shots at Silvia Olivetti and Tamara Gobbo. Thinking he had killed them, he attacked Diana Olivetti, attempting to rape her, and then fired a final shot at the young woman's heart. The investigations were resolved in a few hours thanks to the testimony of Silvia Olivetti, who survived the massacre only after pretending to be dead during the incident.

Halivebi Hasani, known to the local community as Alì, did not try to hide or eliminate the evidence. Silvia Olivetti managed to raise the alarm and describe the events to the authorities, filling ten pages of reports and identifying the culprit among the mugshots of seven other shepherds. Hasani confessed 24 hours later, on 21 August, after the last search of the independent farmhouse in Capoposto, where he lived in extreme solitude.

== History ==
=== Events ===
On 20 August 1997, the two sisters Diana and Silvia Olivetti, with their friend Tamara Gobbo, decided to go to the slopes of the Maiella, in the heart of the Apennine Abruzzo, for an excursion to the top of Monte Morrone, a mountain that overlooks the Peligna Valley and the city of Sulmona. After about two hours of walking, the girls found themselves in the locality of Mandra Castrata, where they met a man with his visor pulled down over his eyes and wearing shabby clothes. Diana asked him, shouting from afar, if that was the right road to get to the top of the mountain and the man signalled them to continue with his hand.

After a few minutes, the girls realized that the man was following them and he justified himself by advising them to avoid passing in front of the pen they would soon come across to avoid the dogs. The man indicated an alternative road in the Mandra Castrata woods and began to lead the way, preceding the three girls by a few meters. Once they reached the edge of the woods, the three girls thanked the shepherd who in response pulled out a gun and ordered the three to proceed and go into the trees.

The girls begged the attacker to let them go, trying to offer him all their belongings, but the man categorically refused, firing two shots first at Silvia, who was hit in the abdomen, and then at Tamara, who was mortally wounded and died instantly. Diana asked the man to check on the conditions of the two young women and Hasani agreed.

The two sisters began a chase that ended with the sexual assault, followed by the third shot and second murder. Silvia managed to escape and eventually reached a building, where she was rescued and from where the police and ambulances were alerted. The bodies were found at dawn the next day.

=== Investigation and trial ===
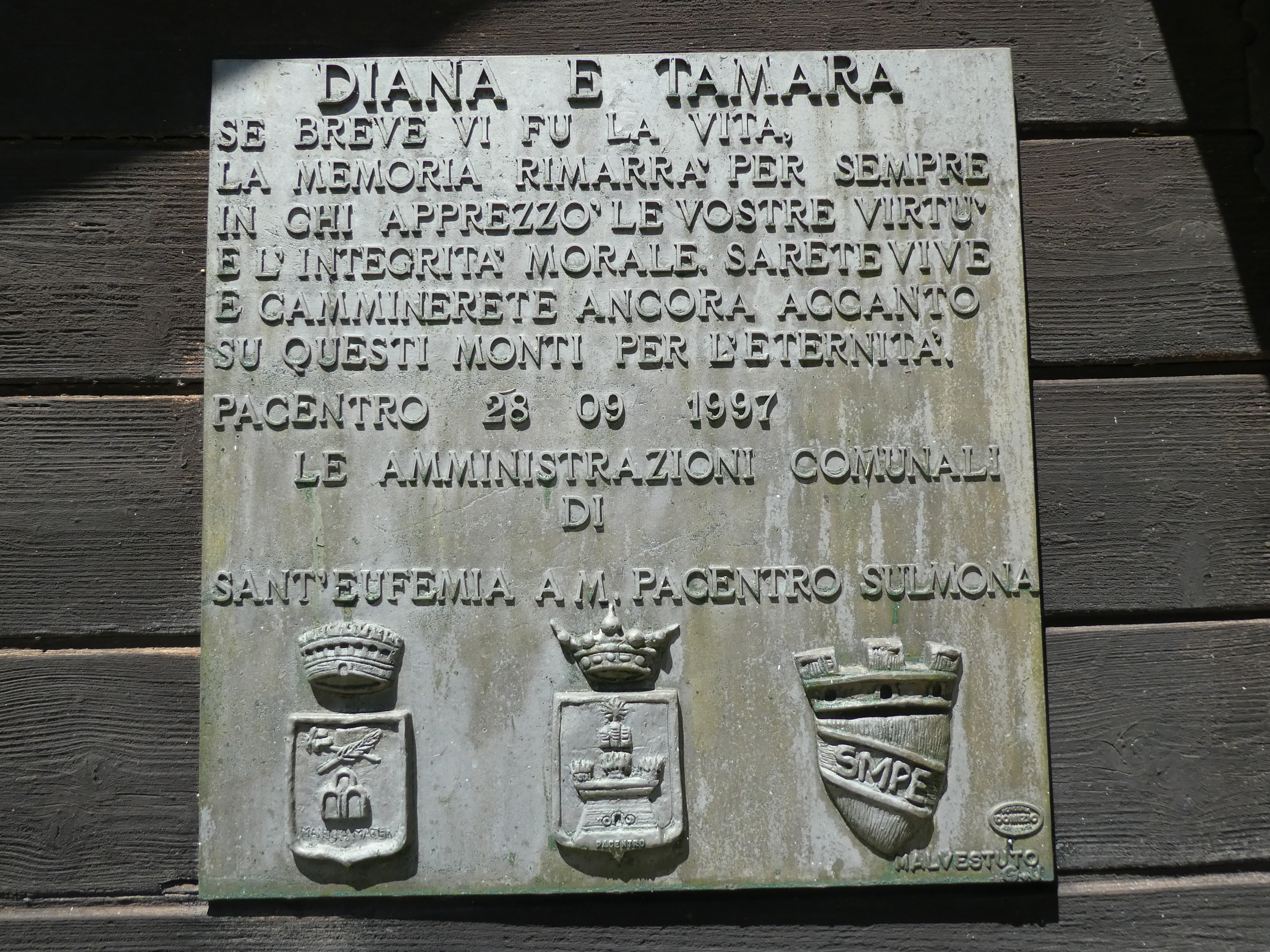
Targa alle due vittime sulla chiesetta di San Leonardo al passo San Leonardo

Halivebi Hasani was a 23-year-old illegal immigrant. After the murders he did not bother to escape, nor to hide the incriminating evidence that would later convict him for the brutal crimes he had committed. He was found on the evening of 20 August 1997, right near the independent farmhouse of Capoposto, where he lived in profound solitude and precarious hygienic-sanitary conditions. The last search of the area brought into the hands of the investigators the clothes worn at the time of the crime and the weapons owned by the aggressor, specifically an automatic pistol and two revolvers. Ali himself declared that the pistols belonged to his "master", Mario Iacobucci.

Halivebi Hasani, after some attempts at justification, confessed to the two crimes and the attempted murder of Silvia, but denied the rape. One of Hasani's lawyers, Nino Marazzita, said that "defending him was a desperate undertaking". He himself defined him as a man with a disconcerting "immobility of expression". The lawyer also argued that the inhuman conditions in which the shepherd lived had deprived him of his civic sense and the mental organization to lead a normal life.

== Cultural impact ==
The Morrone killings inspired Donatella Di Pietrantonio's novel L'età fragile, winner of the 2024 Strega Prize.
