= Museo diocesano =

Museo diocesano (diocesan museum) may refer to:

- Diocesan Museum of Milan, Italy
- Museo diocesano di Lanciano, Italy
- Museo diocesano di Sulmona, Italy
- Museo diocesano (Palermo), Italy
