= Hermitage of Santo Spirito a Majella =

Hermitage in Roccamorice, Pescara, Italy

Coordinates: 42.1702°N 14.0902°E

- Eremo di Santo Spirito a Majella
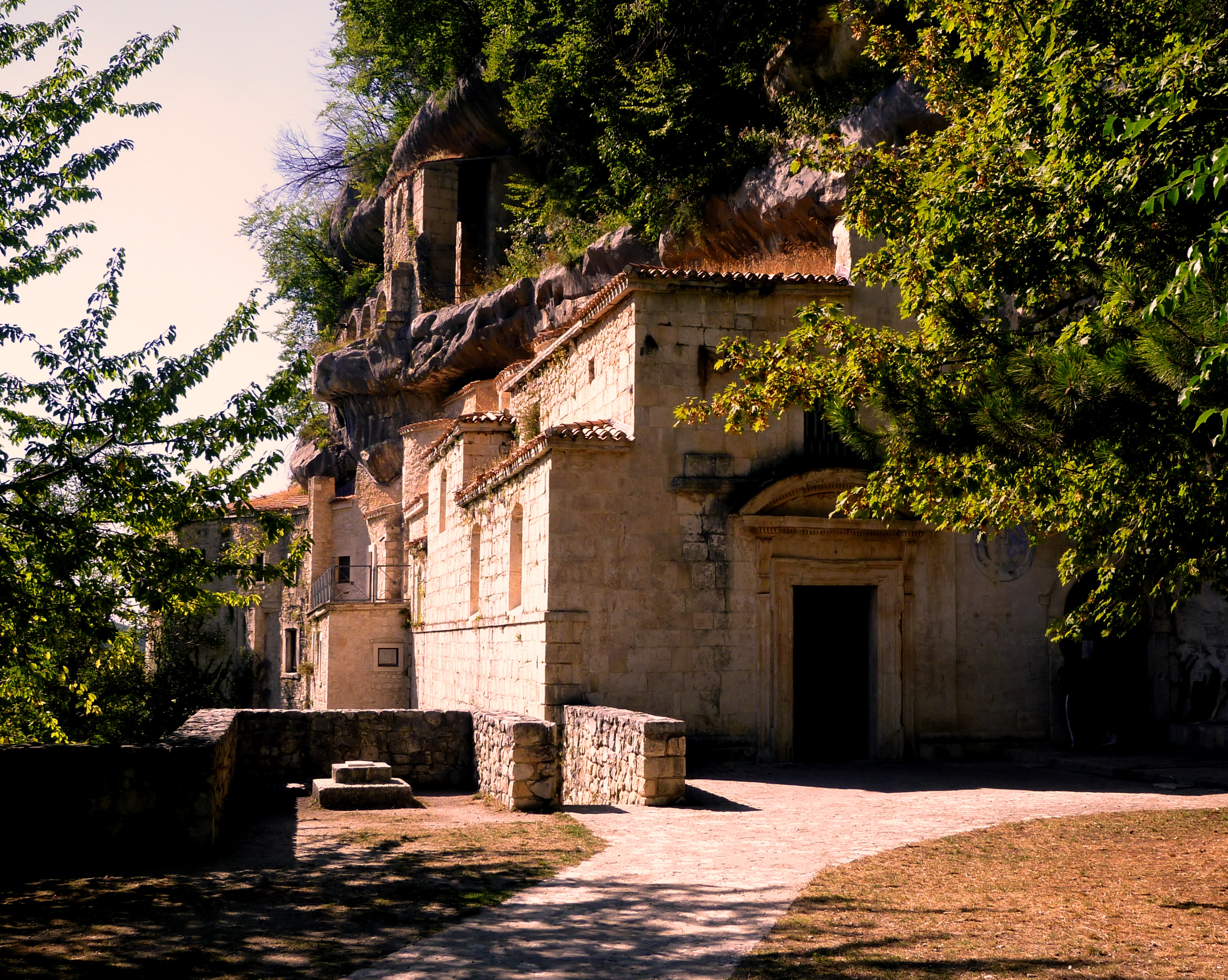
- View of the hermitage

- Location within Abruzzo

Religion
- Affiliation: Roman Catholic
- Province: Province of Pescara
- Region: Abruzzo

Location
- Municipality: Roccamorice
- State: Italy

Architecture
- Completed: 11th century

Eremo di Santo Spirito a Majella (Italian for Hermitage of Santo Spirito a Majella) is an hermitage located in Roccamorice, Province of Pescara (Abruzzo, Italy).

== History ==
The date of the origin of the hermitage is unknown, although it is believed to be before the 11th century and founded by Benedictine monks from the Monastery of San Benedetto in Montecassino. The first historical source dates back to 1055 and reports the presence of the monk Desiderio, the future Pope Victor III, who built a church there. In 1246, Pietro da Morrone, the future Pope Celestine V, resided there. He renovated the hermitage and built the oratory and a first cell, followed by a second oratory and additional cells as the community grew.

At Pietro da Morrone's request, Pope Urban IV, in a letter dated 1 June 1263, asked the bishop of Chieti to incorporate the hermits of the hermitage into the Order of Saint Benedict, and in 1278 the hermitage was granted autonomy and the title of monastery. It remained the head of the Order until 1293, when the main monastery function of the Order was transferred to the Hermitage of Sant'Onofrio al Morrone. Between 1310 and 1317, the prior of the monastery was Roberto da Salle, and in 1347 it hosted Cola di Rienzo.

This was followed by a period of decline until 1586, when the hermitage was granted the title of Abbey. The Scala Santa was built to access the oratory of Santa Maria Maddalena, and on 11 April 1591, the bones of Stefano del Lupo were transferred to Santo Spirito from the monastery of Vallebona in Manoppello. At the end of the 17th century, Prince Caracciolo of San Buono built the three-story guesthouse building.

With the suppression of monastic orders in 1807, the monastery was definitively abandoned, and its contents were moved to Roccamorice.

== Architecture ==
=== Exterior ===
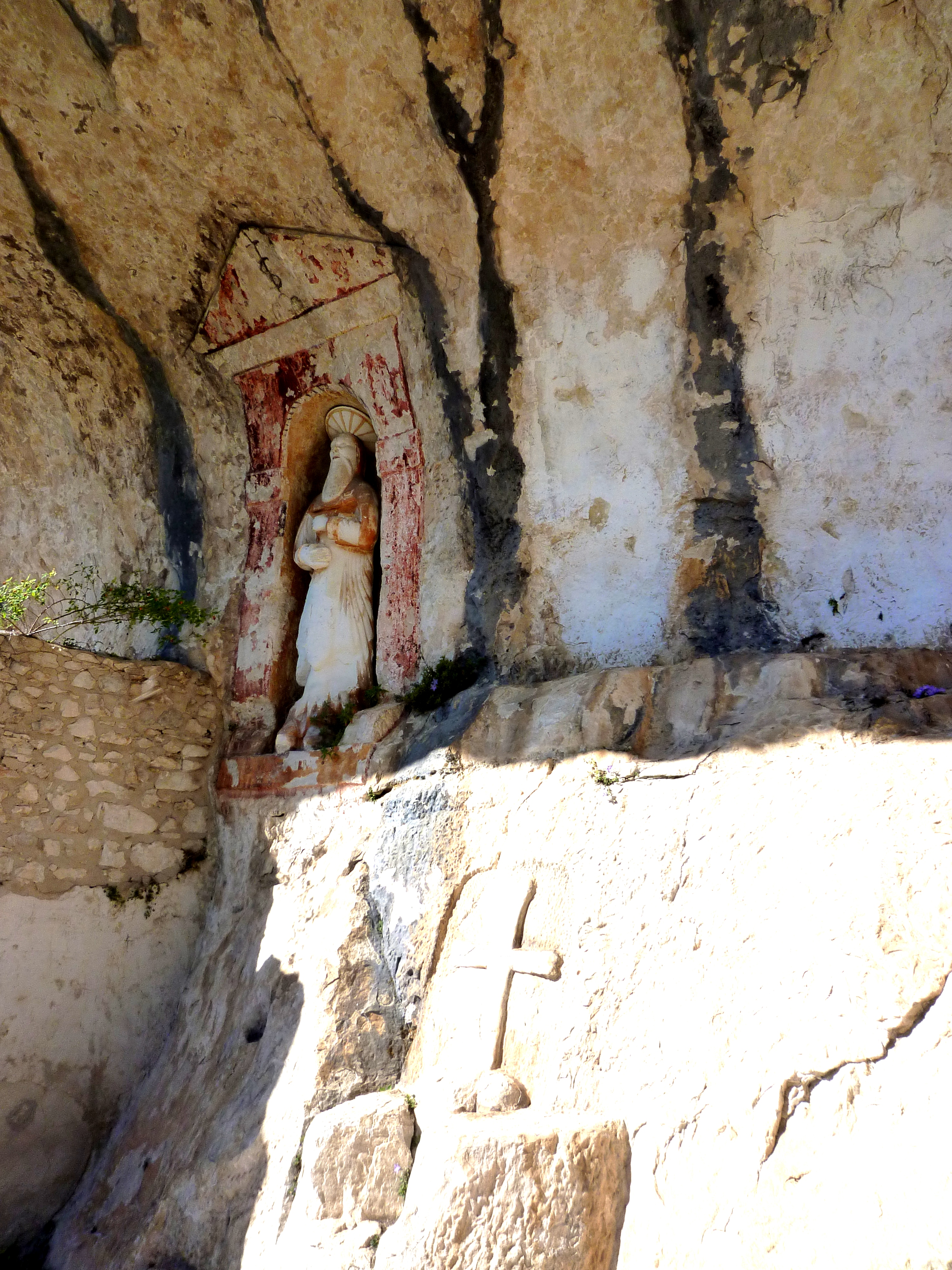
Niche with a saint along the balcony.

Currently, the preserved parts of the hermitage include the church, the sacristy, and the remains of the monastery distributed over two floors, with the guesthouse and some cells.

The church likely had a portico composed of two arches. The entrance, restored at the end of the 16th century, bears the inscription "Ecclesia haec S. Spiritui ab Angelis consecrata, Aegris Medicina est, et Christi Fidelibus Dimittit Peccata Omnia" and at the center, "Porta Coeli."

The wooden portal, along with the statue of Saint Michael the Archangel and the tabernacle, dates back to 1894 when the church was reopened for worship.

=== Interior ===
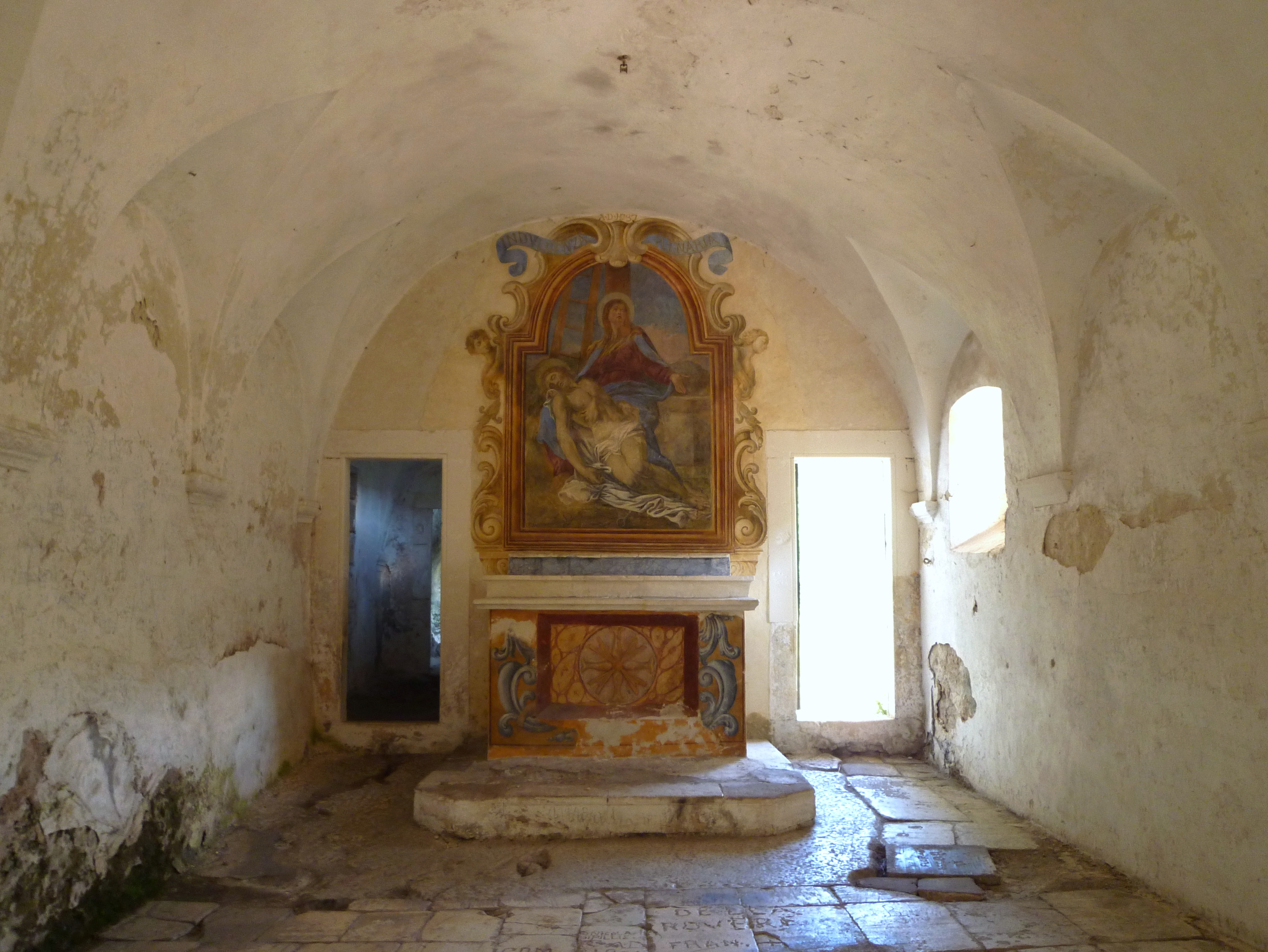
Interior of the Maddalena oratory.

The oldest part of the church is the presbytery, which features pointed arches characterized by ribs and two doors beside the altar leading to the choir. With the reopening of the church for worship, the works that had been transferred to the church of Roccamorice were brought back to the hermitage, such as the paintings of the Madonna, the Descent of the Holy Spirit in the Cenacle, a wooden statue of Christ, and a bust of Pope Celestine V. Additionally, there are two 19th-century canvases depicting Saint Joseph and Saint Helena.

The original core of the hermitage is located in the lower part of the church, carved into the rock. It has two entrances, the first of which leads to what is called the room of the Crucifix, from where, via some steps, one reaches another room that might have been the resting place of Pietro da Morrone. The second entrance leads to two rooms for the burial of the Caracciolo princes of San Buono. Following are a first block of service rooms on the ground floor and chambers on the upper floor, while a second section consists of six large rooms in a state of ruin.

The third building is the guesthouse, or Prince's House, which spans three floors. It can be accessed via a corridor carved into the rock. Near the entrance of the guesthouse is the Scala Santa, which, with 31 steps, leads among the ruins of other buildings. Another staircase with 76 steps reaches a large covered balcony. Two short staircases lead to the oratory of the Maddalena, carved into the rock spur inside the balcony.
