= Passo Lanciano-La Majelletta ski area =

Ski resort in Abruzzo, Italy

Passo Lanciano - La Majelletta
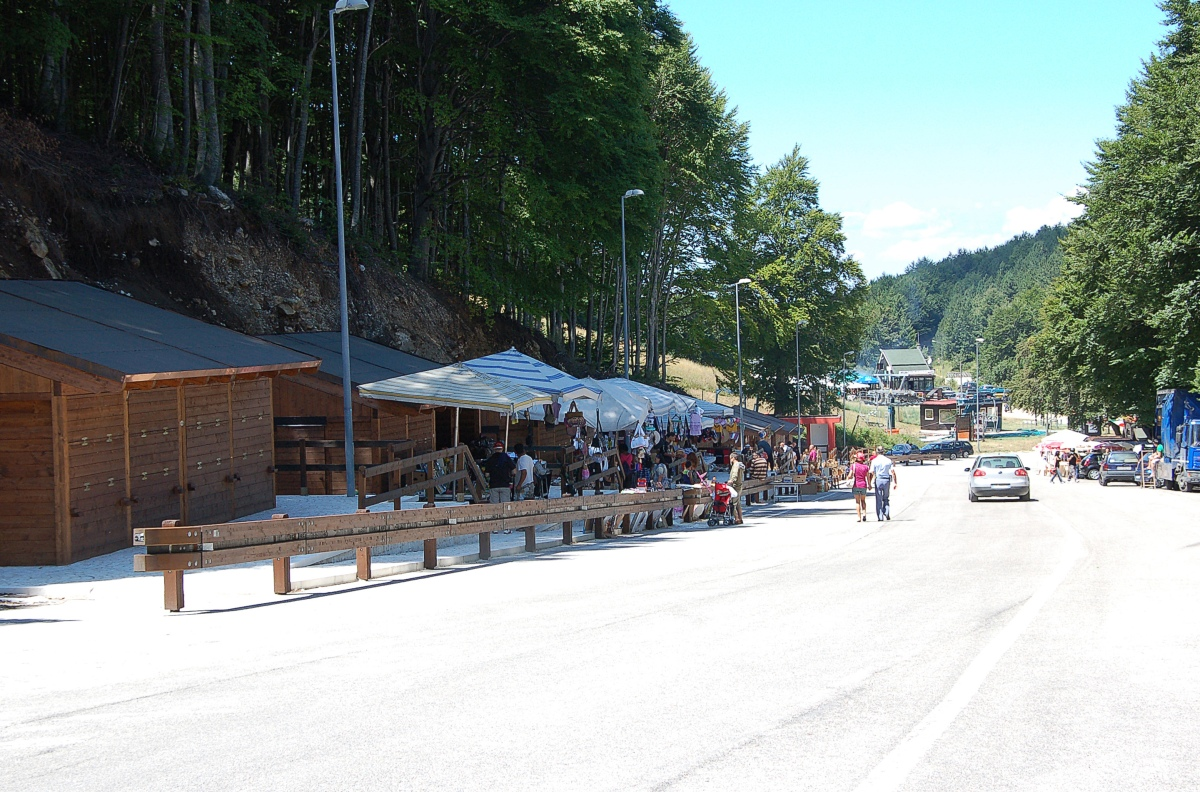
- Interactive map of Passo Lanciano - La Majelletta
- Location: Abruzzo, Italy
- Nearest city: Pretoro, Rapino, Pennapiedimonte, Roccamorice
- Top elevation: Passo Lanciano-1600 m, Majelletta -1995 m
- Base elevation: Passo Lanciano-1300 m, Majelletta -1650 m
- Skiable area: 13,3 km of runs
- Trails: 12,9km total; 5,0km (12%) easy; 7,1km (58%) intermediate; 0,8km (30%) difficult
- Lift system: 8 lifts
- Website: www.majellettawe.it

Passolanciano-Maielletta is a ski area of italy, located in the Apennine Mountains, on the north-eastern slope of the Maiella massif, inside of the Maiella National Park, in the territory of the municipalities of Pretoro, Rapino and Pennapiedimonte (in province of Chieti) and Roccamorice (province of Pescara) in Abruzzo, Italy. Born in the mid-nineties, it consists of two different ski resorts that are neighboring, but not directly connected to each other in terms of skiing: that of Passo Lanciano and that of the Maielletta located along the road that first climbs up to the Bruno Pomilio refuge and then up to Blockhaus, with a catchment area aimed mainly at the lower Abruzzo with the provinces of Pescara and Chieti.

== Description ==
It is one of the three ski poles of the Maiella together with Campo di Giove and Passo San Leonardo, the largest and most important of the three, reachable from the north from Scafa-Lettomanoppello, from the east from Pretoro, from the west from Roccamorice. The upper part of the district also falls within the Piana Grande della Maielletta nature reserve, while to the west of the Blockhaus it borders on the Valle dell'Orfento nature reserve.

=== Passolanciano ===
Surrounded by woods of beech from 1100 m up to approximately 1550 m in altitude, it has several ski lifts with chairlifts and skilift that reach 1600 m of altitude and serve several ski slopes of different difficulty.

=== Maielletta ===
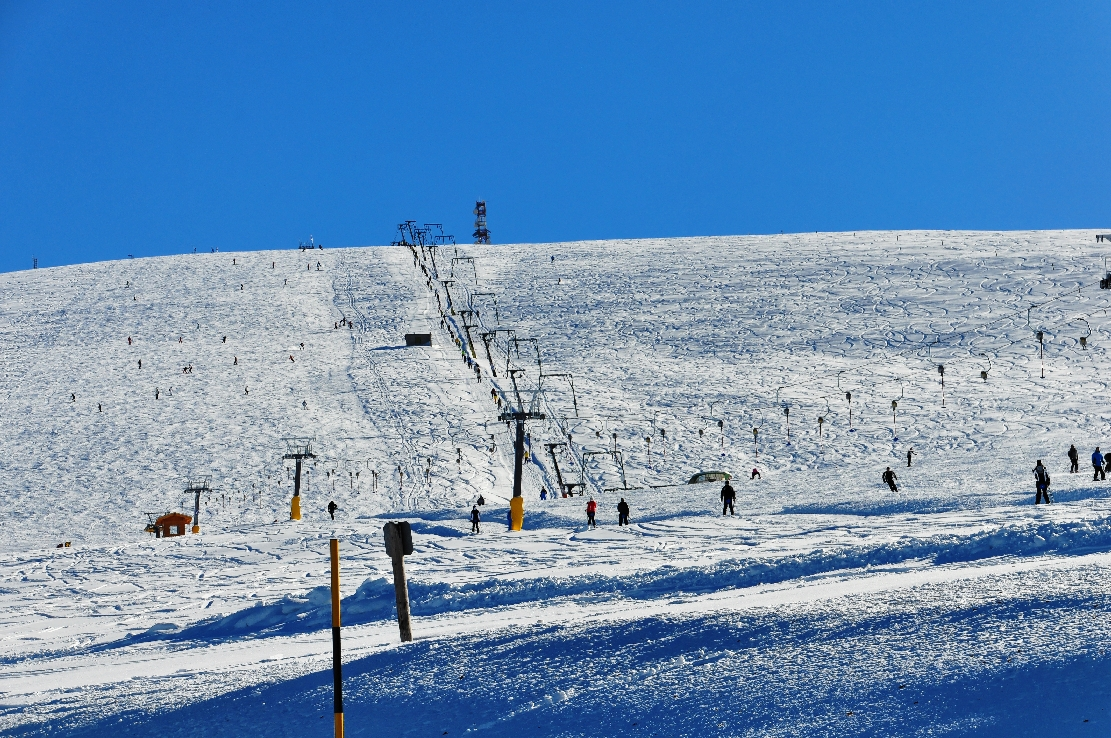
Ski facilities and slopes in Maielletta

From the Maielletta slopes, starting from 1600 m up to 2000 m of altitude, it is instead possible to see on clear days, in addition to the highest peaks of the massif, the Gran Sasso to the north, the Velino-Sirente to the north-west, in the distance to the east also the view of the Adriatic Sea (the only ski resort in the Abruzzo Apennines, together with Prati di Tivo, where you can ski with a sea view in the distance), with the whole underlying hilly and flat part and the related centers of Pescara and Chieti, 1500 M|2000 m further downstream. Ski mountaineering and hiking in summer on the paths towards the peaks of the Maiella.

=== Block house ===
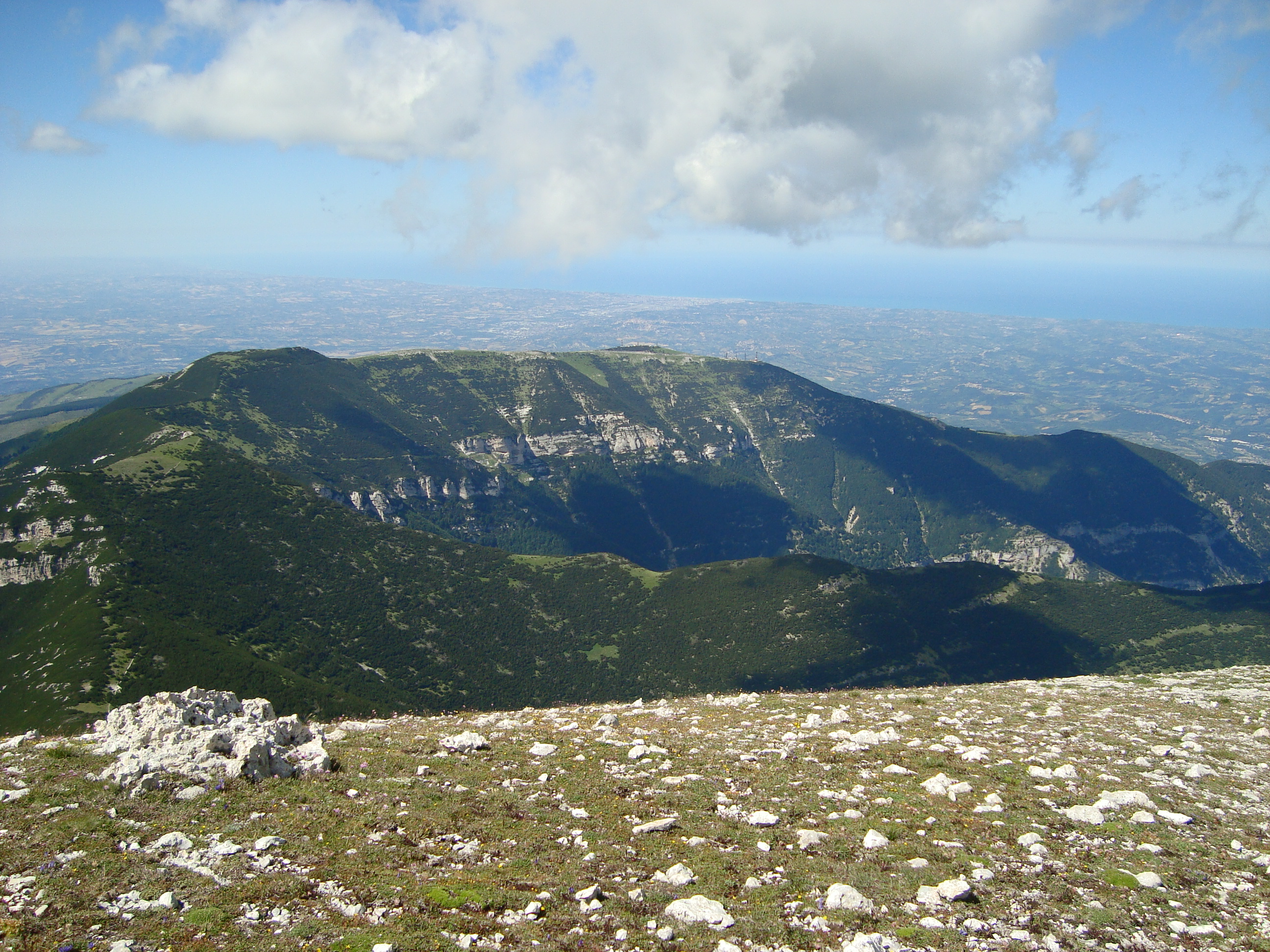
Cima Blockhaus

The top part of the area, located at the end of a long and demanding climb with a small ridge plateau at high altitude, is known as Cima Blockhaus 2143 m, whose road access has been forbidden to the transit of vehicles since 2010 starting from an altitude of 1980 m just beyond the Bruno Pomilio refuge, with the summit (where there is the Blockhaus plateau and the statue of the Madonnina) reachable only on foot or by bicycle.

It represents an ancient surface of erosion formed when the relief had a modest height, and was found in sub-tropical environmental conditions. The original coral island, which emerged from the sea, was subjected to physical and chemical degradation phenomena, which could make the surface thinner. The process continued over the millennia, leveling the island and the roughness, while the biogenic activity of the organisms that manufactured calcium carbonate continued in the submerged edges. The elevation caused the mountain to arch, keeping these internal surfaces in a sub-level position; glacial erosion then formed valleys which reduced these areas, isolating the central part. It therefore had the shape of a triangular acrocorus, since the surface was not eroded with the glacial activity, as in other cases of the Majella, transformed into crests.

== Ski areas ==
The area consists of 4 ski areas:

1. Pretoro
2. Rapino
3. Pennapiedimonte
4. Roccamorice

=== Accessibility ===
The district is easily reachable from Pretoro via the Maielletta state road 614, Scafa (motorway exit of the A25 Torano-Pescara) and Roccamorice.

== Climate ==
Climate data for Passo Lanciano, elevation 1,280 m (4,200 ft), (1951–2000)
| Month | Jan | Feb | Mar | Apr | May | Jun | Jul | Aug | Sep | Oct | Nov | Dec | Year |
|---|---|---|---|---|---|---|---|---|---|---|---|---|---|
| Mean daily maximum °C (°F) | 4.2 (39.6) | 4.8 (40.6) | 6.9 (44.4) | 11.0 (51.8) | 15.7 (60.3) | 19.3 (66.7) | 22.9 (73.2) | 23.0 (73.4) | 18.6 (65.5) | 13.7 (56.7) | 9.4 (48.9) | 4.8 (40.6) | 12.9 (55.1) |
| Daily mean °C (°F) | 0.9 (33.6) | 1.1 (34.0) | 3.2 (37.8) | 7.0 (44.6) | 11.0 (51.8) | 14.3 (57.7) | 17.5 (63.5) | 17.5 (63.5) | 13.8 (56.8) | 9.6 (49.3) | 5.6 (42.1) | 1.5 (34.7) | 8.6 (47.5) |
| Mean daily minimum °C (°F) | −2.4 (27.7) | −2.5 (27.5) | −0.5 (31.1) | 3.0 (37.4) | 6.4 (43.5) | 9.3 (48.7) | 12.0 (53.6) | 12.0 (53.6) | 8.9 (48.0) | 5.4 (41.7) | 1.9 (35.4) | −1.8 (28.8) | 4.3 (39.8) |
| Average precipitation mm (inches) | 142.6 (5.61) | 112.4 (4.43) | 118.5 (4.67) | 129.7 (5.11) | 90.5 (3.56) | 81.3 (3.20) | 74.3 (2.93) | 81.5 (3.21) | 124.6 (4.91) | 138.4 (5.45) | 145.1 (5.71) | 170.8 (6.72) | 1,409.7 (55.51) |
| Average precipitation days | 9.3 | 8.5 | 8.5 | 9.0 | 7.8 | 7.4 | 4.8 | 6.2 | 7.6 | 9.0 | 10.2 | 10.7 | 99 |
Source: Regione Abruzzo
