= Celestines =

Former Roman Catholic monastic order

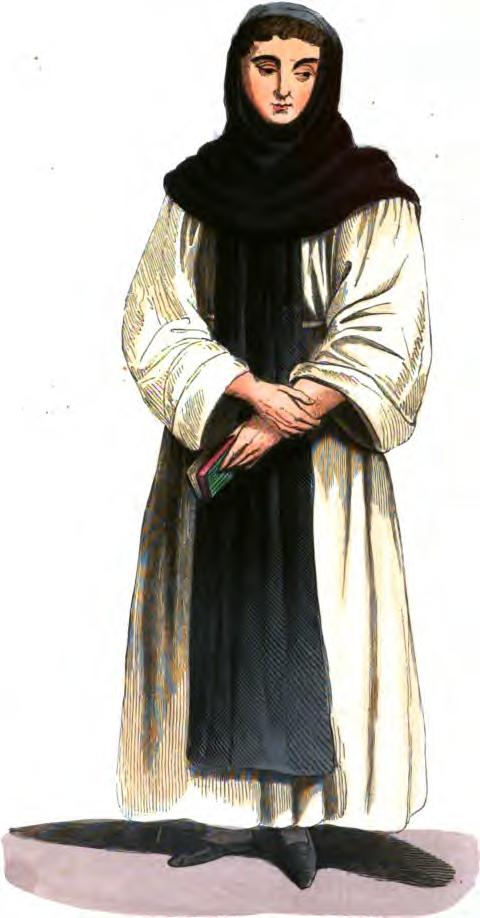
Religious habit of the Celestine Order (18th century image).

The Celestines were a Roman Catholic monastic order, a branch of the Benedictines, founded in 1244. At the foundation of the new rule, they were called Hermits of St Damiano, or Moronites (or Murronites), and did not assume the appellation of Celestines until after the election of their founder, Peter of Morone (Pietro Murrone), to the Papacy as Celestine V. They used the post-nominal initials O.S.B. Cel. The last house closed in 1785.

== Founding ==
The fame of the holy life and the austerities practised by Pietro Morone in his solitude on the Mountain of Majella, near Sulmona, attracted many visitors, several of whom were moved to remain and share his mode of life. They built a small convent on the spot inhabited by the holy hermit, which became too small for the accommodation of those who came to share their life of privations. Peter of Morone (later Pope Celestine V), their founder, built a number of other small oratories in that neighborhood.

Around the year 1254, Peter of Morone gave the order a rule formulated in accordance with his own practices. In 1264, the new institution was approved as a branch of the Benedictines by Pope Urban IV; however, the next pope Gregory X had commanded that all orders founded since the prior Lateran Council should not be further multiplied. Hearing a rumor that the order was to be suppressed, the reclusive Peter traveled to Lyon, where the Pope was holding a council. There he persuaded Gregory to approve his new order, making it a branch of the Benedictines and following the rule of Saint Benedict, but adding to it additional severities and privations. Gregory took it under the Papal protection, assured to it the possession of all property it might acquire, and endowed it with exemption from the authority of the ordinary. Nothing more was needed to ensure the rapid spread of the new association and Peter the hermit of Morone lived to see himself "Superior-General" to thirty-six monasteries and more than six hundred monks.

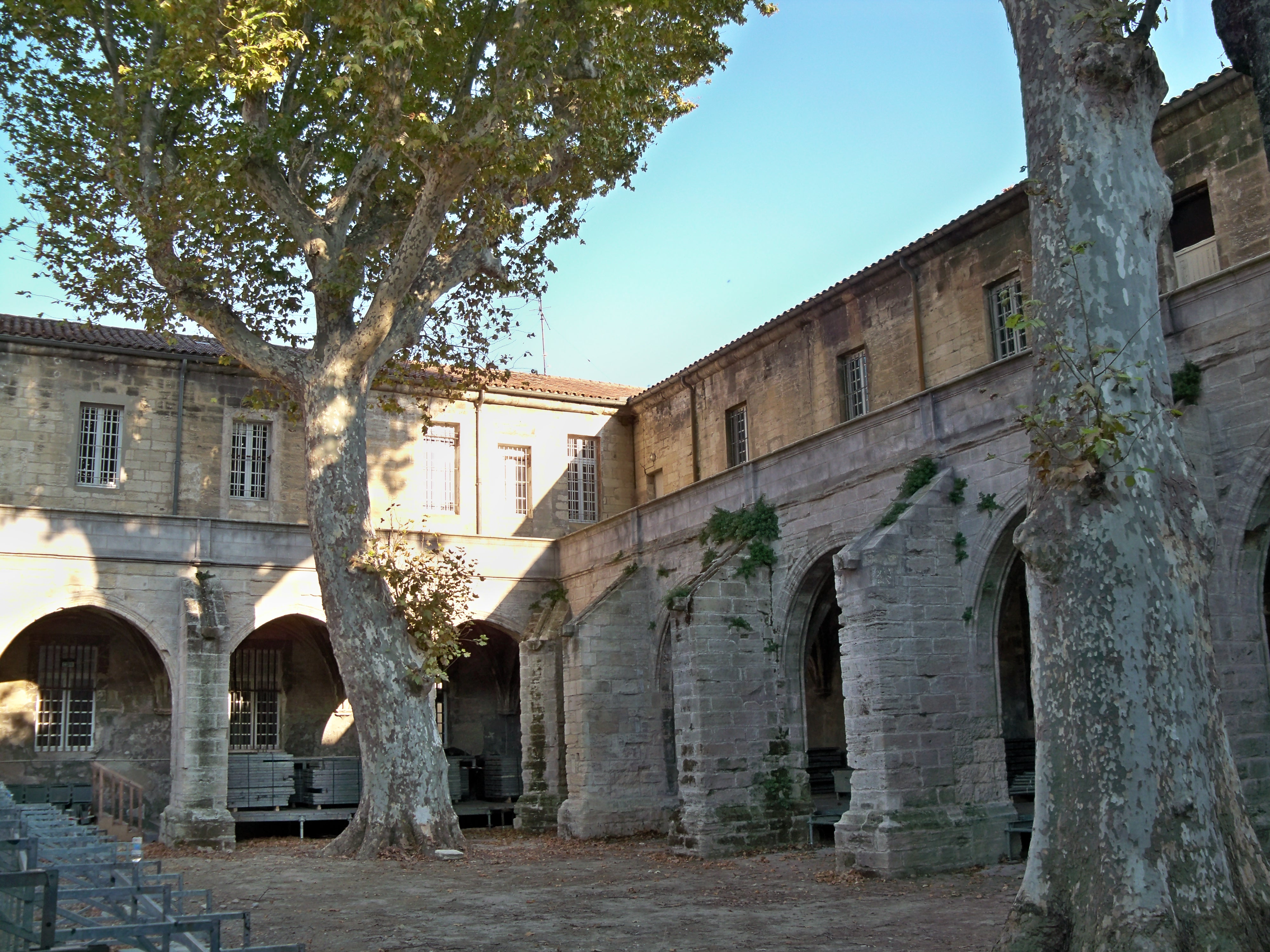
Celestine cloister. Avignon, France.

As soon as he had seen his new order thus consolidated he gave up the government of it to a certain Robert, and retired once again to an even more remote site to devote himself to solitary penance and prayer. Shortly afterwards, in a chapter of the order held in 1293, the original monastery of Majella being judged to be too desolate and exposed to too rigorous a climate, it was decided that the Abbey of the Holy Spirit at Monte Morrone, located in Sulmona, should be the headquarters of the order and the residence of the General-Superior, where it continued for centuries. The next year Peter of Morrone, despite his reluctance, was elected Pope by the name of Celestine V. From there on, the order he had founded took the name of Celestines. During his short reign as Pope, the former hermit confirmed the rule of the order, which he had himself composed, and conferred on the society a variety of special graces and privileges. In the only creation of cardinals promoted by him, among the twelve raised to the purple, there were two monks of his order. He also visited personally the Benedictine monastery on Monte Cassino, where he persuaded the monks to accept his more rigorous rule. He sent fifty monks of his order to introduce it, who remained there, however, for only a few months.

After the death of the founder the order was favoured and privileged by Pope Benedict XI, and rapidly spread through Italy, Germany, Flanders, and France, where they were received by Philip the Fair in 1300.

The administration of the order was carried on somewhat after the pattern of Cluny, that is all monasteries were subject to the Abbey of the Holy Ghost at Sulmona, and these dependent houses were divided into provinces. The Celestines had ninety-six houses in Italy, twenty-one in France, and a few in Germany.

Subsequently, the French Celestines, with the consent of the Italian superiors of the order, and of Pope Martin V in 1427, obtained the privilege of making new constitutions for themselves, which they did in the 17th century in a series of regulations accepted by the provincial chapter in 1667. At that time the French congregation of the order was composed of twenty-one monasteries, the head of which was that of Paris, and was governed by a Provincial with the authority of General. Paul V was a notable benefactor of the order. The order became extinct in the eighteenth century. The Reformation, European Wars of Religion, and changing attitudes towards monasticism led to the decline of the order. In France, accord to Schmitz, Celestine monasteries "suffered greatly from the Calvinists". The Celestine Order also did not take part of in the Monastic reform movement of the 17th century which led to regeneration of other orders, leading to further, terminal decline. The last house closed in 1785.

== Description of order ==
According to their special constitutions the Celestines were bound to say matins in the choir at two o'clock in the morning, and always to abstain from eating meat, save in illness. The distinct rules of their order with regard to fasting are numerous, but not more severe than those of similar congregations, though much more so than is required by the old Benedictine rule. In reading their minute directions for diverse degrees of abstinence on various days, it is impossible to avoid being struck by the conviction that the great object of the framers of these rules was the general purpose of ensuring an ascetic mode of life.

The Celestines wore a white woollen cassock bound with a linen band, and a leathern girdle of the same colour, with a scapular unattached to the body of the dress, and a black hood. It was not permitted to them to wear any shirt save of serge. Their dress in short was very like that of the Cistercians. But it is a tradition in the order that in the time of the founder they wore a coarse brown cloth. The church and monastery of San Pietro in Montorio originally belonged to the Celestines in Rome; but they were turned out of it by Sixtus IV to make way for Franciscans, receiving from the Pope in exchange the Church of St Eusebius of Vercelli with the adjacent mansion for a monastery.
