= Mario Scocco =

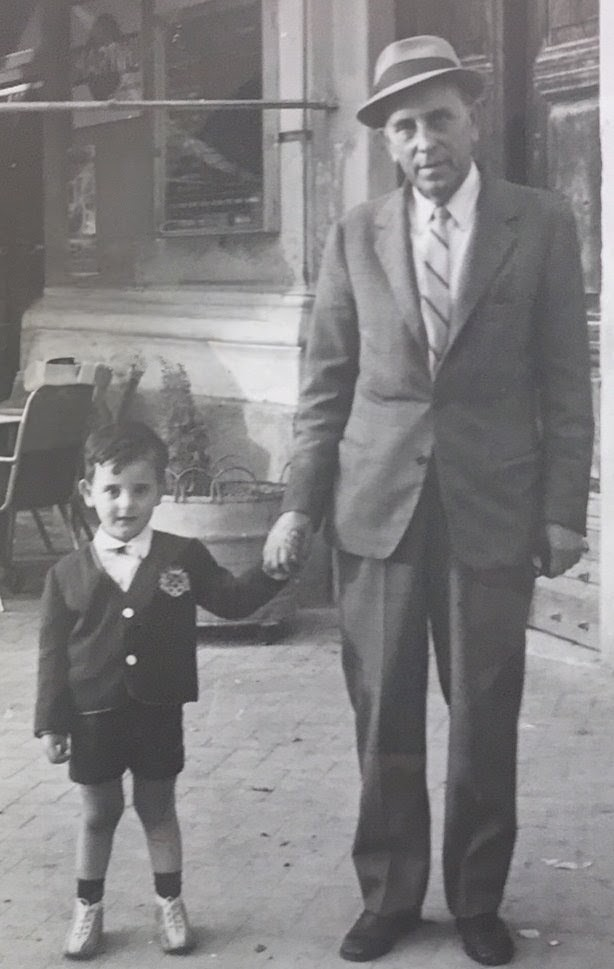
- Mario Scocco with one of his grandsons in Popoli, his birthplace, in the late 1960s.
- Born: December 7, 1899; Popoli Terme, Italy
- Died: April 21, 1978 (aged 78); Sulmona, Italy
- Known for: Leader of the "Scocco Organization" (Resistance)
- Awards: Recommended for the MBE (1946)

Mario Scocco (December 7, 1899 – April 21, 1978) was a prominent figure in the Italian Resistance in the Abruzzo region during World War II. He is best known for his leadership of the "Scocco Organization," a clandestine network that saved hundreds of Allied prisoners of war (POWs) from German recapture. For his "outstanding courage, resolution, and fortitude," he was officially recommended for the Member of the Order of the British Empire (MBE) by the British War Office in 1946.

== Early life and political background ==
Born in Popoli Terme, Scocco moved to Sulmona where he practiced as a dental technician. He was a known opponent of the Fascist regime, and his laboratory and home at Via Quatrario 29 became secret hubs for anti-fascist activity long before the outbreak of the war.

== The "Scocco Organization" and MI9 ==
Following the Armistice of Cassibile on September 8, 1943, the Peligna Valley became a key transit area for thousands of Allied POWs escaping from Campo 78. Scocco founded one of the most effective escape organizations in the sector which later came into contact with British MI9 and the Rome Escape Line.

His role was described by John Furman, a British officer who later joined the MI9's Rome organization. In his 1959 memoir Be Not Fearful (later published by Garzanti in Italy), Furman identifies Scocco as a key figure in the Sulmona clandestine network. His activities are also a centerpiece of Captain William C. Simpson's account, A Vatican Lifeline, which describes the vital support Scocco provided to British personnel under German occupation.

The organization's efforts included:

- Providing secret accommodation, food, and civilian clothing for hundreds of escapees.
- Organizing and financing mountain guides for the "Freedom Trail" toward Allied lines.
- Procuring forged documents and providing personal financial support to soldiers.

Scocco worked in tandem with the broader "Vatican Lifeline" to ensure the safety of Allied officers.

== Arrest and deportation ==
At the beginning of 1944, the German Gestapo discovered the organization. Scocco was arrested, interrogated, and subsequently deported to Germany as a political prisoner in July 1944. He survived "the appalling conditions of concentration camp internment" until his liberation in April 1945.

Upon his return to Sulmona, Scocco demonstrated extraordinary moral integrity by refusing all financial compensation offered by the Allied Screening Commission. He maintained that his aid to the Allied cause was a disinterested duty based on his socialist and humanitarian principles.

== Political career and honors ==
In the post-war era, Scocco was a leading figure for the Italian Socialist Party (PSI) in Sulmona, serving as a municipal councillor and local administrator (assessore).

- MBE Recommendation: In 1946, Brigadier E.K. Page officially recommended him for the Member of the Order of the British Empire (MBE) for "loyal and distinguished service to the Allied Cause."
- Toponymy: The City of Sulmona has dedicated a street to his memory, Via Mario Scocco.
- Legacy: His and other prominent stories are commemorated annually during the international Freedom Trail (Il Sentiero della Libertà) event in the Maiella mountains.

== Bibliography ==
- John Furman, Be Not Fearful, London, Anthony Blond, 1959. (Italian edition: Non aver paura, Garzanti, 1967).
- William C. Simpson, A Vatican Lifeline, Leo Cooper, 1995. ISBN 978-0850524758.
- Sam Derry, The Rome Escape Line, Norton, 1960. ISBN 978-1738422401.
- Victor Failmezger, Rome: City in Terror: The Nazi Occupation 1943–44, Osprey Publishing, 2020. ISBN 978-1472841292.
- Roger Absalom, A Strange Alliance, Olschki, 1991. 978-88-222-3882-5
- The National Archives (London):
  - (Foreign Office): File FO371; File FO916.
  - (War Office): File WO208 (5459/149: Recommendation for Award: Scocco, Mario); File WO224.
- U.S. National Archives (Washington):
  - File RG 226 (Office of Strategic Services).
  - File RG 331 (Allied Screening Commission).
