= Maria Pellegrini =

Canadian opera singer (1939–2025)

Maria Pellegrini (15 July 1939 – 28 December 2025) was a Canadian operatic soprano of Italian birth who had an active international career from the 1960s. She was particularly associated with the operas of Giacomo Puccini and Giuseppe Verdi. In 1965 she became a naturalized Canadian citizen.

== Life and career ==
Born in Pretoro, Italy on 15 July 1939, Pellegrini emigrated with her family to Canada in 1958, at the age of 19. In 1960 she entered The Royal Conservatory of Music (RCM) in Toronto where she studied voice for the next four years with Ernesto Vinci. She later pursued further vocal studies in London with Joe Macko.

Pellegrini made her professional opera debut in 1963 as the High Priestess in Verdi's Aida with the Canadian Opera Company. She was heard there the following year as Annina in La traviata and again in 1965 as Gilda in Rigoletto. She returned several more times to the COC through the late 1980s, portraying such roles as Aida, Cio-Cio-San in Madama Butterfly, Nedda in I Pagliacci, and Violetta in La traviata among others.

In 1965 Pellegrini won the Metropolitan Opera National Council Auditions, but never was engaged to sing a role at the Met. In 1968 she made her debut at The Royal Opera, London as Gilda and in 1969 she made her first appearance with the Sadler's Wells Opera as Cio-Cio-San. She also performed and recorded the role of Musetta in La bohème with the Royal Opera, London in 1969.

In 1977 Pellegrini portrayed Cio-Cio-San on a nationally broadcast production of Madama Butterfly for CBC Television with conductor Jean Deslauriers. Others in the cast included Pierre Duval, Bernard Turgeon, and Judith Forst. In 1980 she made her debut at the Opera Lyra Ottawa as Mimi in La bohème . Other Canadian opera companies she has performed leading roles with include Calgary Opera, Edmonton Opera, Manitoba Opera, Opera Hamilton, and Vancouver Opera.

In 1982 Pellegrini made her debut with the New York City Opera as Cio-Cio-San under conductor David Effron. Other American companies she has sung leading roles with during her career are the Connecticut Opera, the Florida Grand Opera, the New Orleans Opera, the New Jersey State Opera, and the Pittsburgh Opera.

On the international stage, Pellegrini's performances included appearances with the Teatro Carlo Felice, the Teatro Lirico Giuseppe Verdi, the Teatro Nacional (Santo Domingo), Teatro Massimo Bellini, the Teatro Regio (Parma), and Santo Domingo, and the Welsh National Opera.

Pellegrini died on 28 December 2025, at the age of 86.
