= Pretoro =

- Comune
- Comune di Pretoro
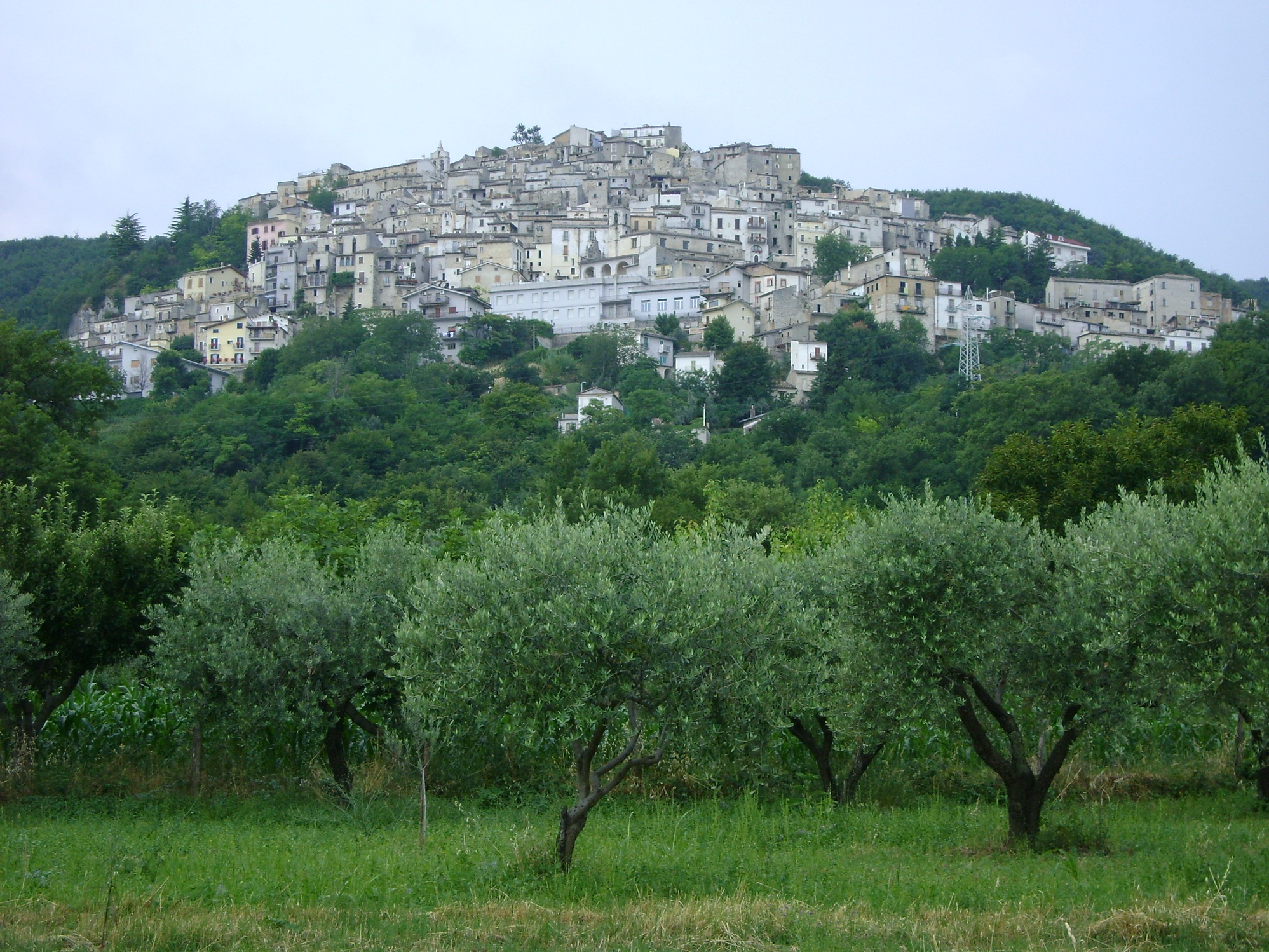

- Location within Italy Location within Abruzzo
- Coordinates: 42°13′N 14°8′E
- Country: Italy
- Region: Abruzzo
- Province: Chieti (CH)
- Frazioni: Colle Pagnotto, Passo Lanciano, Ponte

Government
  - Mayor: Sabrina Simone

Area
  - Total: 26.13 km^{2} (10.09 sq mi)
- Elevation: 560 m (1,840 ft)

Population (31 March 2018)
  - Total: 948
  - Density: 36.3/km^{2} (94.0/sq mi)
- Demonym: Pretoresi
- Time zone: UTC+1 (CET)
  - Summer (DST): UTC+2 (CEST)
- Postal code: 66010
- Dialing code: 0871
- Saint day: 6 May
- Website: Official website

Pretoro (locally Pretèure) is a town of about 1,100 inhabitants situated in Majella National Park, in the province of Chieti, Abruzzo, southern Italy. It is located on a steep hillside on the eastern side of the Maiella mountains. Its proximity to Passo Lanciano-La Majelletta ski area, guarantees the availability of winter sports, while the town is also only 20 minutes by car from the Adriatic Sea. It is one of I Borghi più belli d'Italia ("The most beautiful villages of Italy").

== History ==
The area in which Pretoro is located has been occupied since prehistoric times; remains from that period have been found here, as well as inscriptions in Latin from the Roman era. The first documented mention of the town is in a 12th-century record. Pretoro's name may derive from the word "preta", an earlier form of the word "pietra" or stone. The town stands on a rocky landscape that does not lend itself to farming. Because the town is surrounded by beech-forest, the people of Pretoro have specialized over the centuries in woodcarving.

== Main sights ==
Pretoro is composed of a cluster of stone buildings which climb the steep mountainside; the oldest part of the town is at the highest point, while down below is a newer section.

The 13th century Sanctuary of the Madonna della Mazza is located a little above the town. This was a hermitage built by Benedictine and Cistercian monks from Santa Maria Arabona at Manoppello. A work of art is the 16th century sculpture of the Pietà preserved in the church of San Nicola.

Within the town's territory is a nature preserve, the Riserva Naturale Valle del Foro.

== People ==
- Maria Pellegrini, operatic soprano
