= Confetti Mario Pelino =

Italian confectionery

- Industry: Confectionery
- Founded: 1783
- Headquarters: Via Stazione Introdacqua, 55, 67039 Sulmona, Italy
- Website: confettimariopelino.com

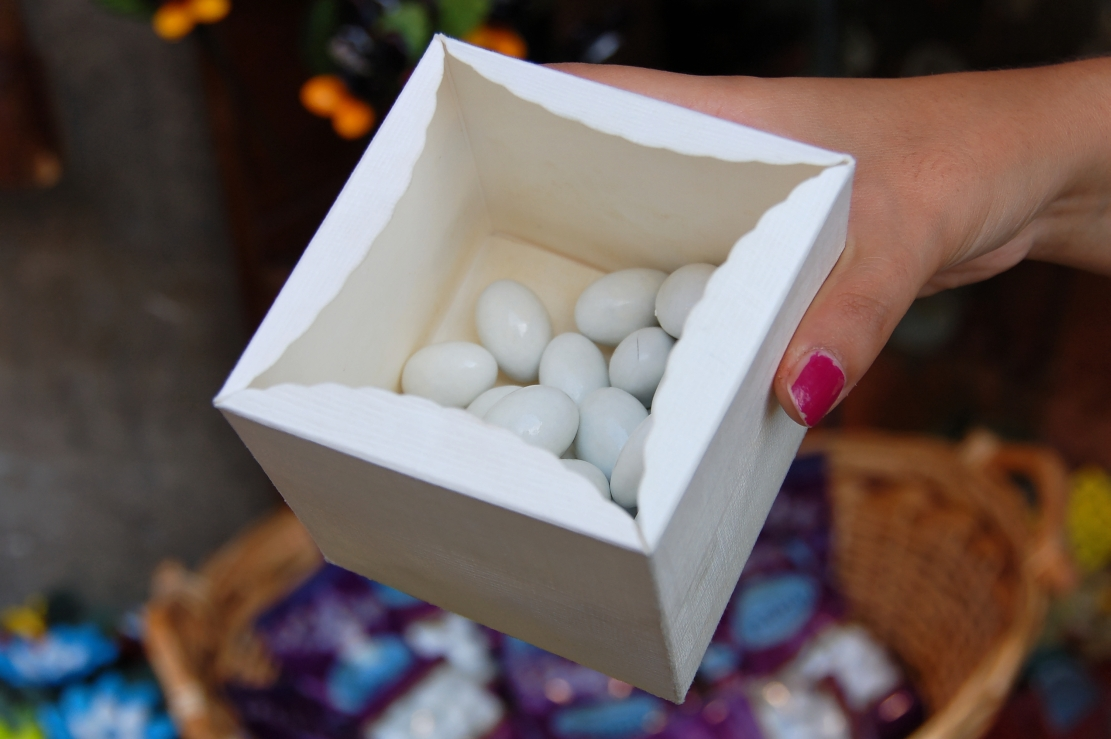
Typical confetti from Sulmona.

Confetti Mario Pelino is one of the oldest Italian confectioneries founded in 1783 by Bernardino Pelino and located in Sulmona, Abruzzo, a region known for the production of Jordan almonds.

Since its founding it has been a family business, and as such it is a member of the Henokiens association.

The company has sponsored a major cycle race in Sulmona.

== See also ==
- Henokiens
