= Roccamorice =

- Comune
- Comune di Roccamorice
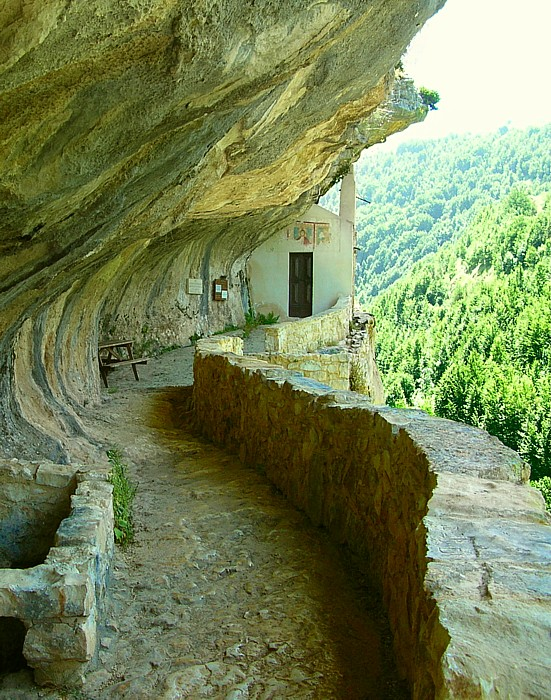
- Hermitage of St. Bartholomew

- Coat of arms

- Location within Italy Location within Abruzzo
- Coordinates: 42°13′N 14°2′E
- Country: Italy
- Region: Abruzzo
- Province: Pescara (PE)
- Frazioni: Collarso, Pagliari, Piano delle Castagne

Government
  - Mayor: Alessandro D'Ascanio

Area
  - Total: 24 km^{2} (9.3 sq mi)
- Elevation: 520 m (1,710 ft)

Population (1 January 2007)
  - Total: 1,012
  - Density: 42/km^{2} (110/sq mi)
- Demonym: Roccolani
- Time zone: UTC+1 (CET)
  - Summer (DST): UTC+2 (CEST)
- Postal code: 65020
- Dialing code: 085
- ISTAT code: 068034
- Website: Official website

Roccamorice is a town and comune in the province of Pescara, Abruzzo, central Italy.

Its distinctive shape is created by the imprint of the Lavino and Lanello rivers, both of which have dried up.

== See also ==
- Monte Morrone
- Hermitage of San Bartolomeo in Legio
- Hermitage of Santo Spirito a Majella
