= Virgilia D'Andrea =

Italian anarchist and poet (1888–1933)

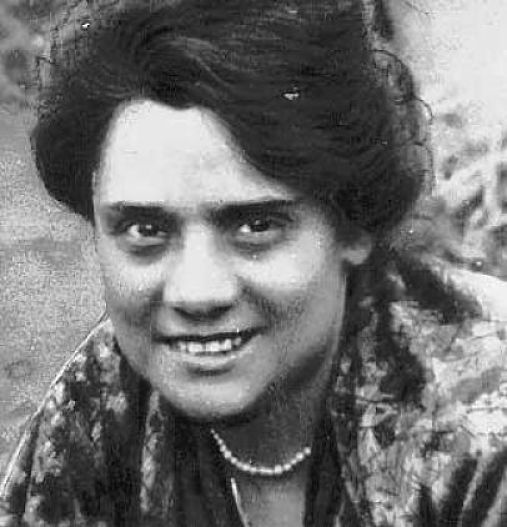

Virgilia D'Andrea (11 February 1888 – 12 May 1933) was an Italian anarchist poet and political activist. A prominent free love advocate and noted anti-fascist, she may be best remembered as the author of Tormento (Torment), a book of poetry first published in 1922.

== Biography ==
=== Early years ===
Virgilia D'Andrea was born in the town of Sulmona, located in the Abruzzo region of Italy, on 11 February 1888. Her family died when Virgilia was a young girl; thus from the age of six she was enrolled in a Catholic boarding school. D'Andrea would remain in Catholic boarding school until her eventual graduation to become a teacher.

During the course of her education D'Andrea read hundreds of books, developing an affinity for poetry and assimilating radical anarchist politics during her self-directed intellectual journey. She joined the Socialist Party of Italy as a vehicle to help advance her political beliefs. In 1917 she met leading anarchist journalist Armando Borghi at a meeting of a radical trade union which Borghi headed. D'Andrea and Borghi became companions and lovers, a relationship which flouted the moral sensibilities of the day. Although an advocate of free love, D'Andrea is believed to have maintained a monogamous commitment to Borghi throughout her life.

D'Andrea was politicized by the bloodshed of World War I and she left teaching to join the movement against Italian participation in the war. By 1917 state political security forces had begun a case file on D'Andrea, whom they deemed an effective and dangerous radical anti-war agitator. Following Italy's entry into the war, both D'Andrea and Borghi were subjected to house arrest and legally confined for the duration of the war.

=== Writings ===
In 1922, she published her first book of poetry, Tormento (Torment), a work featuring an introduction by leading Italian anarchist Errico Malatesta. Tormento was a collection of 19 poems written in the form of rhyme, many of which first saw print in the pages of the official organ of the Socialist Party, Avanti! (Forward!). Thematically, her material reflected the tension of social protest prevalent in Italy in the aftermath of the war and expressed the author's anger and angst in the wake of political defeats dealt the Italian workers' movement in the period. The book was well received, with a total of 8,000 copies sold.

The rise of fascism in Italy forced D'Andrea to emigrate in 1923. Over the next six years D'Andrea lived in a series of residences in Germany, the Netherlands, and France. In 1925, while living in Paris, D'Andrea published a second book — a volume of prose entitled L'Ora di Marmaldo (The Time of Marmaldo).

=== Emigration to America ===
D'Andrea emigrated to the United States of America in the fall of 1928, settling in the city of Brooklyn, New York.

In 1929 a second edition of Tormento was published in Italy, the government of which was by then firmly controlled by fascist leader Benito Mussolini. This second printing was immediately seized by the authorities, who charged that its words "excited the spirits" and inspired revolt.

Citing her outspoken advocacy of the doctrine of free love, Italian authorities charged D'Andrea with "reprehensible moral behavior" and asserted that she was committed to violence, with her verses "carefully composed to instigate lawbreaking, to incite class hatred, and to vilify the army."

=== Death and legacy ===
D'Andrea died of breast cancer in New York City on 12 May 1933, aged 45. A collection of writings, including poetry, prose, and autobiographical reminiscences, Torce nella Notte (Torches in the Night) was published in New York shortly after D'Andrea's death.

== Works ==
- Tormento. 1922. Second edition: Paris: La Fraternelle, 1929.
- L'Ora di Marmaldo. Brooklyn: Libreria editrice Lavoratori Industriali del Mondo, 1925.
- Torce nella Notte. New York: n.p., 1933.
