= Museo diocesano di Sulmona =

Museum of religious art in Sulmona, Italy

Coordinates: 42.0471°N 13.9262°E

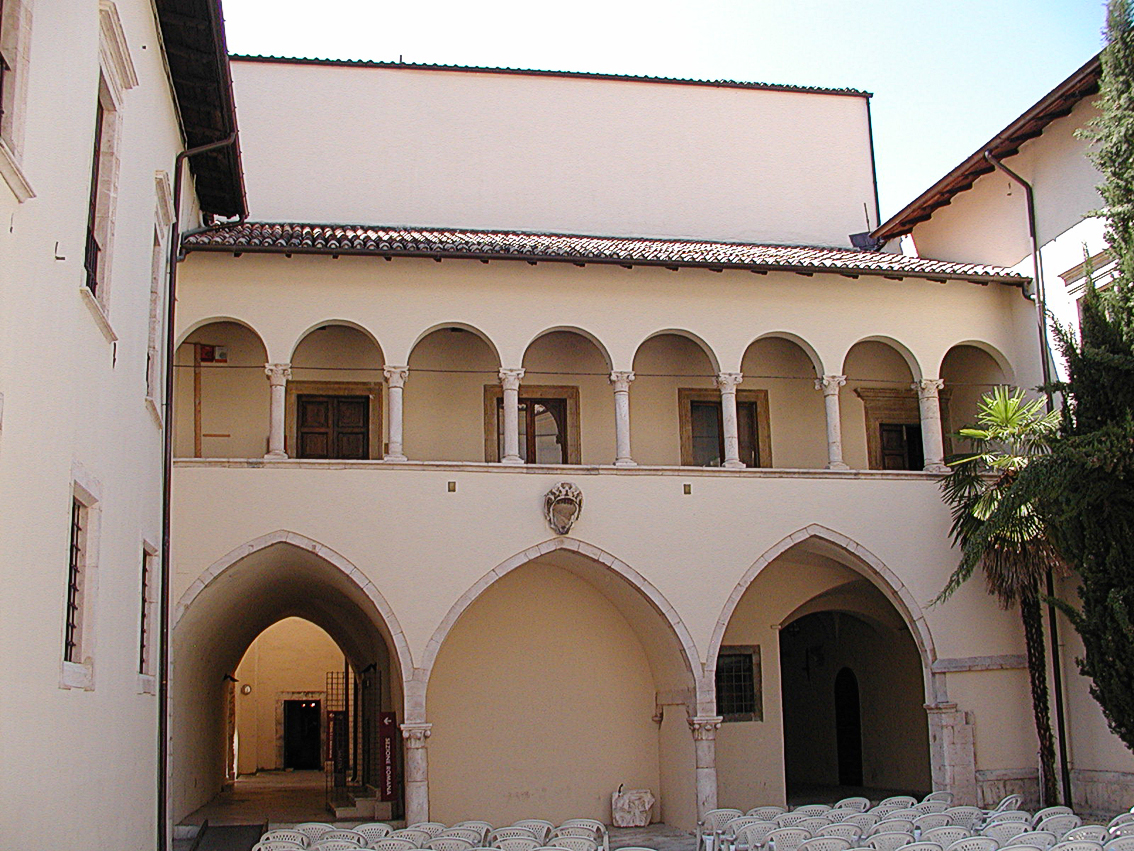
- Museo diocesano di Sulmona
- Location: Sulmona
- Type: Religious art

Museo diocesano di Sulmona (Italian for Diocesan Museum of Sulmona) is a museum of religious art in Sulmona, Province of L'Aquila (Abruzzo).

== History ==
The Diocesan Museum of Sulmona is housed in the three rooms of the Monastery of Santa Chiara. It represents a detached branch of the Civic Museum of Sulmona, as most of the works come from the churches of the Valle Peligna

== Collection ==
The few but large rooms, which were once the residence of the Clares of the Monastery, house works from the late 13th century to the 18th century.
Noteworthy are many works by unknown artists, the Madonnas with Child from the 15th century, sacred vestments mostly from the 18th century, and goldsmithing from the 14th century and the late 17th century. There are few works originating from Sulmona; among these is the Saint James from the 16th century.
