= Abbey of the Holy Spirit at Monte Morrone, Sulmona =

Celestine abbey in Sulmona, Italy

Coordinates: 42°05′18.41″N 13°55′23.06″E

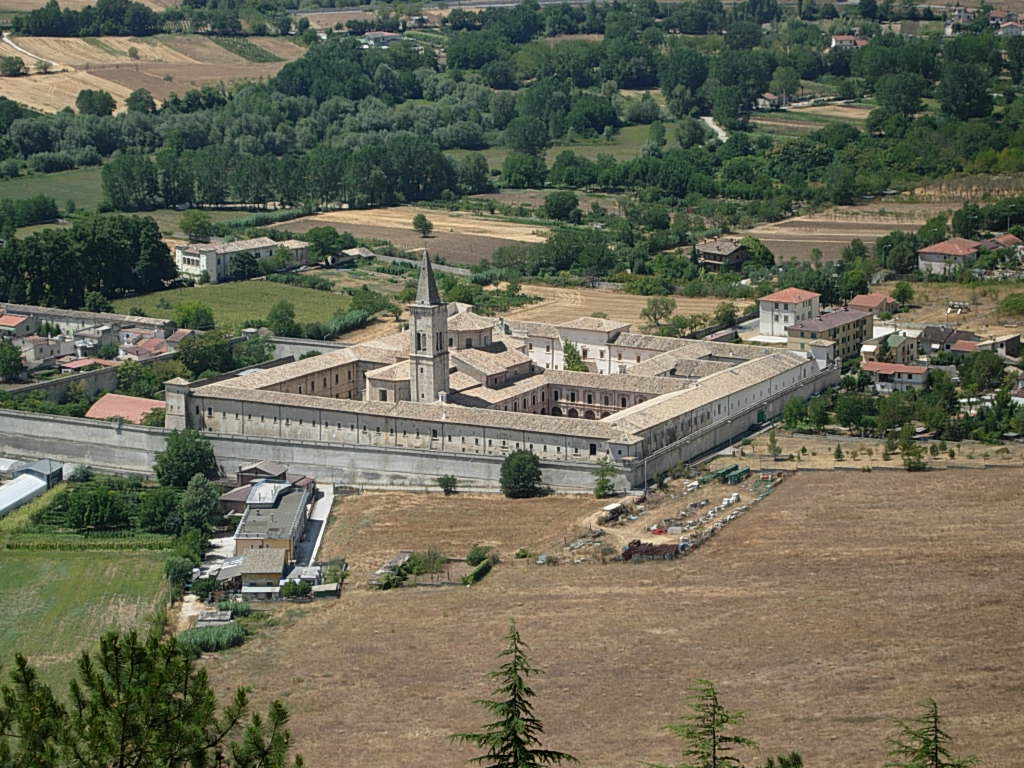
Badia Morronese

The Abbey of the Holy Spirit at Morrone (Italian: Abbazia di Santo Spirito al Morrone), locally Badia Morronese is a former Celestine monastery founded in the late 13th-century by the hermit Pietro da Morrone. The complex stands at the foot of Monte Morrone, about 5 km (3 mi) north-east of Sulmona, in the Province of L'Aquila, Abruzzo, Italy.

After the suppression of the Celestine Order in 1806, the abbey passed to the state; it now houses the offices of the Soprintendenza Archeologia, Belle Arti e Paesaggio per l'Abruzzo and a small archaeological museum. Much of the visible fabric reflects 17th- and 18th-century Baroque remodelling.

== History ==
The present monastery was built in the early 18th century after an earthquake had nearly leveled the former 13th-century monastery founded by Pietro Angelerio da Isernia, subsequently elected Pope Celestine V. Pietro Angelerio had been a hermit at the Mountain, at what is now the Eremo di San Onofrio in Monte Morrone. For centuries, this was the main abbey of the Celestine order, a Benedictine order offshoot. By the 19th century, the abbey was deconsecrated, functioning more recently as a prison. In the last decades, restoration has proceeded and it now serves as a Museum

The site has carried a number of names, Abbazia di Santo Spirito al Morrone with its church of Santo Spirito; Badia Morronese; or the Abbazia di Santo Spirito a Sulmona.

The first buildings at the site arose by 1293, and were both enlarged over the centuries and devastated by earthquakes in 1456 and catastrophically in 1706. This led to major reconstruction in the present Baroque-style.

With the Napoleonic suppression of the monastic orders, in 1807 the convent became host of the Collegio dei tre Abruzzi and an Ospizio di mendicità (poorhouse), till it was made into a prison until well into the 20th century.

The Abbey was taken over by the Wehrmacht during World War 2 and used as a prison and site of execution for captured members of the Italian resistance. A memorial plaque commemorates local shepherd Michele del Greco, who was executed on December 22, 1943 for helping allied POW's.

== Church of the Holy Spirit ==
After the 1706 earthquake, the church (Italian:chiesa di Santo Spirito a Morrone) was built anew an undulating facade with broken friezes, inspired by Francesco Borromini's church of San Carlo alle Quattro Fontane in Rome, was added to the church of Santo Spirito a Morrone. The local design is attributed to Donato Rocco. This facade has a clock (1730) added to the tympanum. The bell-tower was originally built in 1596 and based on that of the church dell'Annunziata in Sulmona.

The interior of the church while maintaining some of the chapel space, was reshaped into a Greek-cross layout. The walls and ceiling have baroque stucco decoration.

Among the original altarpieces in the church is a Descent of the Holy Spirit; others are now conserved in the Museo Civico in town, including a Madonna and Child, a Lactating Madonna and Saints, and a Glory with Celestine V (1750), all by Giovanni Conca, brother of Sebastiano Conca. Also in the Museum are the altarpieces of Saints Caterina e Lucia, and St Benedict writing the Rule (1758) by Anton Raphael Mengs.

The wooden choir stools of the church escaped the earthquake of 1706, and are now conserved in the Civic Museum. The organ, built in 1681, has artwork by Giovan Battista Del Frate and gilding Caldarella di Santo Stefano. In the choir, devoid of its polychrome marble altar are openings, one leading to an original part of the church building with ancient frescoes, the other to the Caldora chapel. The 15th-century Cappella Caldora is a masterwork in the complex, with its funeral monument sculpted in 1412 by Gualtiero d'Alemagna is frescoed by Giovanni di Sulmona with episodes of the Life of Christ.
