= Enrico Santangelo =

Italian author and art historian

Enrico Santangelo (Pescara, 1963) is an Italian author and art historian.

Born in Pescara, where he currently lives and works, Enrico Santangelo is an architect and painter. He wrote several publications about heritage in Abruzzo.

On his debut as a novelist, in 2000 he won the literary competition for young authors "Pescarabruzzo" with the book "Il paese di Aiace" (The town of Ajax).

== Bibliography ==
- Santangelo, Enrico (2000). Il paese di Aiace e altri racconti (in Italian). Pescara: Tracce.
- Santangelo, Enrico (2001). Loreto Aprutino: guida storico-artistica alla citta e dintorni (in Italian). Pescara: Carsa Edizioni. ISBN 978-88-501-0018-7.
- Santangelo, Enrico (2002). Manoppello: guida storico-artistica alla città e dintorni (in Italian). Pescara: Carsa Edizioni. ISBN 978-88-501-0028-6.
- Santangelo, Enrico (2002). Castelli e tesori d'arte della Media Valle dell'Aterno: Fossa, Ocre, San Demetrio ne' Vestini, Sant'Eusanio Forconese, Villa Sant'Angelo (in Italian). Pescara: Carsa Edizioni. ISBN 978-88-501-0051-4.
- Santangelo, Enrico (2002). Tortoreto: guida storico-artistica alla città e dintorni (in Italian). Pescara: Carsa Edizioni. ISBN 978-88-501-0009-5.
- Santangelo, Enrico (2002). Una storia a teatro: il comunale di Loreto Aprutino: documentazione sul teatro Luigi De Deo dalla sua fondazione ai giorni nostri (in Italian). Pescara: Carsa Edizioni. ISBN 978-88-501-0059-0.
- Santangelo, Enrico (2006). Roccamorice e gli eremi celestiniani: guida storico-artistica (in Italian). Pescara: Carsa Edizioni. ISBN 978-88-501-0105-4.
- Santangelo, Enrico (2007). Pettorano sul Gizio: guida storico-artistica alla città e dintorni (in Italian). Pescara: Carsa Edizioni. ISBN 978-88-501-0107-8.
- Marialuce Latini; Edoardo Micati; Enrico Santangelo (2008). Borghi e paesi d'Abruzzo (in Italian). Pescara: Carsa Edizioni.
- Ezio Burri; Ugo Esposito; Lia Giancristofaro; Marialuce Latini; Aurelio Manzi; Giuseppe Manzi; Enrico Santangelo (2008). La Provincia di Chieti: luoghi, patrimoni e paesaggi (in Italian). Pescara: Carsa Edizioni. ISBN 978-88-501-0159-7.
- Santangelo, Enrico (2010). Ortona: guida storico-artistica (in Italian). Pescara: Carsa Edizioni. ISBN 978-88-501-0089-7.
- Santangelo, Enrico (2011). Il duomo di Atri e il museo capitolare (in Italian). Pescara: Carsa Edizioni. ISBN 978-88-501-0255-6.
- Santangelo, Enrico (2011). Atri: guida storico-artistica alla città e dintorni (in Italian). Pescara: Carsa Edizioni. ISBN 978-88-501-0254-9.
- Berardo Pio; Enrico Santangelo; Marcello Sgattoni; Paola Di Felice; Giampiero Marcocci; Luca Falconi Di Francesco (2014). Il duomo di Teramo (in Italian). Teramo: Ricerche&Redazioni. ISBN 978-88-88925-68-4.
