= Hermitage of Sant'Onofrio al Morrone =

Hermitage in Sulmona, L'Aquila, Italy

Coordinates: 42.0847°N 13.9356°E

- Eremo di Sant'Onofrio al Morrone
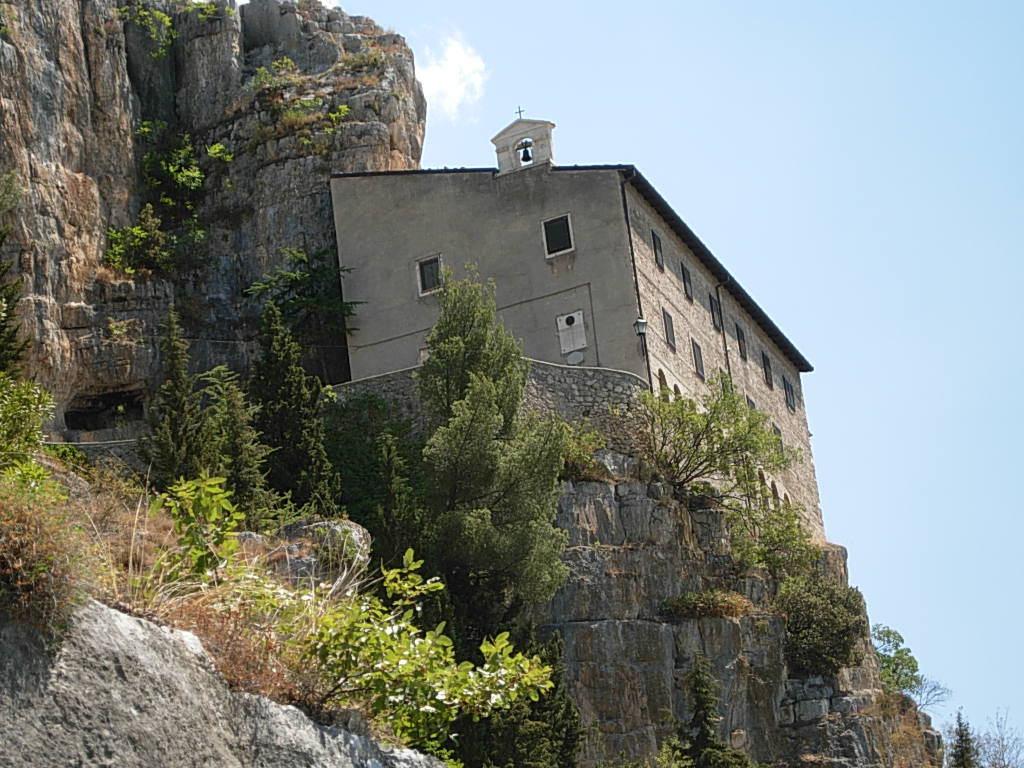
- View of the hermitage

- Location within Abruzzo

Religion
- Affiliation: Roman Catholic
- Province: Province of L'Aquila
- Region: Abruzzo

Location
- Municipality: Sulmona
- State: Italy
- Interactive map of Hermitage of Sant'Onofrio al Morrone

Architecture
- Completed: 11th-century

Eremo di Sant'Onofrio al Morrone (Italian for Hermitage of Sant'Onofrio al Morrone) is an hermitage located in Sulmona, Province of L'Aquila (Abruzzo, Italy), dating back to the thirteenth century. A monk by the name of Pietro Angelerio, living at this hermitage, later became Pope Celestine V. The hermitage is located at an altitude of 620 meters, and can only be reached via a steep path from the village of Badia, on the eastern edge of the Valle Peligna.

== History ==
Pietro Angelerio arrived in Abruzzo between 1239 and 1241, and settled in a cave on the slopes of Mount Morrone. He would later have a small church built there called "Santa Maria in Ruta" or "in Gruttis."

Soon Pietro, who actively proselytized the faith first in the area and later also abroad, realized that the hermitage had become inadequate for ascetic meditation and moved to the Majella where he founded the hermitage of Santo Spirito d'Ocre. However, he often returned to the Morrone and arranged the construction of a real hermitage, on a steep and difficult-to-access place overlooking the Sulmona basin. The location lent itself to the solitary and ascetic life, but also to the reception of pilgrims who were drawn to the mountain retreat by Pietro's renown.

In 1294, immediately after the conclave which elected Pietro Angelerio as pope, the king of Naples, Charles II of Anjou, arrived on Morrone to tell Pietro of his election and accompanied him to L'Aquila for a solemn coronation in the basilica of Santa Maria di Collemaggio. Celestino V would remain on the papal throne for only four months, returning to hermitage in 1295 after having renounced the papacy. The new Pope Boniface VIII, in order to prevent his predecessor's potential installation as antipope, imprisoned him in the castle of Fumone, where he died on 19 May 1296.

== Architecture ==
In front of the church is a portico leading to the small court facing the churchyard. Inside the church are remains of 15th century frescoes depicting Christ the King and St. John the Baptist, and some later paintings representing a Madonna and Child with Santa Lucia and Santa Apollonia.

The wooden ceiling is a notable example of fifteenth-century workmanship. A barrel vault extends over the church, with two modern altars dedicated to Sant'Onofrio and Sant'Antonio Abate. In the rear is an arch that leads to the chapel of the oratory. A fifteenth-century triptych on wood that depicted Sant'Onofrio, San Pietro Celestino and the Blessed Roberto da Salle (a disciple of Pietro Angelerio) was removed in 1884.
