= Montagne del Morrone =

Mountain in Abruzzo, Italy

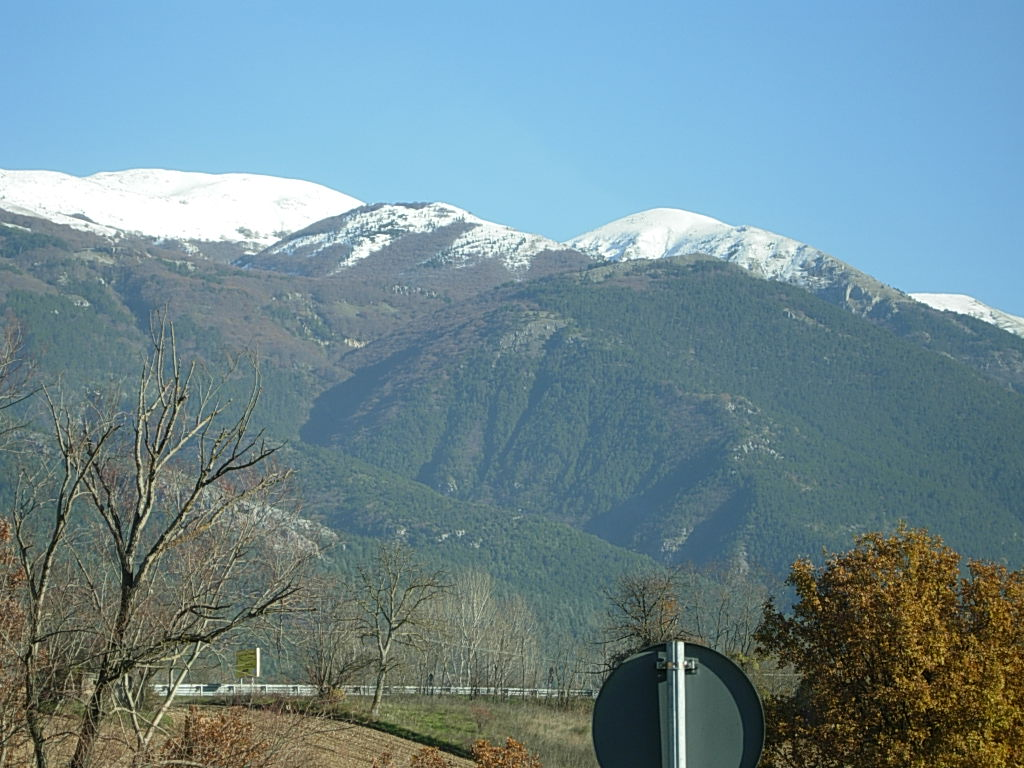
- View of Monte Morrone

Highest point
- Elevation: 2,061 m (6,762 ft)
- Coordinates: 42°07′N 14°00′E

Geography
- Location: Province of L'Aquila, province of Pescara, Italy
- Parent range: Central Apennines

The Montagne del Morrone are a mountain group in Abruzzo, central Italy, part of the Apennines. Overlooking the town of Sulmona, they are bounded by the Valle Peligna, the river Aterno and the Majella massif. They are included into the Majella National Park.

The range is composed of limestone, and have their highest peak in the Monte Morrone (2,061 m).

Vegetation include typical Apennine woods of beech and mountain pine, as well as the rare orchid species Nigritella widderi. Wildlife include Marsican brown bear, italian wolf, mouflon, red deer, golden eagle, peregrine falcon, Eurasian eagle-owl and Ursini's viper. Until the early 20th century, the bearded vulture was also present.

On a terrace of Mount Morrone are the remains of a Roman villa which allegedly belonged to the poet Ovid, which have been recently recognized as a sanctuary of Hercules Curinus. Here was found a small statue of Hercules resting, considered by some an original by Lysippos (now in the Archaeological Museum of Chieti). Nearby is the 13th century Morronese Abbey. In the mountain are also two caves in which the future Pope Celestine V lived his hermitage from 1239 and 1241.

In 1997, the mountains were scene to the infamous Morrone killings.
