= Tourism in Abruzzo =

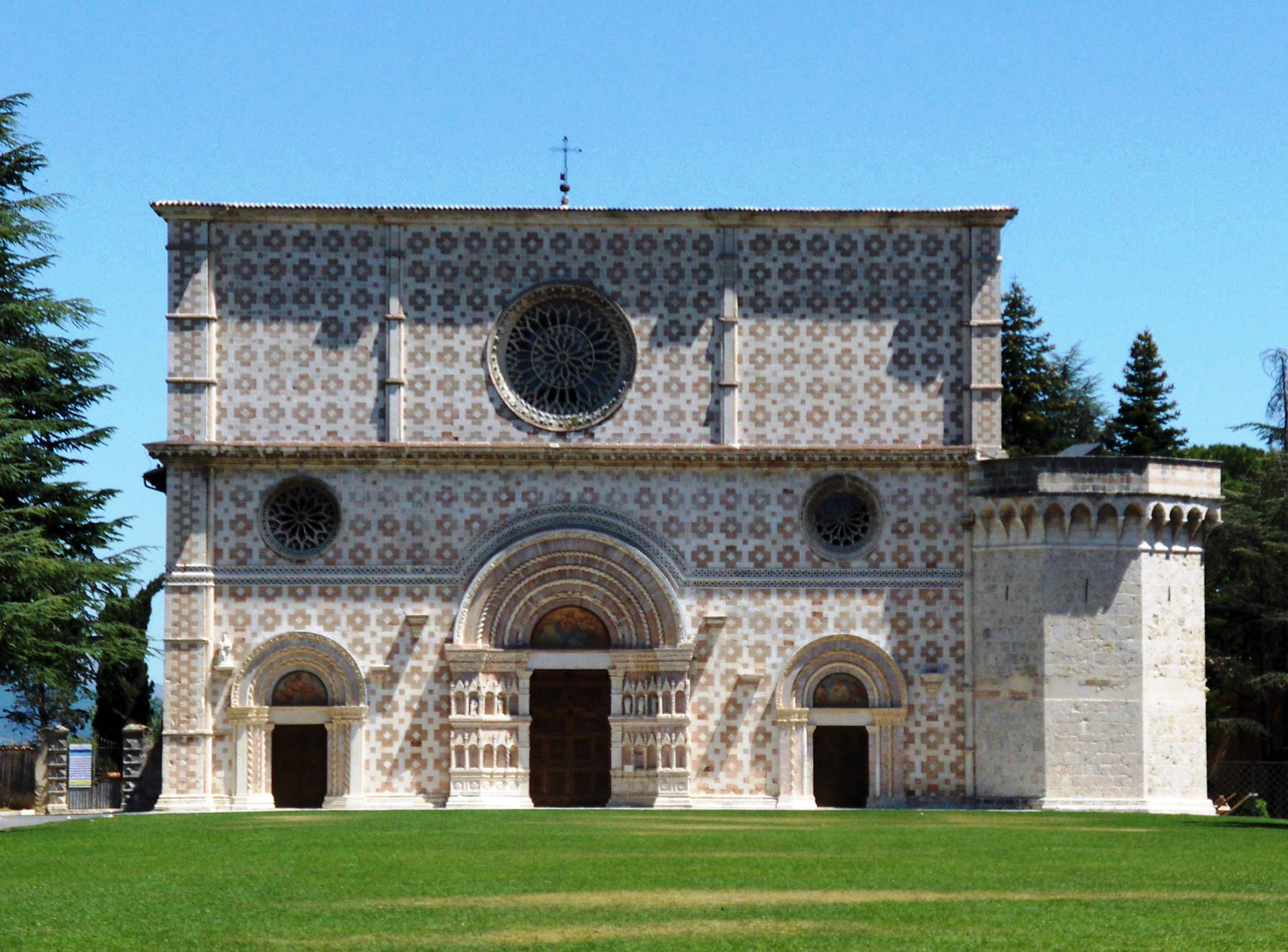
- Santa Maria di Collemaggio
- Time zone: UTC+1 (Central European Time)
- Area code: +39
- Website: Abruzzoturismo Official Page

Tourism in Abruzzo has become one of the most prosperous sectors in the economy of Abruzzo, and in recent years has seen a remarkable growth attracting numerous tourists from Italy and Europe. According to statistics, in 2021 arrivals totaled 1,330,887. A total of 5,197,765 arrivals were tourists, a figure that puts the region seventeenth among the Italian regions for numbers of tourists per year. A moderate support to tourism is also given to the Abruzzo Airport with many low cost and charter flights connecting the entire region with the rest of Europe.

Abruzzo tourism can basically be divided into three different types: mountain tourism hiking natural which includes numerous ski resorts, nature reserves and protected areas, beach tourism and coastal with the number of resort, hotel, camping and beaches, and finally the art-historical tourism religious and cultural concentrated mostly in mountain villages and historic towns such as l'Aquila, Vasto, Chieti, Teramo, Sulmona and many others.

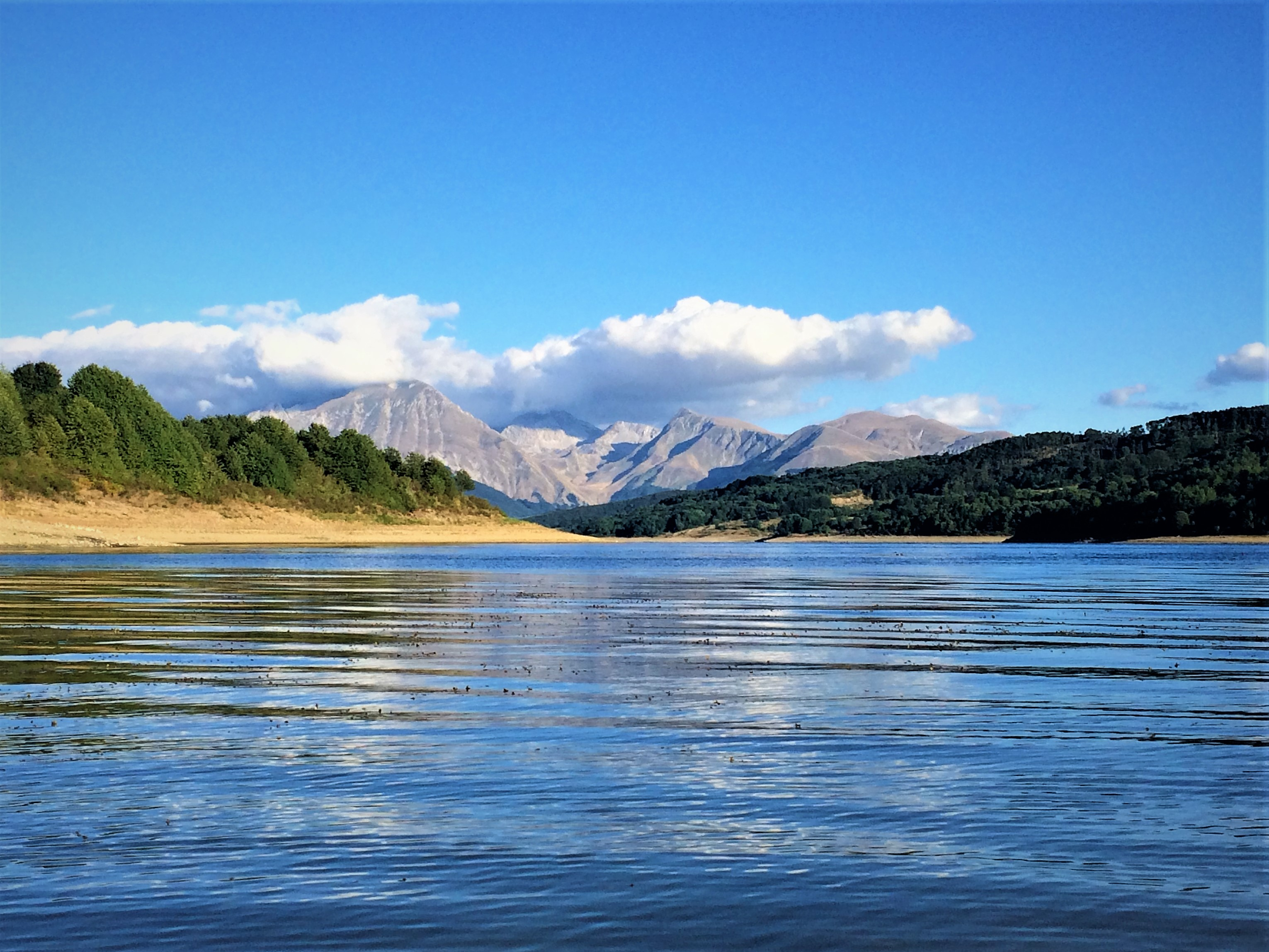
Campotosto Lake

In January 2016 the online newspaper HuffingtonPost.com has included Abruzzo in its "The World's 12 Best Place to Live or Retire in 2016", writing:

"It's hard to think of a lovelier corner of Italy than the Abruzzo. The beaches are golden, and the sea rolls out like a giant bolt of turquoise silk. There are mountains, too, meaning that, living here, you'd have both skiing and beach-combing on your doorstep, depending on the season. This region is one of Italy's secret treasures"

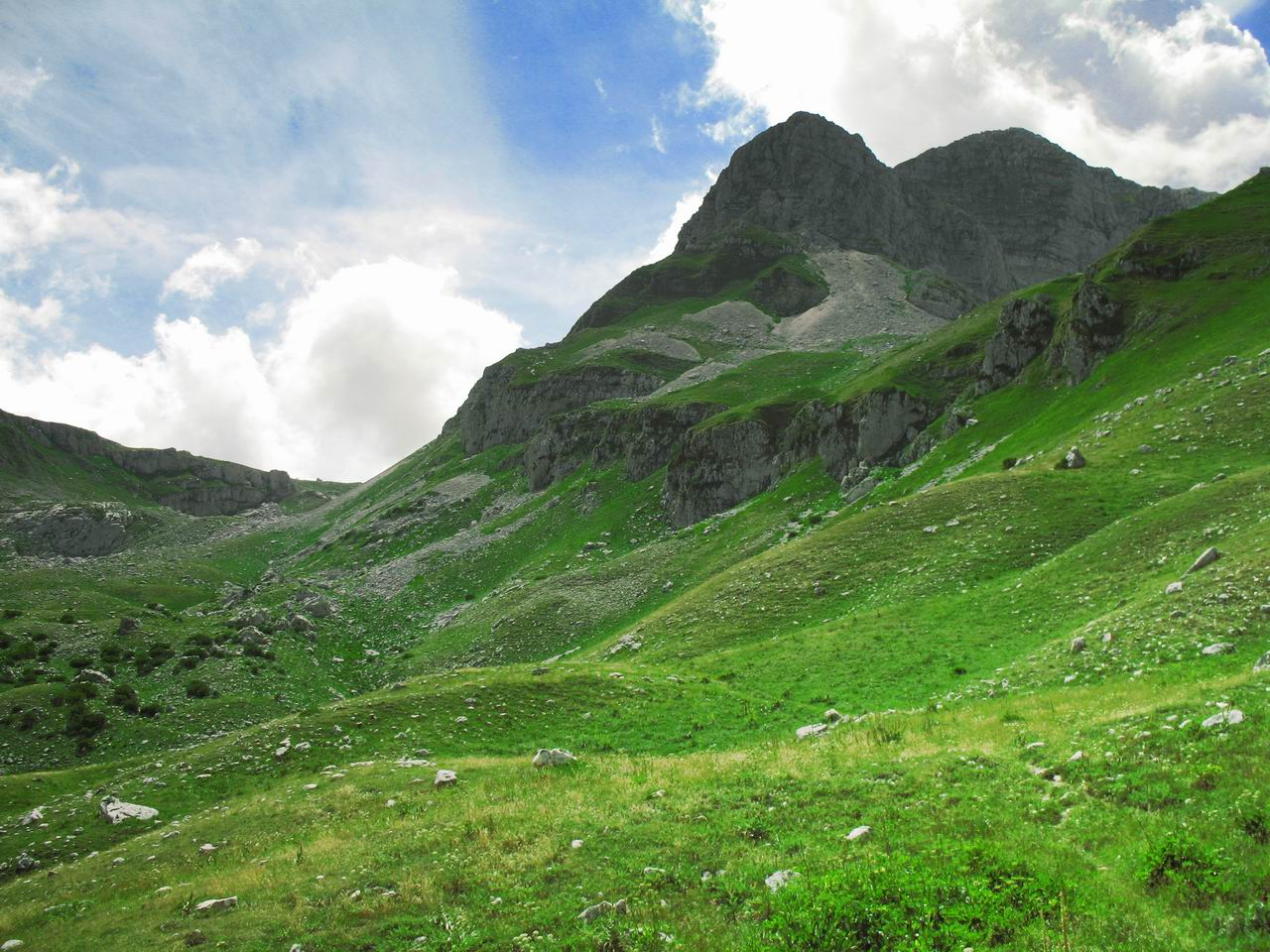
Parco Nazionale d'Abruzzo, Lazio e Molise

In 2022 also American travel magazine Travel + Leisure include Abruzzo in 50 Best Places to Travel in 2022 many other foreign magazines in the tourism sector have produced publications on the region in recent years, underlining its tourist appeal.

In 2023, arrivals were 1.745.373 tourists.

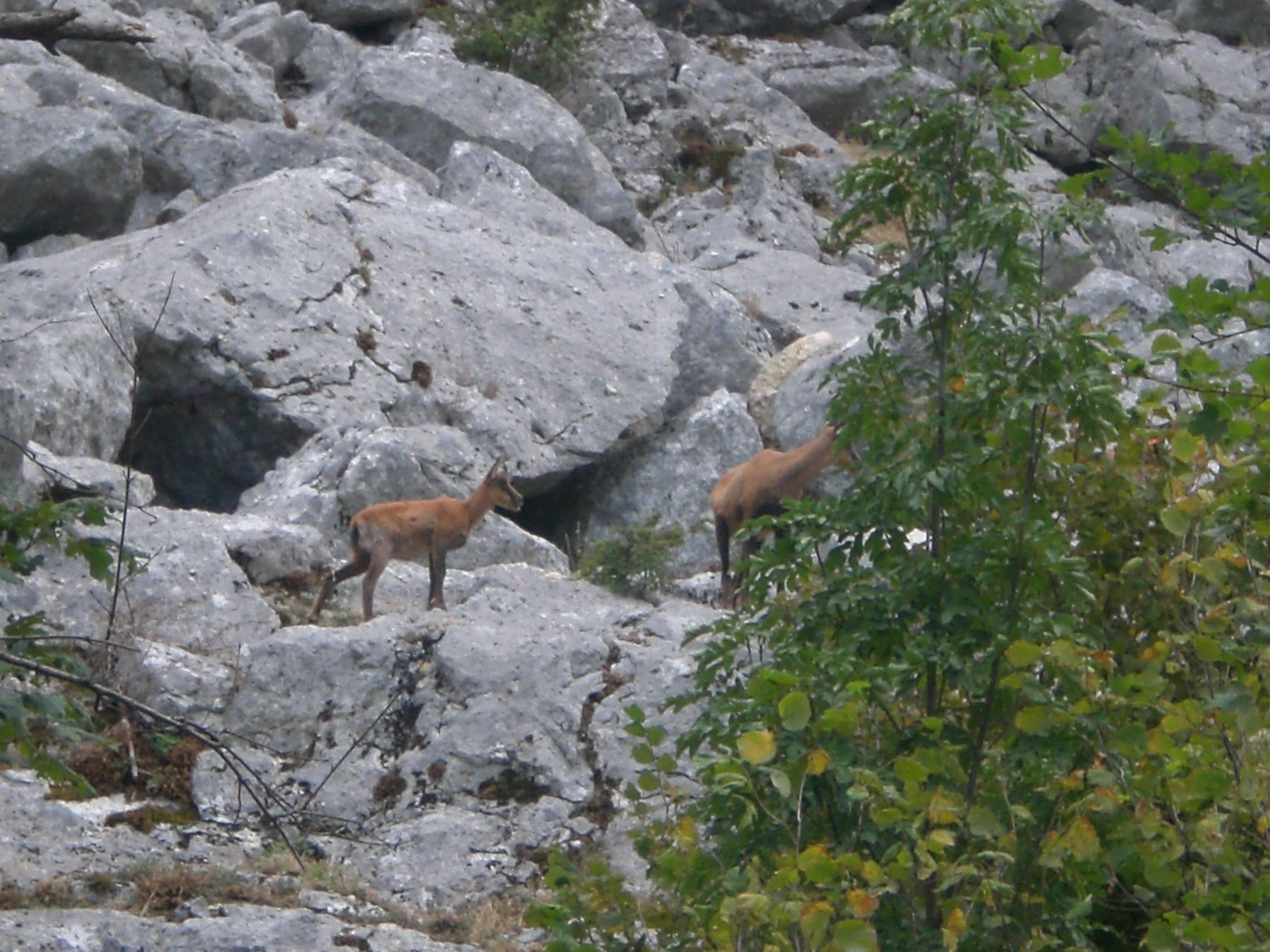
Abruzzo chamois on the National Park of Gran Sasso and Monti della Laga

== Mountain and ecotourism tourism ==
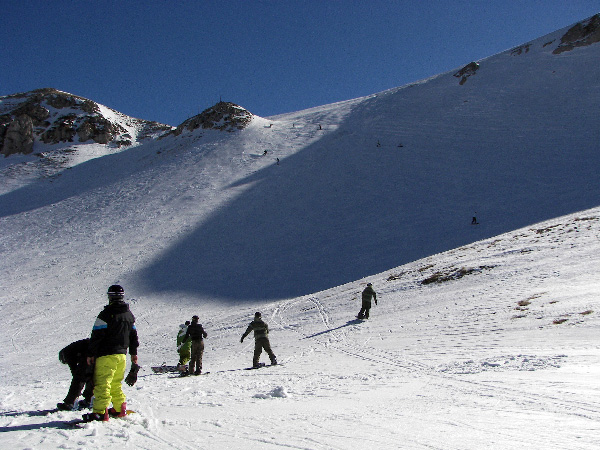
Black Track in Roccaraso ski resort (M. Aremogna)

The region currently has 23 active ski resort. They are located in the town of Scanno, Ovindoli, Pescasseroli, Roccaraso, Campo Imperatore, Campo Felice, Rivisondoli, Pescocostanzo and Pianoro Campitelli where winter tourism is highly developed and then you can play sports such as alpine skiing, snowboarding, ski mountaineering, ski touring, cross-country skiing and dog sledding. Other trails and facilities are in Passolanciano-Majelletta, Campo Rotondo, Campo di Giove, Piani di pezza, Voltigno, Centomonti, Macchiarvana, Monte Piselli.

Abruzzo is called Europe's greenest region and boasts the presence of three national parks (Parco Nazionale d'Abruzzo, Lazio e Molise, Gran Sasso e Monti della Laga National Park, Maiella National Park, and regional park Sirente Velino Regional Park) and 38 protected areas between oasis, regional reserves and state reserves. The parks allow tourists hiking and nature activities, leisure activities and holidays such as excursions to the park, horse riding, hiking, cycling, hiking, birdwatching, and canoeing, rafting, windsurfing, boating on Lake of Bomba, Lake of Scanno and Campotosto, in addition to the natural parks of Abruzzo boasts numerous protected areas.

There is also a tourist rail service on the Sulmona-Isernia railway that crosses part of the mountainous hinterland of the Abruzzo and Molise regions called Ferrovia dei Parchi. The Abruzzo tractor passes through towns such as Cansano, Campo di Giove, Palena, Rivisondoli, Pescocostanzo, Roccaraso, Castel di Sangro.

== UNESCO site ==
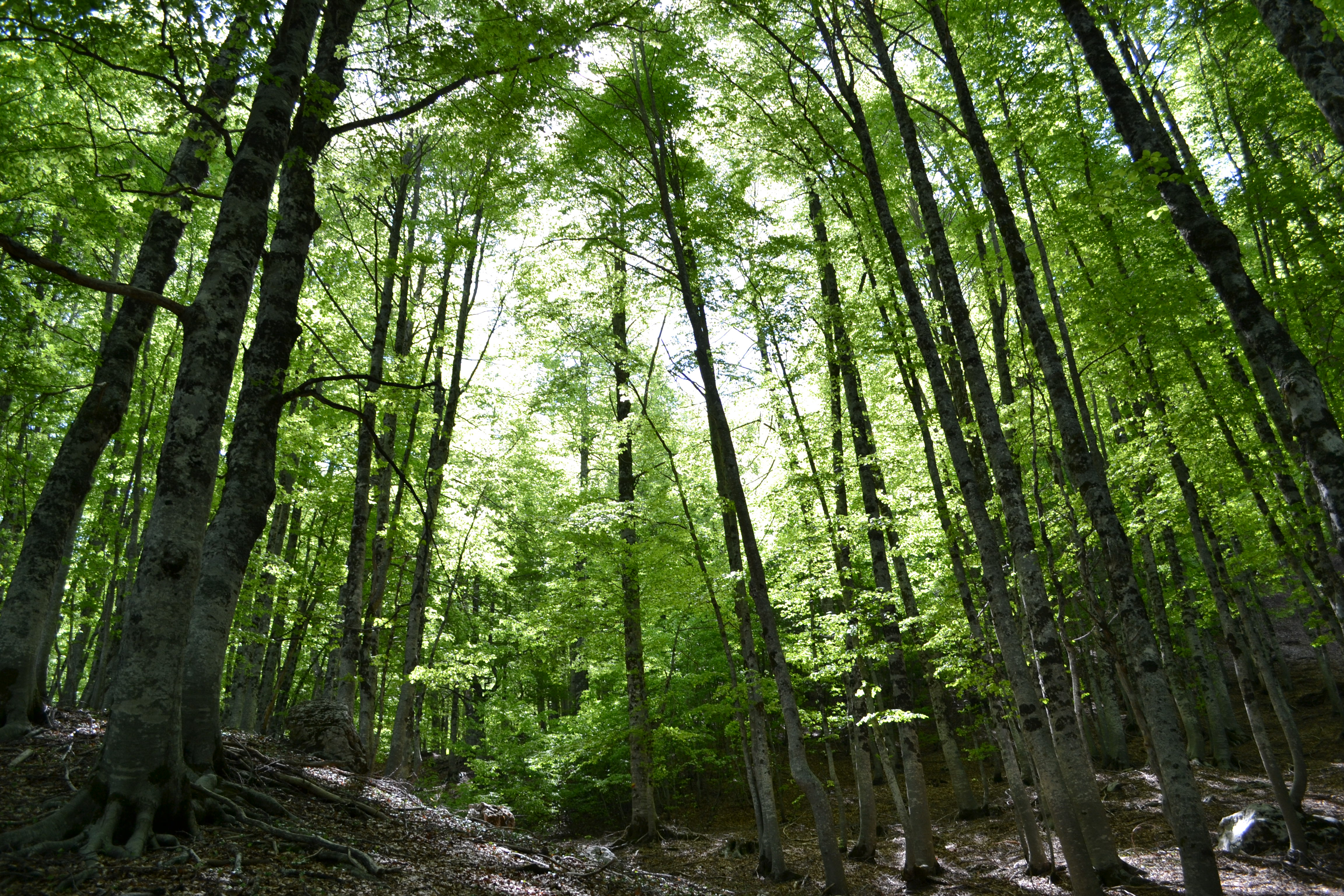
Faggeta Val Fondillo

In 2017, five clusters of ancient beech forests—covering an area of 937 hectares across the municipalities of Lecce nei Marsi (Selva Moricento), Opi (Cacciagrande and Valle Jancino in Val Fondillo), Pescasseroli (Coppo del Principe and Coppo del Morto), and Villavallelonga (Val Cervara), and dating back approximately 600 years—were recognized as a World Heritage Site, together with the primeval beech forests of the Carpathians and other regions of Europe. This is the first UNESCO recognition for the entire Abruzzo region

== Coastal and Beach tourism ==
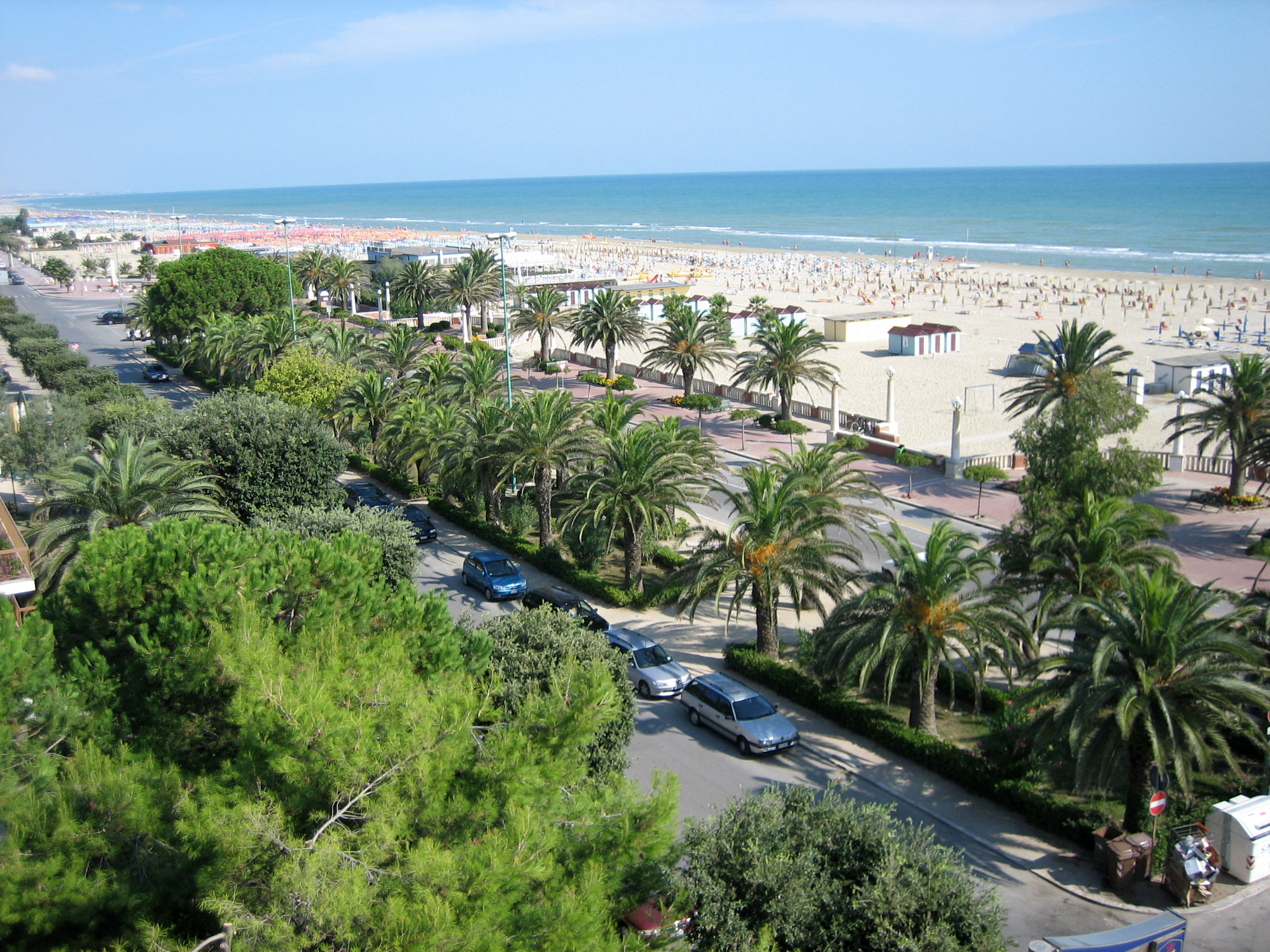
Giulianova seaside

The coast in Abruzzo extends for 129 kilometers; the north-eastern part of the Abruzzo coast and in particular the Teramo stretch is called Costa Giardino and passes through and includes municipalities such as equipped tourist seaside resorts such Pineto, Roseto degli Abruzzi, Giulianova, Alba Adriatica, Tortoreto, Martinsicuro, Silvi Marina,. The south-eastern part includes many centers of the Trabocchi Coast such as Ortona, San Vito Chietino, Fossacesia, Torino di Sangro, Casalbordino, Vasto and San Salvo, known not only for the sea but also for the ancient Abruzzo fishing machines still visible and visitable by tourists along the coast — is not only famous for the sea but also for the ancient fishing machines Abruzzo still visible and can be visited by tourists along the coast, many of these centers, tourist resorts have the privilege and prestige of being appointed Blue Flag beach for water quality and services. With regard to this type of tourism are many activities that you can do: sailing, windsurfing and kite surfing, canoeing, fishing, boating (including jet skiing and water skiing), fishing and underwater photography, scuba diving, snorkeling, horseback riding, golf, mountain biking, cycling, motorcycle racing, motocross and off-road, kayaking.

== Art-historical and religious tourism ==
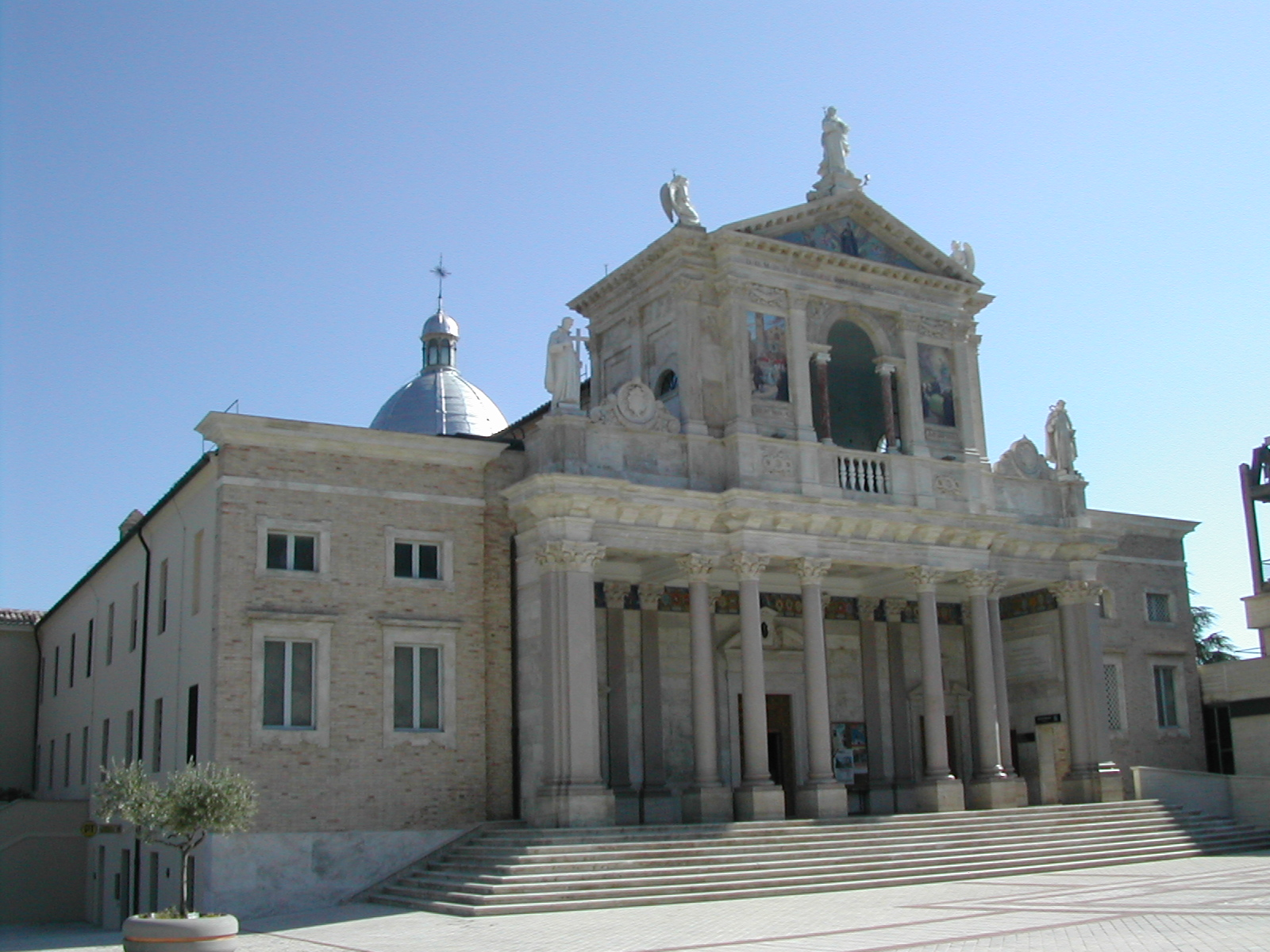
St. Gabriel's shrine: The old church

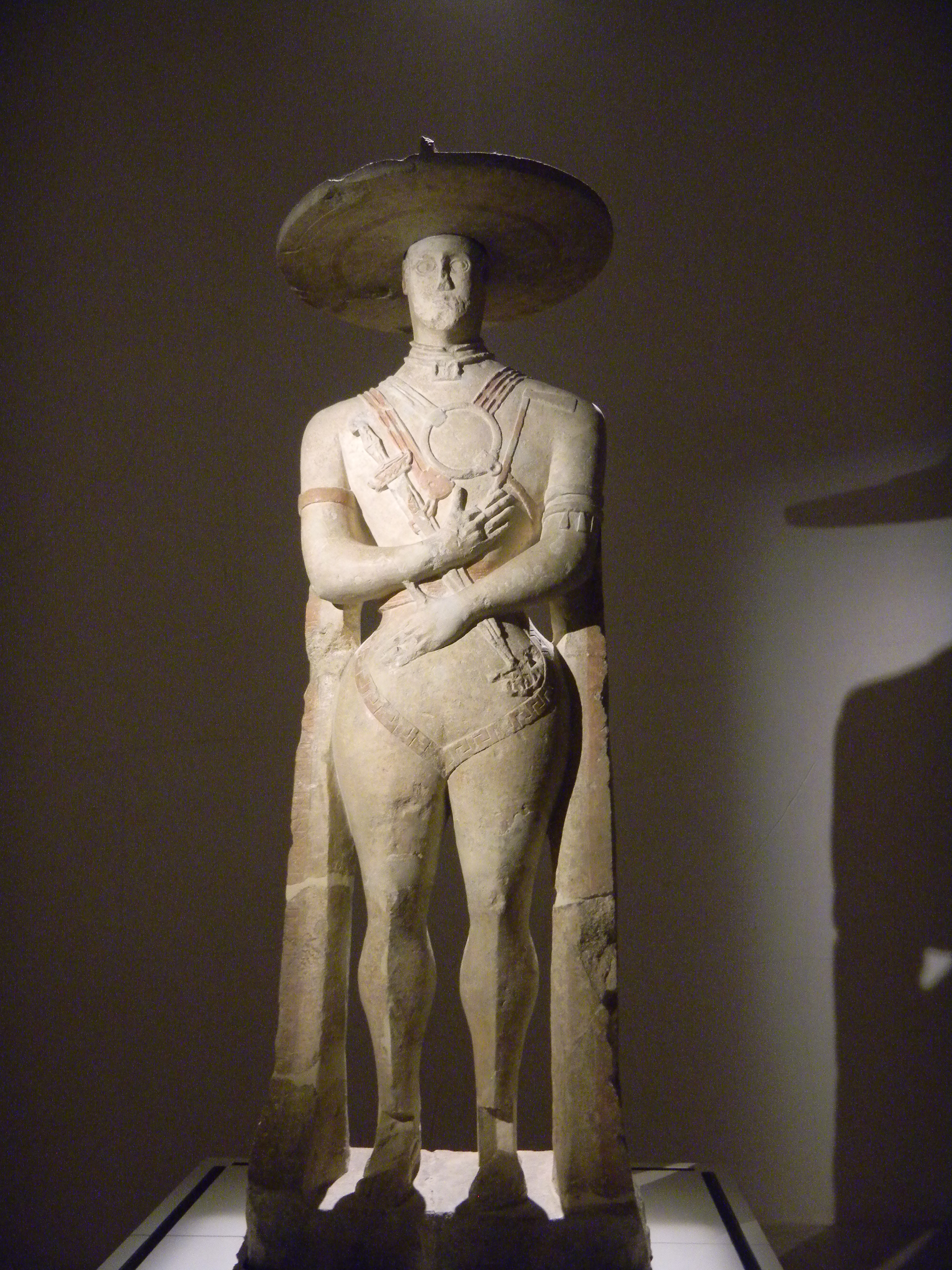
The Warrior of Capestrano

As for the art-historical and religious tourism cultural, historical and cultural importance are the city of Chieti with Roman ruins, churches, museums (Museo archeologico nazionale d'Abruzzo with inside the Warrior of Capestrano, Teramo (Teramo Cathedral), Vasto (Palazzo D'Avalos, Castello Caldonesco), Lanciano (Miracle of Lanciano), Manoppello (Manoppello Image), Ortona (Basilica-Cathedral of St. Thomas the Apostle with the remains of the saint disciple of Jesus), Atri (Basilica di Santa Maria Assunta), Giulianova (Cathedral of San Flaviano), Sulmona (Sulmona Cathedral), l'Aquila (including the famous Basilica of Santa Maria di Collemaggio - with the remains of Pope Celestine V - severely damaged by the earthquake of 2009), (Museo Nazionale d'Abruzzo), Santa Maria del Suffragio, Forte Spagnolo, Fontana delle 99 cannelle), St. Gabriel's shrine with average of 2 million visitors per year is one of the 15 most visited sanctuaries in the world and others small villages with many monuments, museums, castles and churches of national importance; even though a city Pescara modern, has basilicas, shrines, churches and important museums (Basilica della Madonna dei sette dolori, Madonna del Fuoco, Pescara Cathedral, e Museo casa natale Gabriele D'Annunzio).

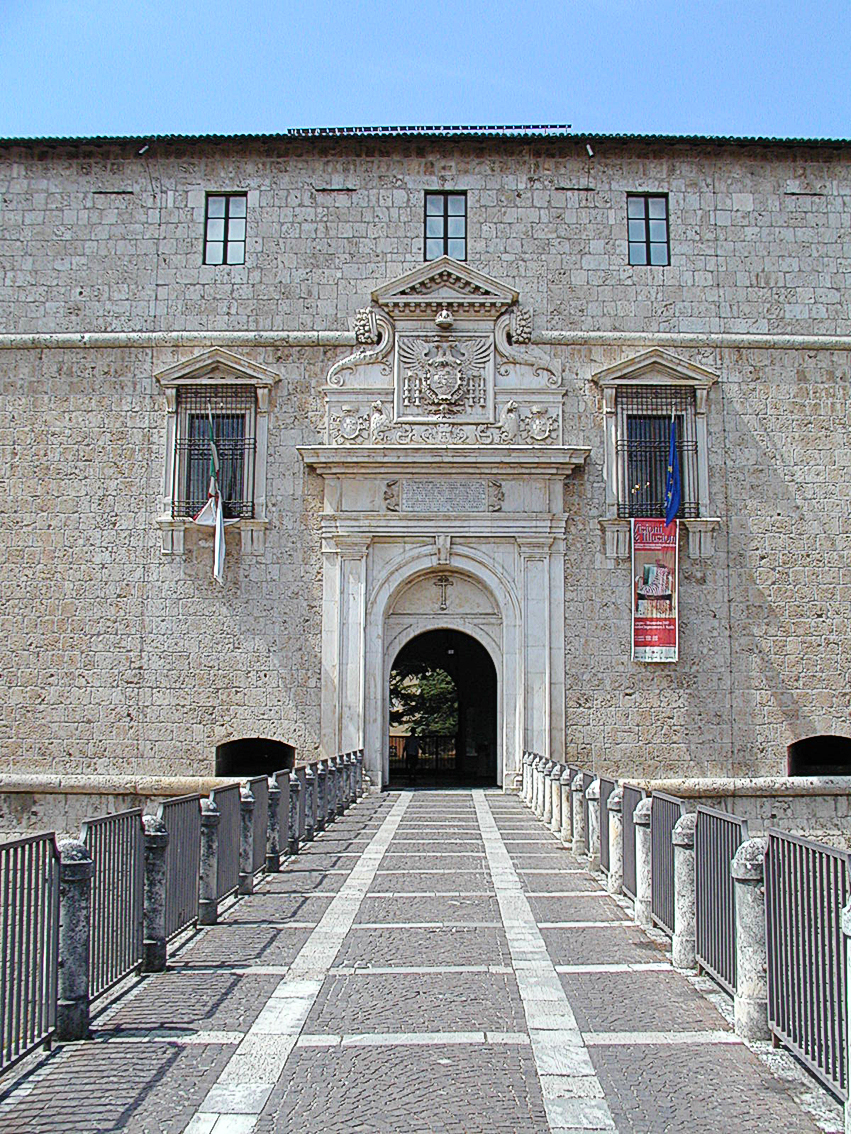
Museo Nazionale d'Abruzzo

In the interior mountains are ancient villages included, among other things on the list of I Borghi più belli d'Italia(Abbateggio, Anversa degli Abruzzi, Bugnara, Campli, Caramanico Terme, Casoli, Castel del Monte, Castelli, Città Sant'Angelo, Civitella del Tronto whose fortress is the most visited monument in the whole Abruzzo region, Crecchio, Guardiagrele, Introdacqua, Navelli, Opi, Pacentro, Penne, Pescocostanzo, Pettorano sul Gizio, Pietracamela, Pretoro, Rocca San Giovanni, Santo Stefano di Sessanio, Scanno, Tagliacozzo, Villalago), castles (in Roccascalegna, Celano, Pacentro, Anversa degli Abruzzi, Avezzano, Balsorano, Villalago, Calascio, Valle Castellana, Monteodorisio, Carpineto Sinello, Crecchio, Civitaluparella, Ortona, Castiglione Messer Marino, Civitella Messer Raimondo, Vasto, Palmoli, Serramonacesca, Salle), hermitages (Sant'Onofrio al Morrone, San Giovanni, San Bartolomeo, etc..), sanctuaries Basilica santuario del Volto Santo di Manoppello, Monastero di Santa Maria in Valle Rotana Convents (Convento del Ritiro della Santissima Annunziata del Poggio, Convento della Madonna del Carmine, Convento di San Francesco (Lanciano), Convento Michetti, Ex Convento di San Donato), abbeys (San Clemente a Casauria, San Liberatore a Majella, San Giovanni in Venere, Abbazia Santa Maria in Montesanto, Abbazia di Santa Lucia, Abbazia di Santa Maria Arabona, Badia Morronese), and old churches (Santa Maria ad Cryptas a Fossa, San Tommaso di Caramanico and others).

Since 2011 the celebration of Celestinian Forgiveness is a "Heritage of Italy for tradition" ("Patrimonio d'Italia per la tradizione") and in 2019 it was inscribed in the UNESCO Representative List of the Intangible Cultural Heritage of Humanity.

== Food and wine tourism ==
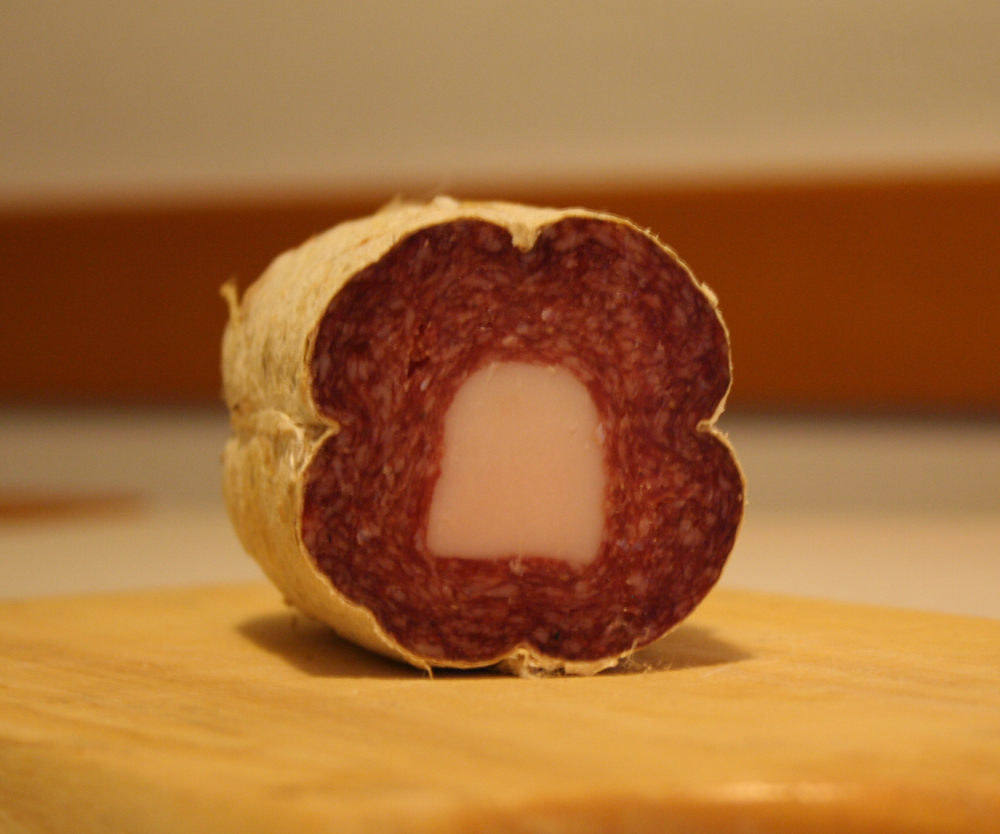
Mortadella di Campotosto

The food and wine sector has also been re-evaluated in recent years, with a varied cuisine, which preserves ancient features of the ancient pastoral and mountain and sea recipes, and today offers food and wine products of excellence, among which the Saffron of l'Aquila, the Liquorice of Atri, the Confetti di Sulmona, the Mortadella di Campotosto, the prestigious wine Montepulciano d'Abruzzo and many others.

== Places of interest ==
=== Parks and protected areas ===
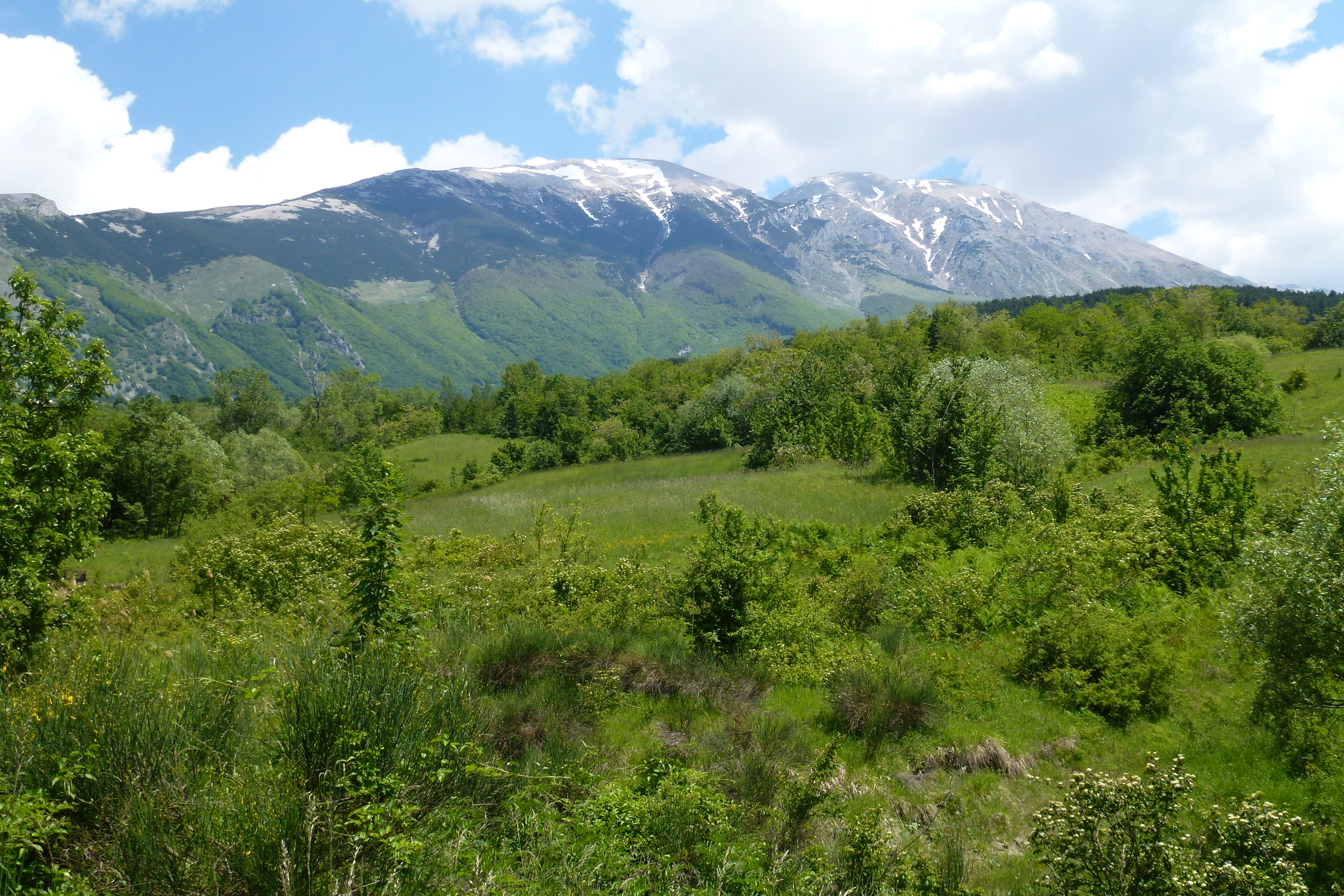
Maiella

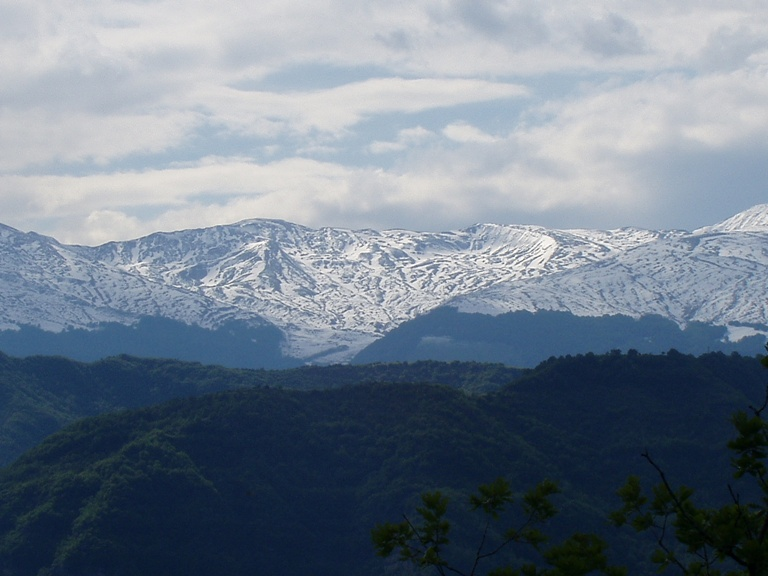
Monti della Laga

- Parco Nazionale d'Abruzzo, Lazio e Molise
- Gran Sasso e Monti della Laga National Park
- Maiella National Park
- Sirente Velino Regional Park
- Bosco di Sant'Antonio - Natural Reserve - Pescocostanzo
- Chamois Wildlife Area - Pacentro
- Abetina Selva Grande - Castiglione Messer Marino
- Torre del Cerrano Marine Protected Area
- Del Verde Waterfalls - Borrello
- Zompo Lo Schioppo Waterfalls
- Beechwood in Rosello
- Riserva Naturale Lago di Campotosto - Campotosto
- Regional Nature Reserve of Punta Aderci
- Nature Reserve Pineta Dannunziana
- Riserva Naturale di Monte Salviano
- Monti Simbruini

=== Ski resort ===
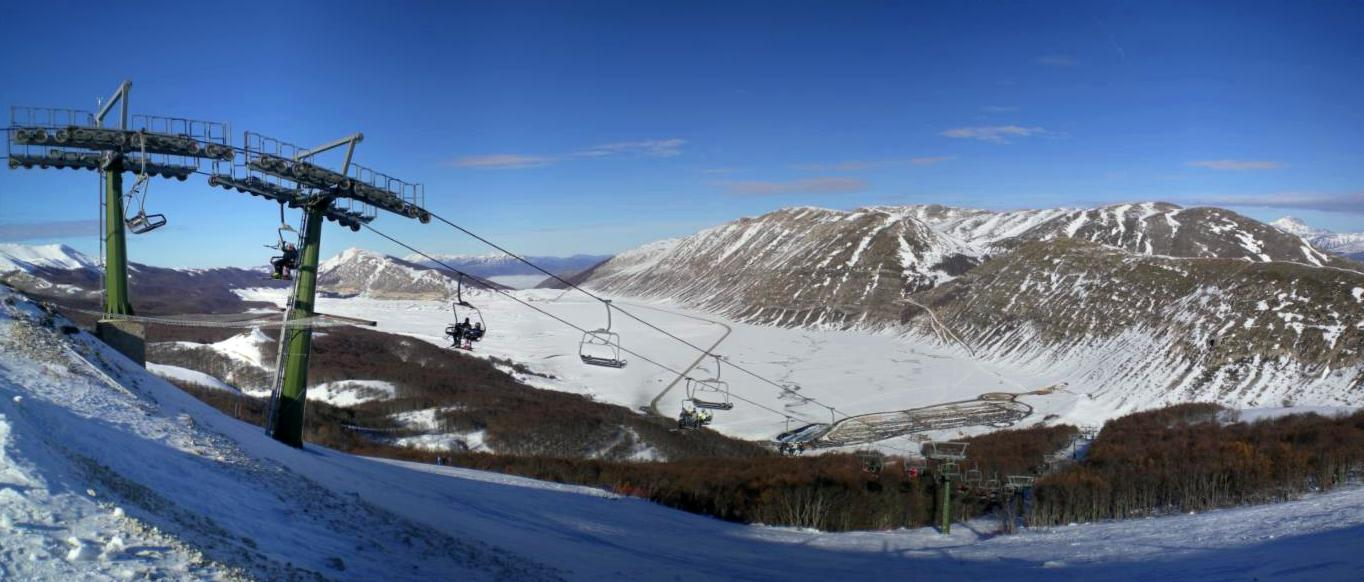
Ski resort Campo Felice

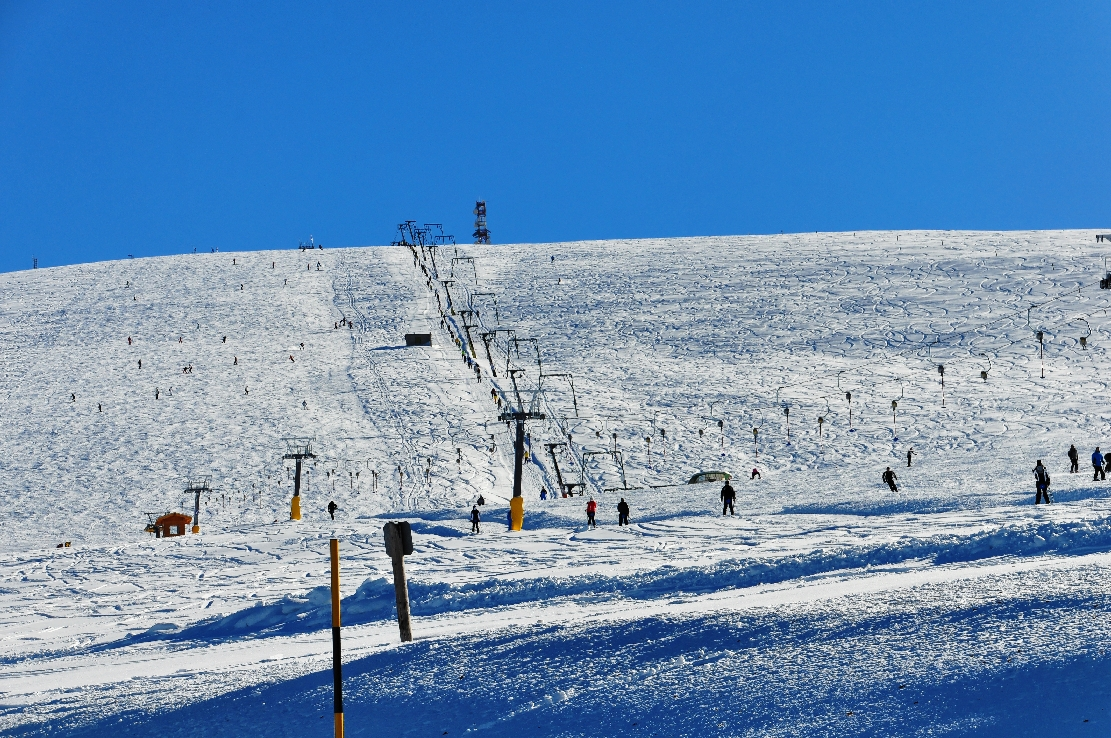
Maielletta ski resort

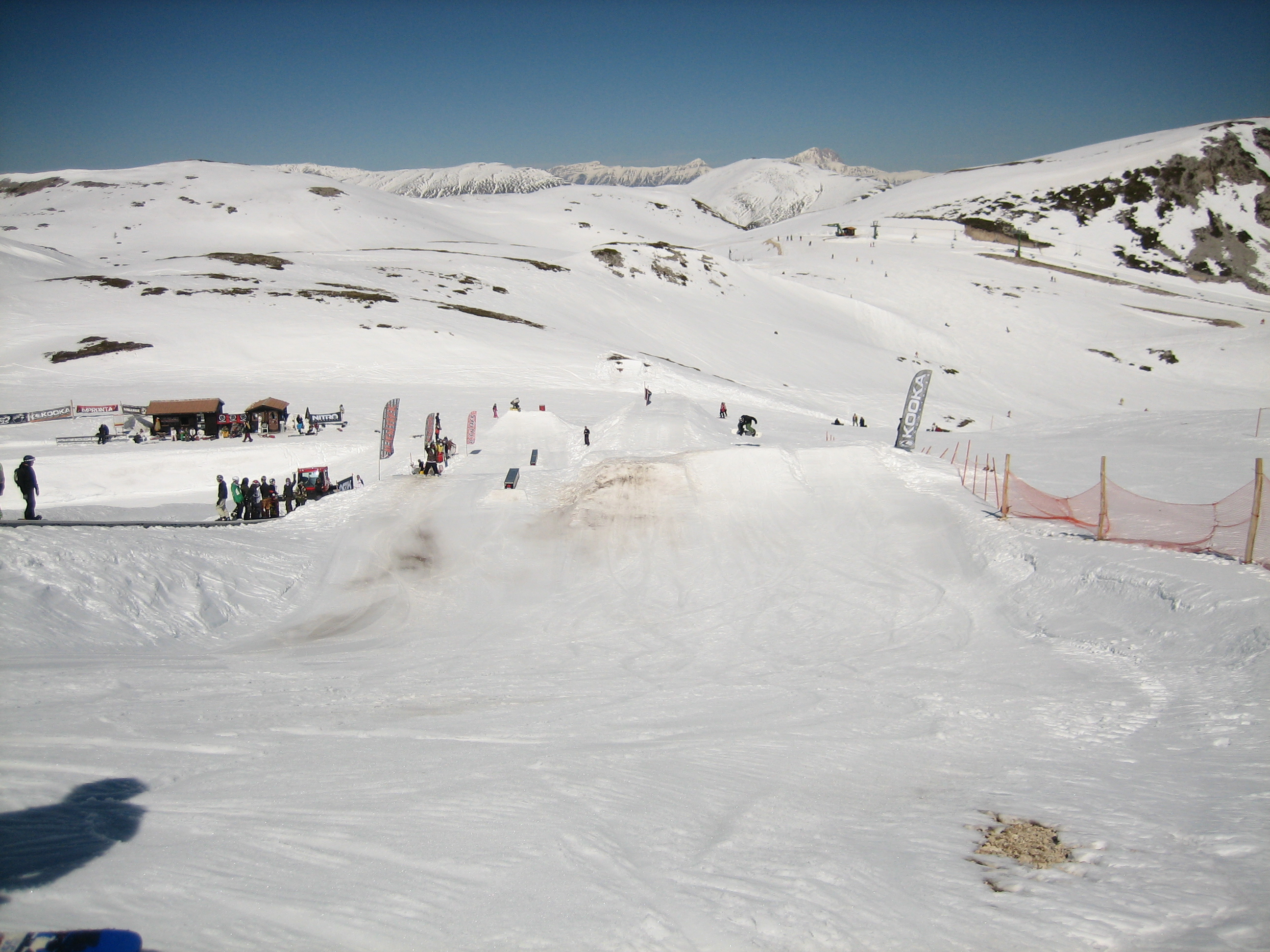
Ovindoli ski resort

- Campo di Giove
- Cappadocia
- Tre Nevi (Campo Felice, Campo Imperatore, Ovindoli)
- Alto Sangro (Barrea, Pescasseroli, Pescocostanzo, Rivisondoli, Roccaraso)
- Passo Lanciano-La Majelletta ski area (Pretoro, Rapino, Pennapiedimonte, Roccamorice)
- Prati di Tivo
- Scanno (Monte Rotondo, Passo Godi)
- Tagliacozzo
- San Giacomo (Valle Castellana)
- Prato Selva
- Campo Rotondo
- Passo San Leonardo
- Passo Godi
- Pizzoferrato
- Gamberale

=== Beaches ===
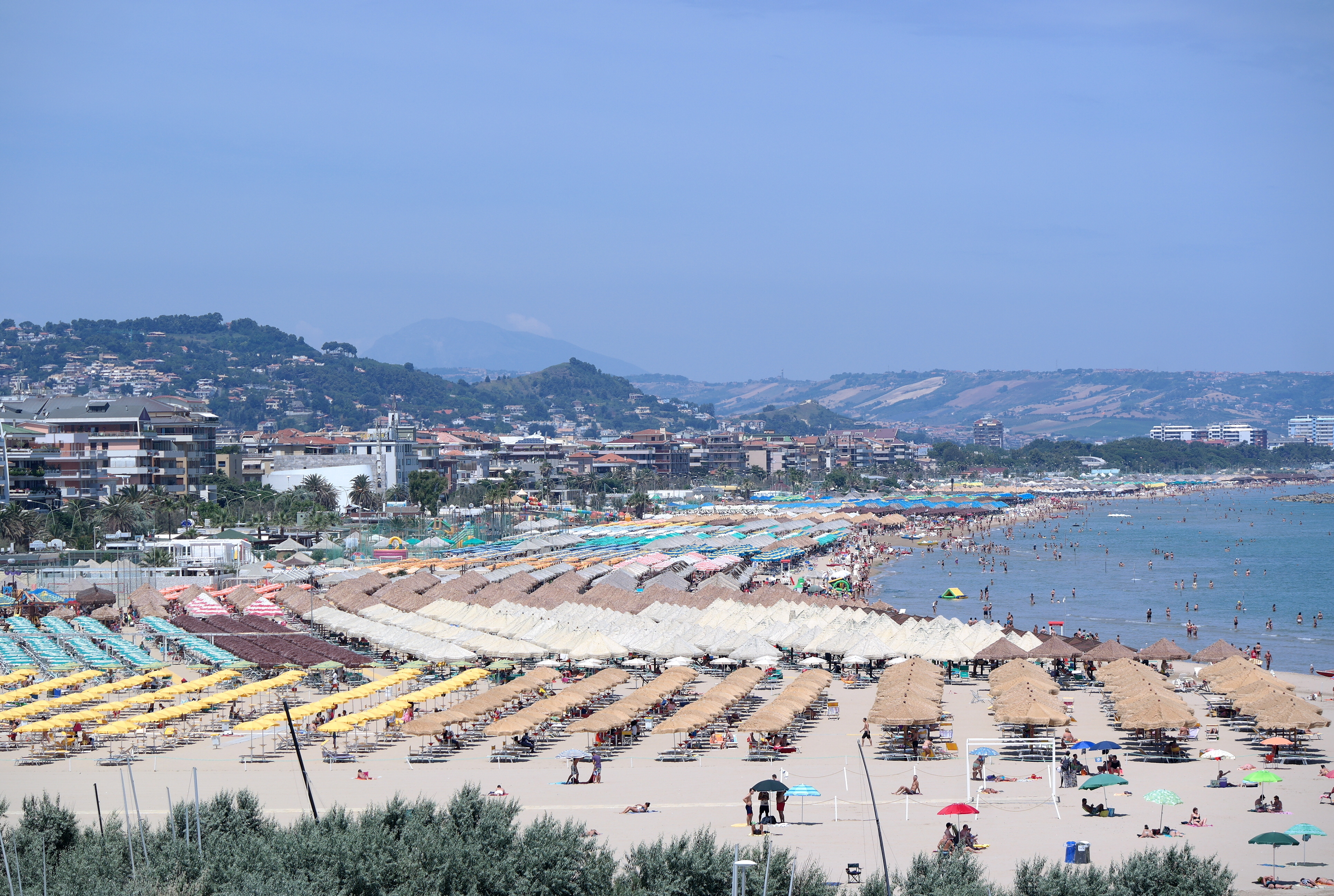
Pescara beach

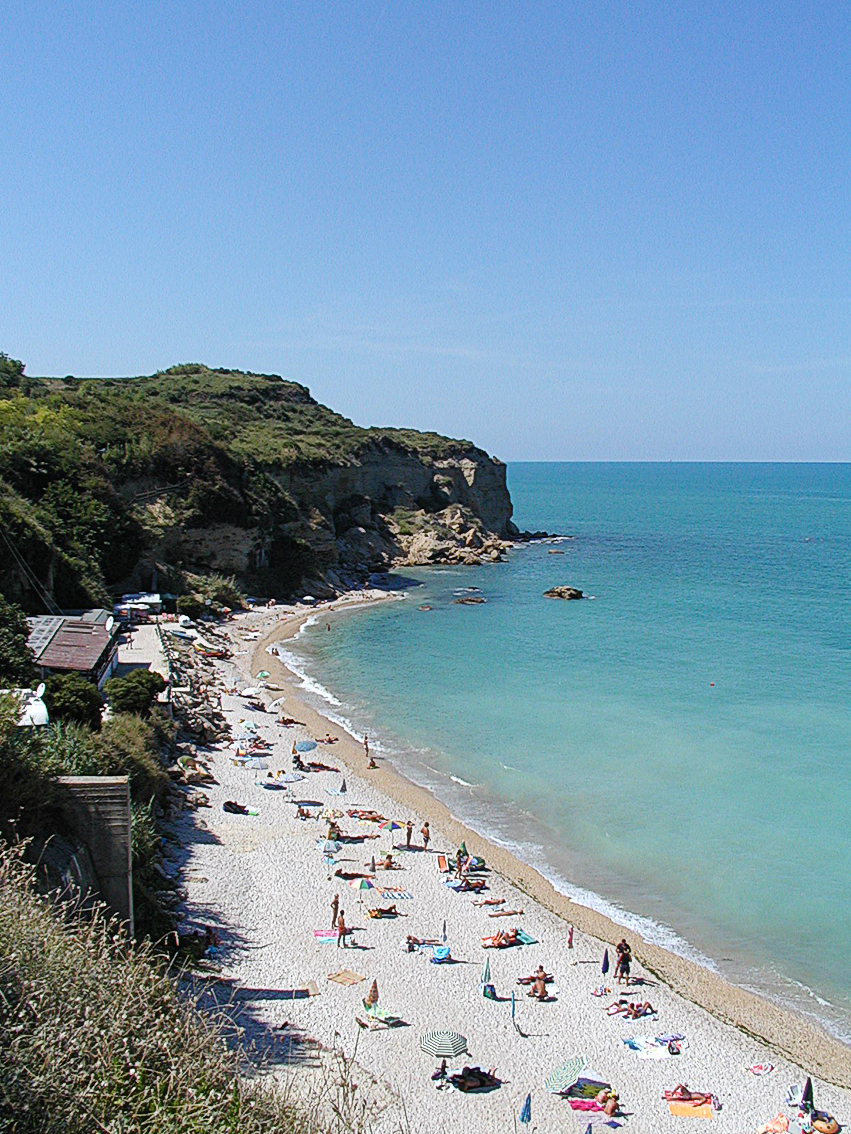
Ortona

- Lidi di Martinsicuro
- Lidi di Alba Adriatica
- Lidi di Tortoreto
- Lidi di Giulianova
- Lidi di Pineto
- Lido e riserva naturale di Torre di Cerrano
- Cologna Spiaggia
- Lidi di Silvi
- Lido di Città Sant'Angelo
- Lido di Montesilvano
- Lidi di Pescara
- Lido di Francavilla al Mare
- Trabocchi Coast
- Ortona - Lido Riccio, Lido Saraceni e Ripari di Giobbe
- Lido "La Foce" di Rocca San Giovanni
- San Vito Chietino - Punta Cavalluccio
- Lido "Pesca Palombo" di Fossacesia
- Torino di Sangro - Le Morge
- Lidi di Casalbordino
- Vasto - Punta Aderci, Punta Penna e Marina di Vasto
- San Salvo Marina

=== Lakes ===
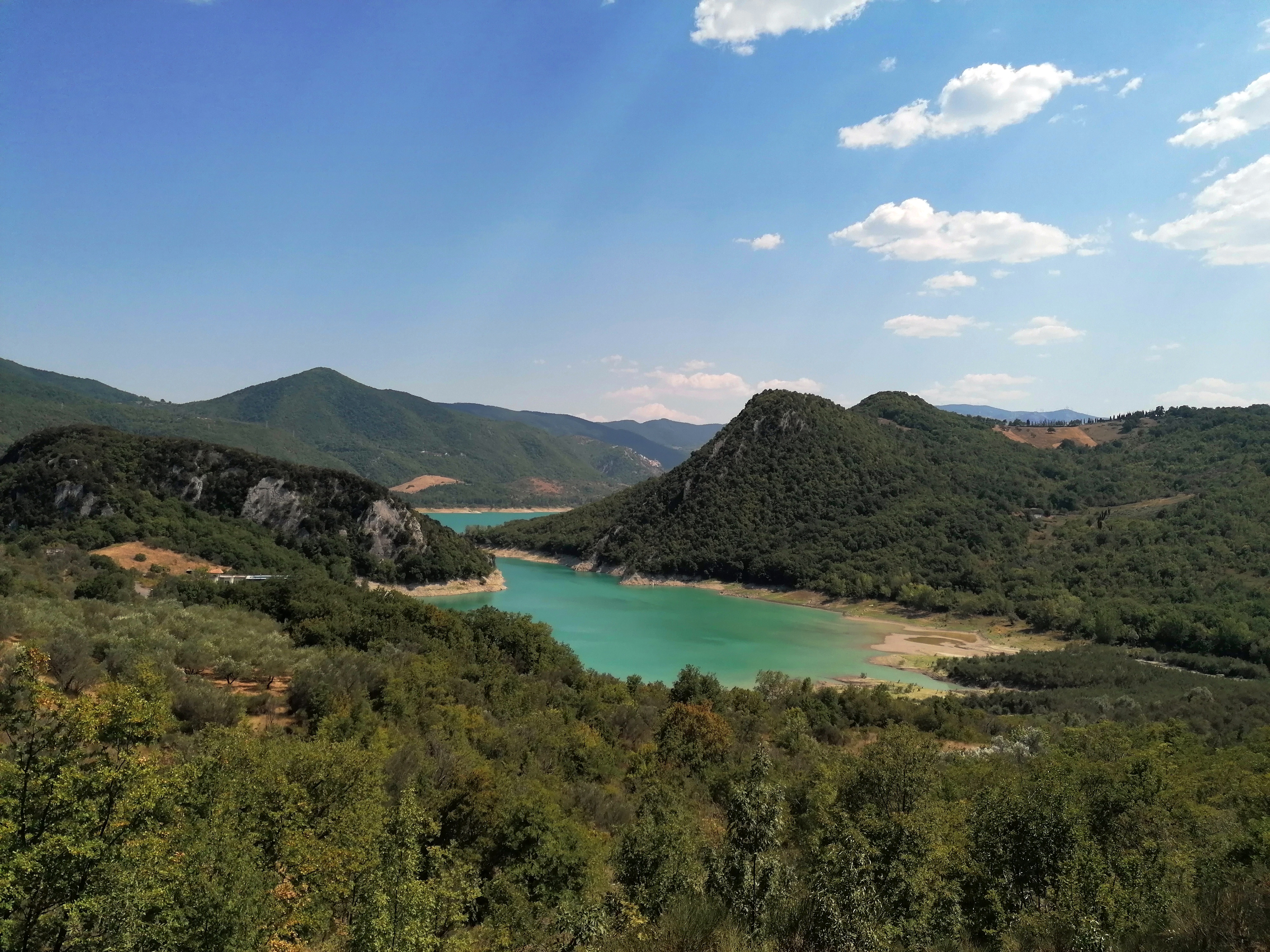
Bomba Lake

- Lake Campotosto
- Lake Barrea
- Lago di Bomba
- Fucine Lake
- Pio Lake
- Lago di San Domenico
- Lago di Scanno
- Lago di Pantaniello - Barrea
- Lago di Penne
- Lago di S. Angelo o di Casoli - Casoli
- Lago di Secinaro - Secinaro
- Lago di Serranella
- Lago di Sinizzo - San Demetrio Ne' Vestini
- Lago Montagna Spaccata - Alfedena
- Lake Pietranzoni in Campo Imperatore

=== Historic cities ===
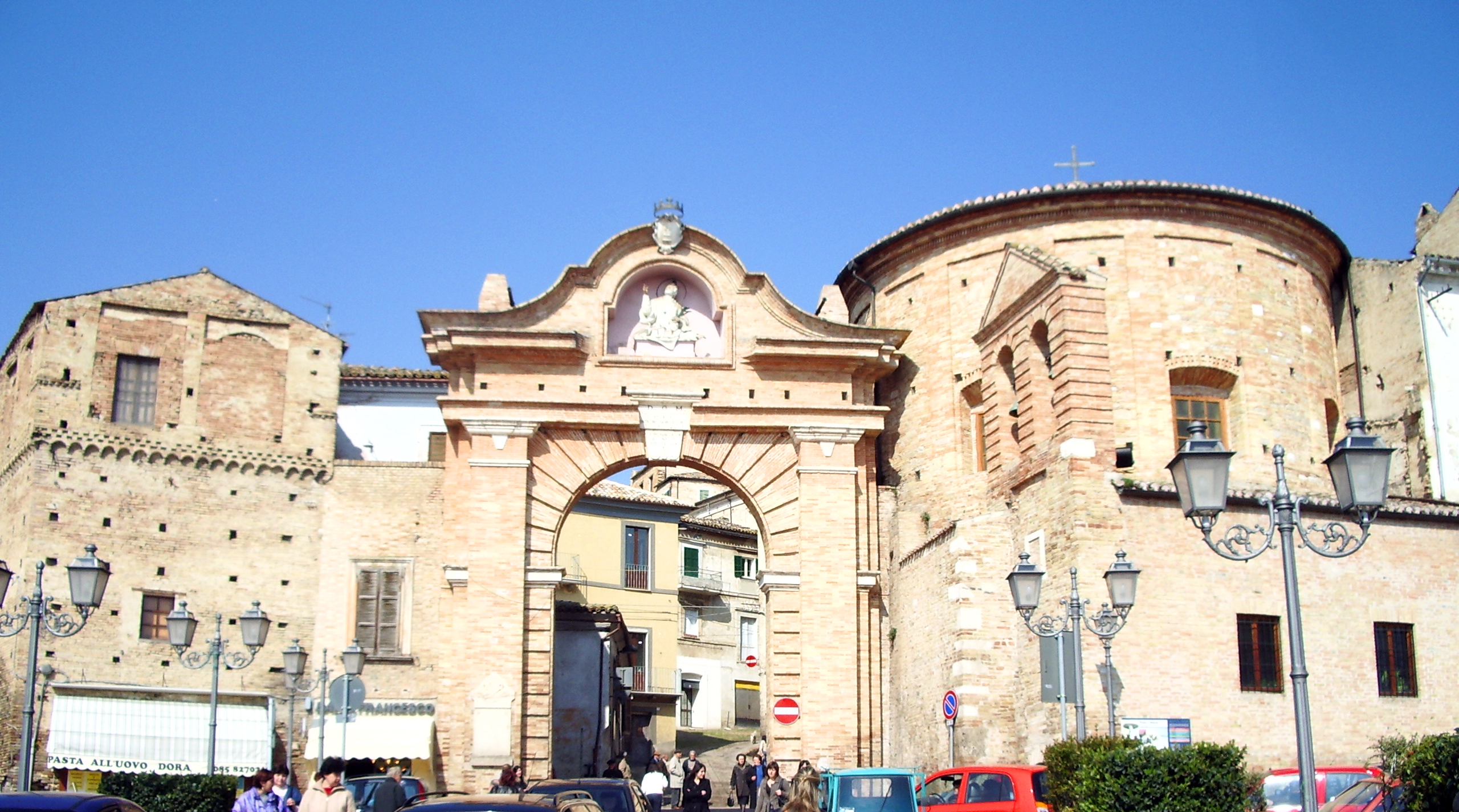
Penne

- L'Aquila
- Pescara
- Teramo
- Chieti
- Vasto
- Sulmona
- Lanciano
- Giulianova
- Ortona
- Penne
- Atri
- Guardiagrele

=== The most beautiful villages in Italy ===
Abruzzo has many small and picturesque villages, 26 of them have been selected by I Borghi più belli d'Italia (English: The most beautiful Villages of Italy), a non-profit private association of small Italian towns of strong historical and artistic interest, that was founded on the initiative of the Tourism Council of the National Association of Italian Municipalities.

- Abbateggio
- Anversa degli Abruzzi
- Bugnara
- Campli
- Caramanico Terme
- Casoli
- Castel del Monte
- Castelli
- Città Sant'Angelo
- Civitella del Tronto
- Crecchio
- Guardiagrele
- Navelli
- Opi
- Pacentro
- Palena
- Penne
- Pescocostanzo
- Pettorano sul Gizio
- Pietracamela
- Pretoro
- Rocca San Giovanni
- Santo Stefano di Sessanio
- Scanno
- Tagliacozzo
- Villalago

=== Shrines ===
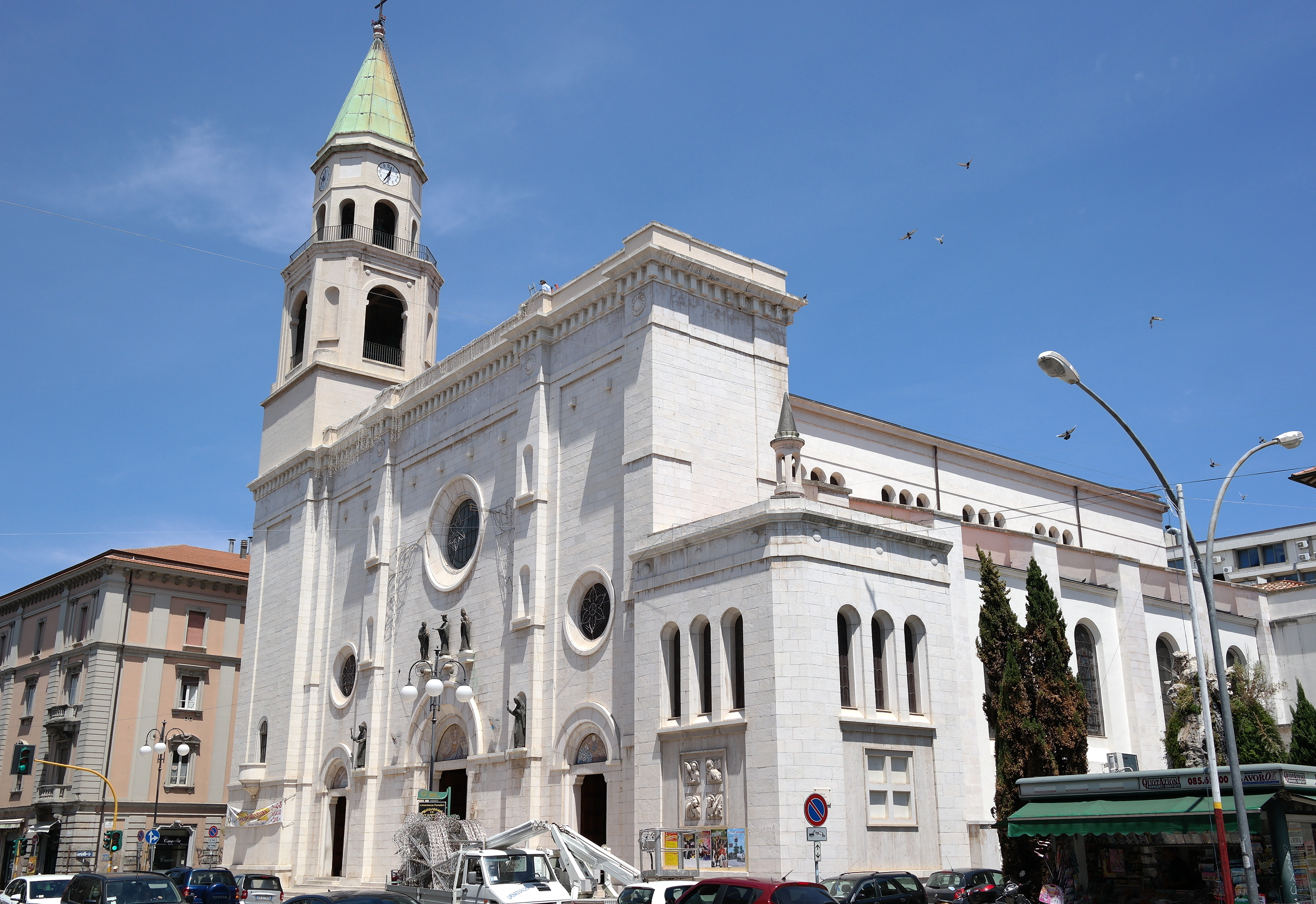
Pescara Cathedral

- Teramo Cathedral
- Sulmona Cathedral
- Santa Maria di Collemaggio
- Pescara Cathedral
- Santa Maria del Suffragio
- St. Gabriel's shrine

=== Museums ===
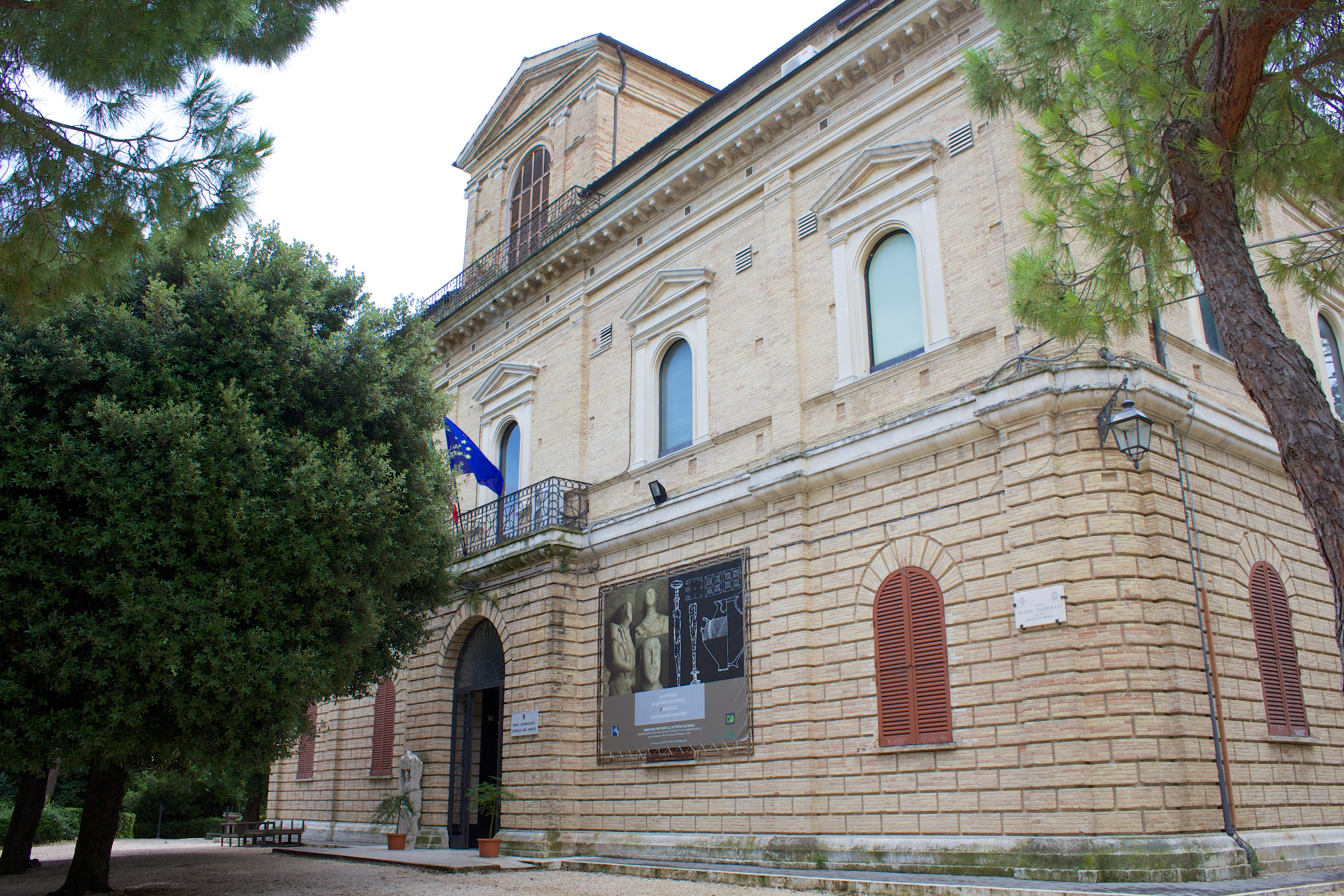
Museo Archeologico Nazionale d'Abruzzo

- Museo Nazionale d'Abruzzo
- Basilio Cascella Civic Museum
- Imago Museum
- Museo Civico di Teramo
- Museo d'Arte Moderna Vittoria Colonna
- Museo Paparella Treccia Devlet
- Taverna ducale, Popoli

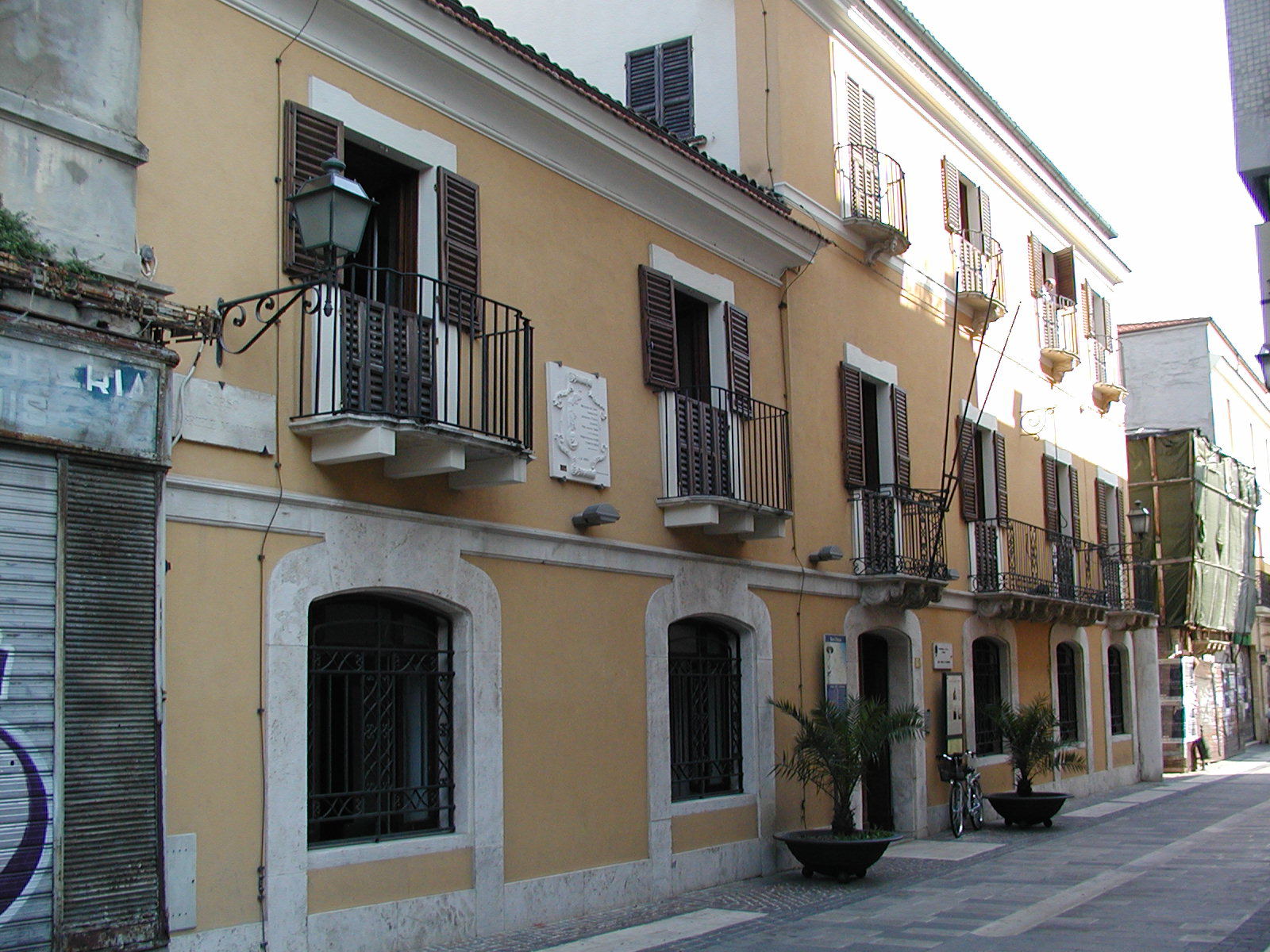
Birthplace of Gabriele D'Annunzio Museum

- Birthplace of Gabriele D'Annunzio Museum
- Chieti Museum of Biomedical Sciences
- Museo archeologico Francesco Savini
- Museo Archeologico Nazionale d'Abruzzo
- Museo Archeologico Nazionale di Campli
- Museo capitolare di Atri
- Museo civico archeologico Antonio De Nino
- Museo civico aufidenate
- Museo civico aufidenate Antonio De Nino
- Museo civico di Cerchio
- Museo d'Arte Sacra della Marsica
- Museo del duomo di Guardiagrele
- Museo delle Genti d'Abruzzo
- Museo diocesano di Lanciano
- Museo diocesano di Sulmona
- Museo Paludi di Celano

=== Castles ===
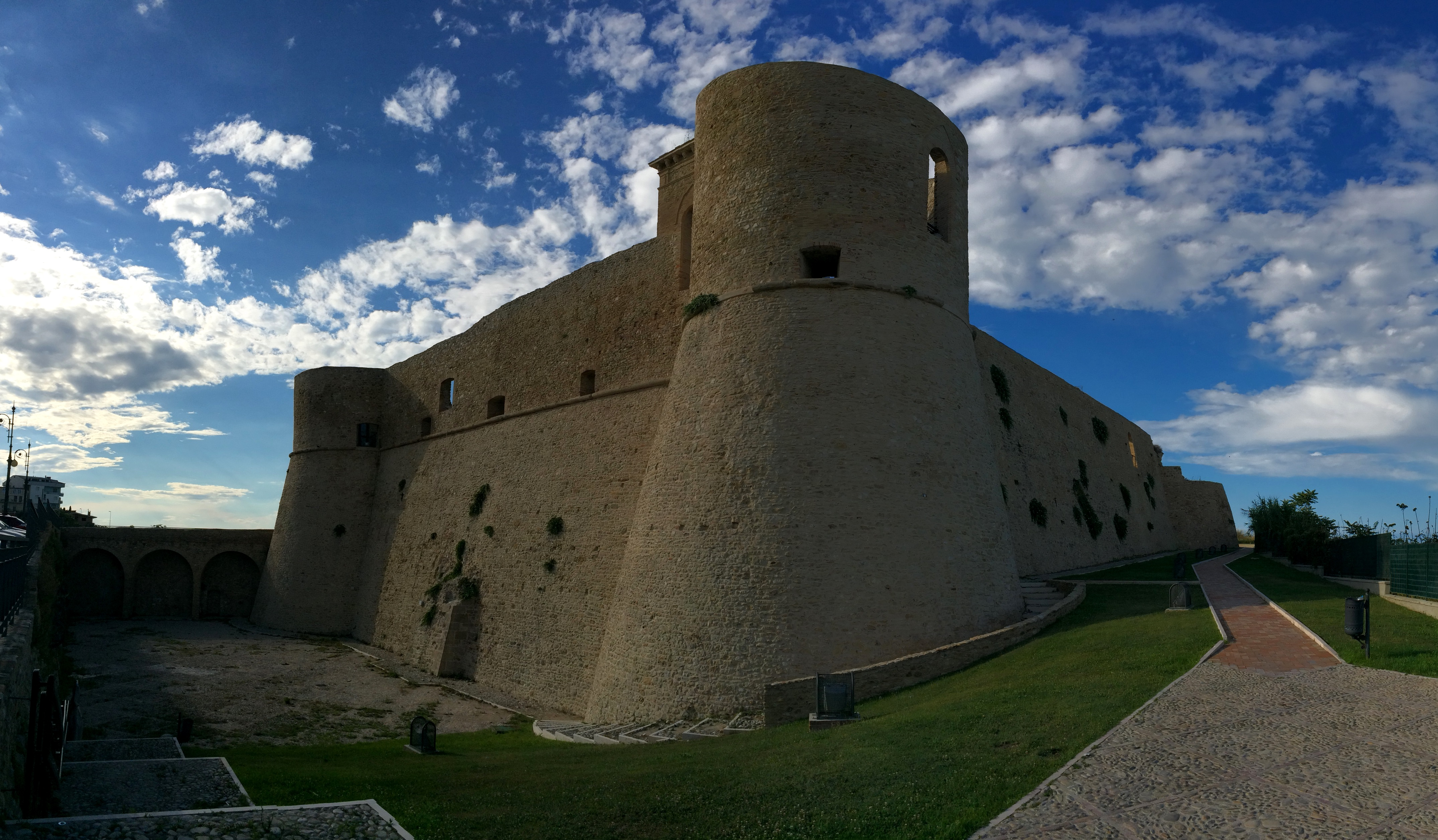
Castello Aragonese, Ortona

- Castello aragonese (Ortona)
- Castello Baglioni
- Castle of Barisciano
- Palazzo baronale
- Castle of Bominaco
- Castello Caldora
- Castello Caldora, Civitaluparella
- Castello Caldoresco
- Castel Camponeschi
- Cantelmo Castle
- Castello Caracciolo
- Castello di Carsoli
- Castelfraiano

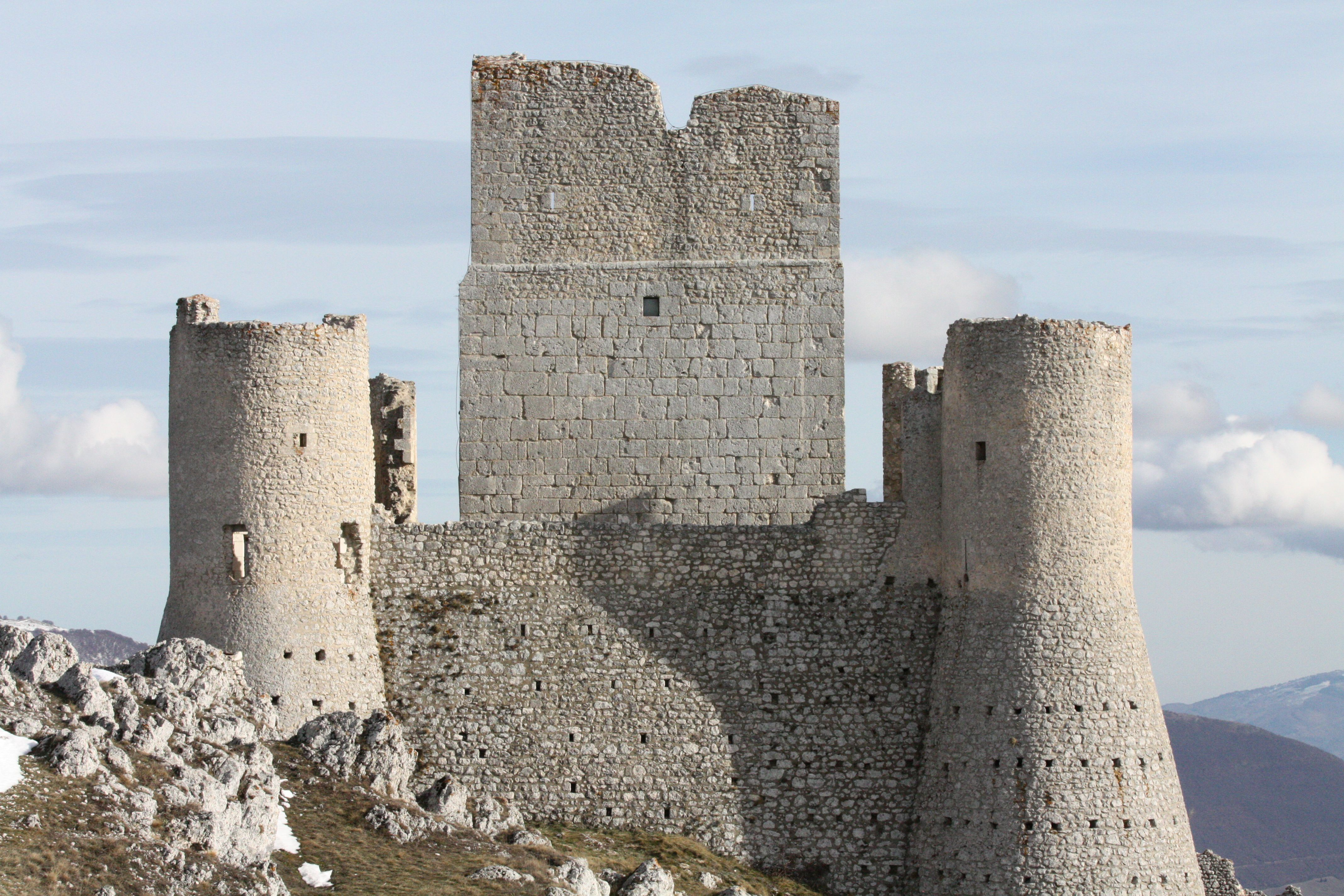
Castle of Rocca Calascio

- Castle of Rocca Calascio
- Fortezza di Civitella del Tronto
- Castello ducale di Crecchio
- Castello De Sanctis
- Castello De Sterlich-Aliprandi
- Castello ducale Cantelmo
- Castle of Carpineto Sinello
- Forte Spagnolo, L'Aquila
- Castle of Fossa
- Castello Franceschelli
- Castello di Gagliano Aterno
- Castello di Gamberale

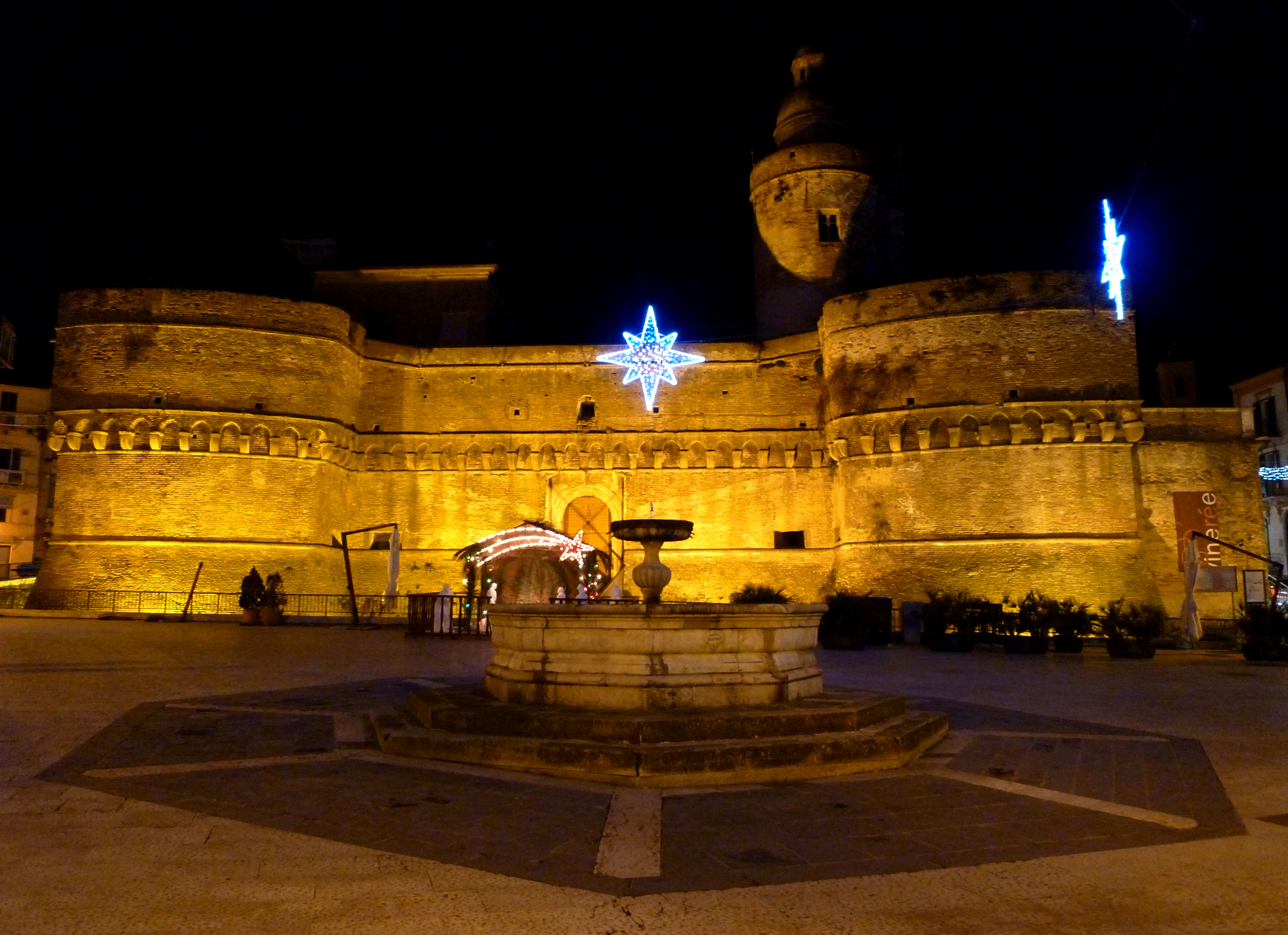
Castello Caldoresco, Vasto

- Castello Gizzi
- Castel Manfrino
- Castello marchesale
- Castello Masciantonio
- Castello Mediceo
- Castel Menardo
- Castello di Monteodorisio
- Norman Castle (Anversa degli Abruzzi)
- Castle of Ocre
- Castello di Oricola
- Castello Orsini
- Orsini-Colonna Castle
- Castello di Ortona dei Marsi
- Castello di Pereto
- Castello Piccolomini (Balsorano)
- Castello Piccolomini (Capestrano)

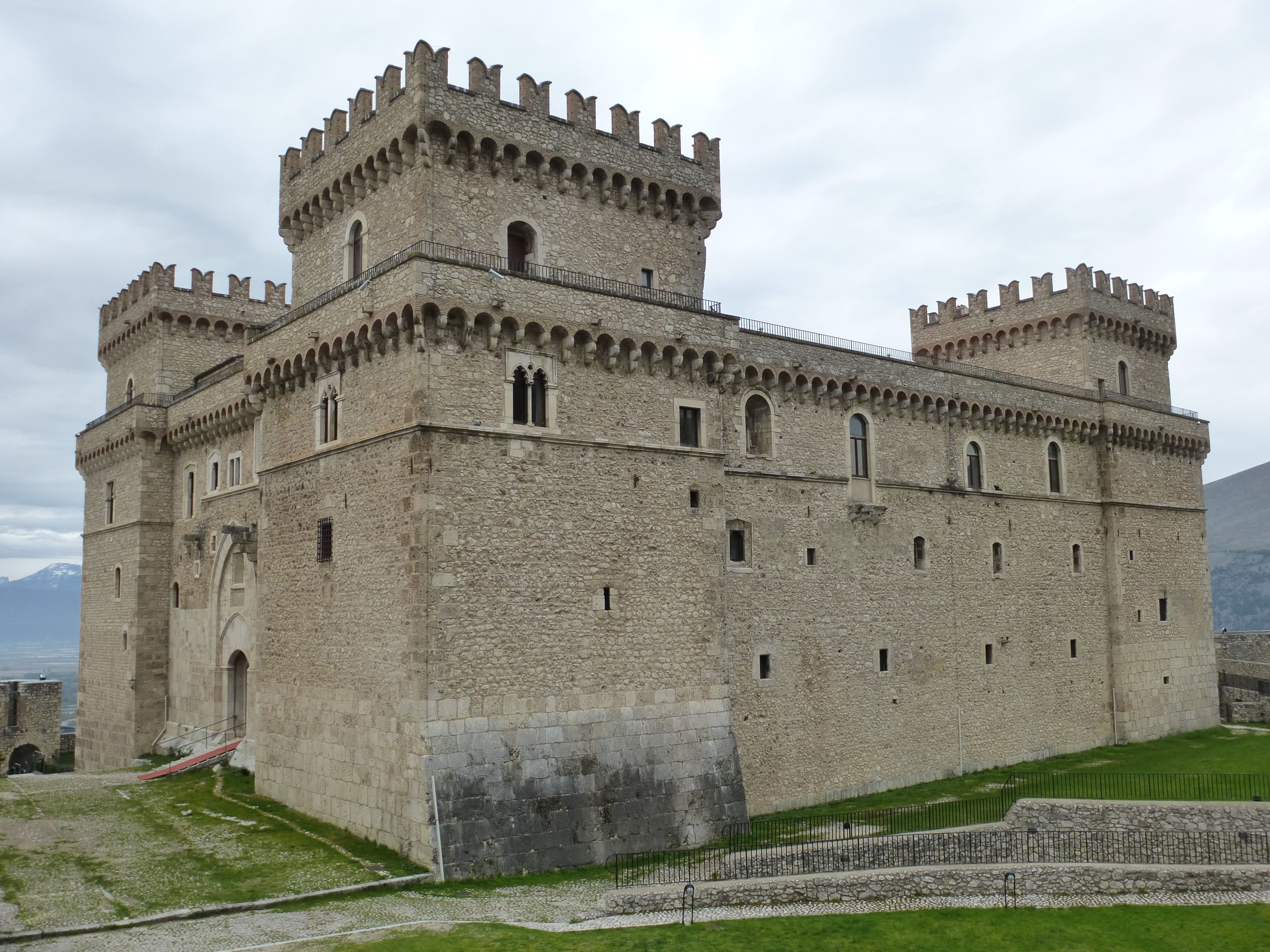
Castello Piccolomini (Celano)

- Castello Piccolomini (Celano)
- Castello Piccolomini (Ortucchio)
- Rocca di Villalago
- Rocca Orsini
- Castello di Roccascalegna
- Castello di Salle
- Castle of San Pio delle Camere
- Castle of Sant'Eusanio Forconese

=== Abbeys and Monasteries ===
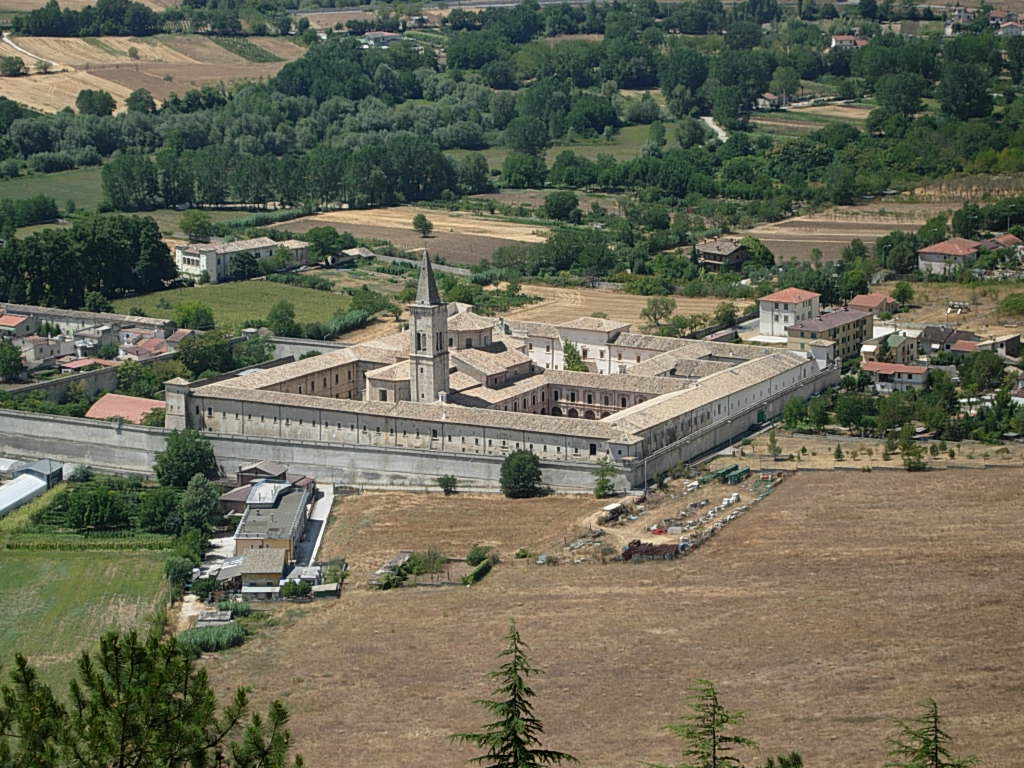
Abbey of the Holy Spirit at Monte Morrone, Sulmona

- Abbey of San Clemente a Casauria
- Abbey of San Clemente al Volmano
- San Giovanni in Venere Abbey
- San Liberatore a Maiella
- Abbey of Santa Lucia
- Santa Maria Arabona
- Santa Maria di Propezzano
- Abbey of the Holy Spirit at Monte Morrone, Sulmona

=== Hermitages ===
- Hermitage of Sant'Angelo, Lettomanoppello
- Hermitage of Sant'Angelo, Palombaro
- Hermitage of Saint Anthony
- Hermitage of San Bartolomeo in Legio
- Hermitage of San Domenico
- Hermitage of Sant'Egidio
- Hermitage of San Germano
- Hermitage of San Giovanni all'Orfento

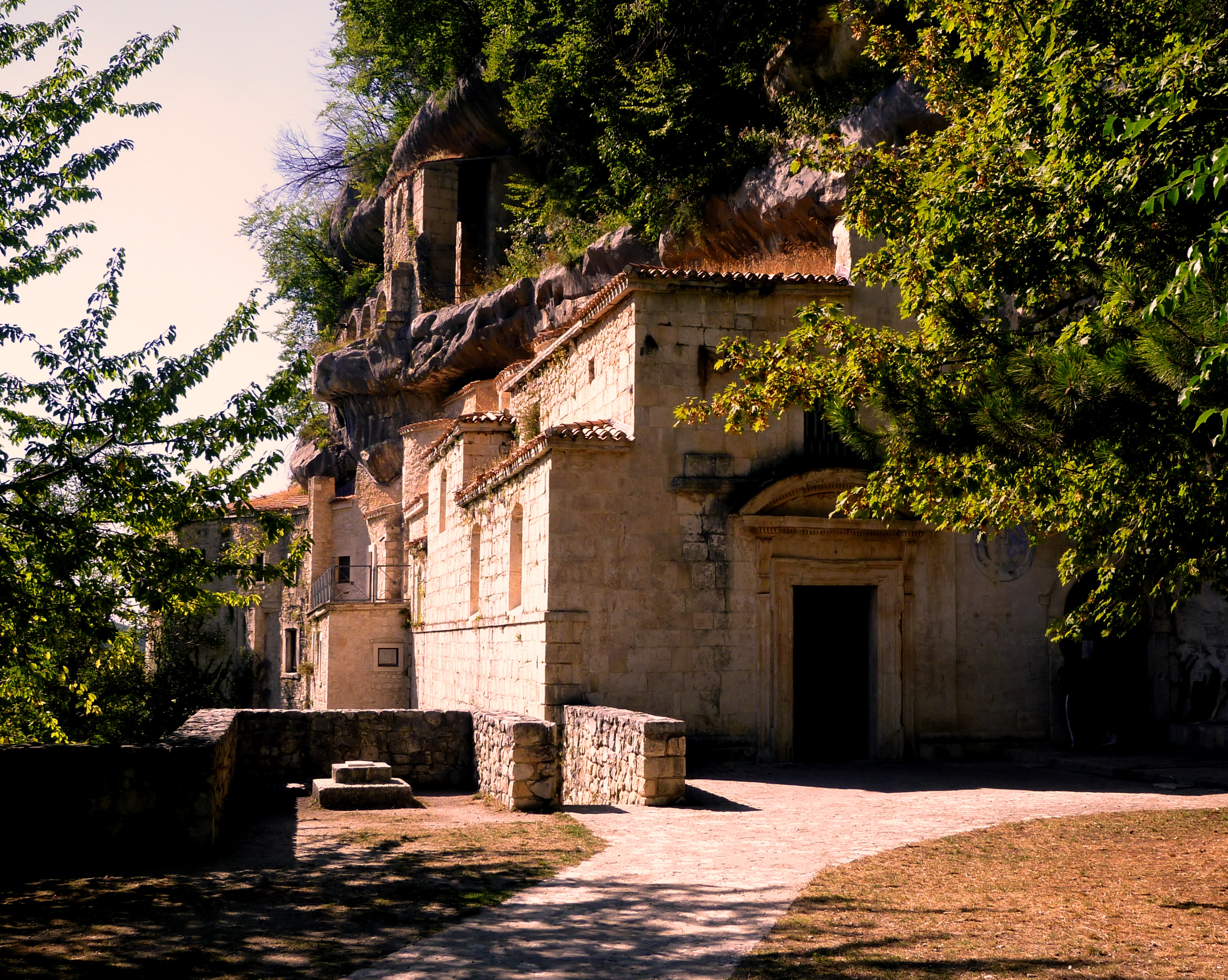
Hermitage Santo Spirito a Majella

- Hermitage of Madonna dell'Altare
- Hermitage of Madonna di Coccia
- Hermitage of Santa Maria del Cauto
- Hermitage of San Michele Arcangelo, Pescocostanzo
- Hermitage of Sant'Onofrio al Morrone
- Hermitage of Sant'Onofrio, Serramonacesca
- Rock-cut complex of San Liberatore
- Rock-cut tombs of San Liberatore
- Hermitage of Santo Spirito a Majella
- Hermitage of San Venanzio, Raiano

=== Archaeological sites ===
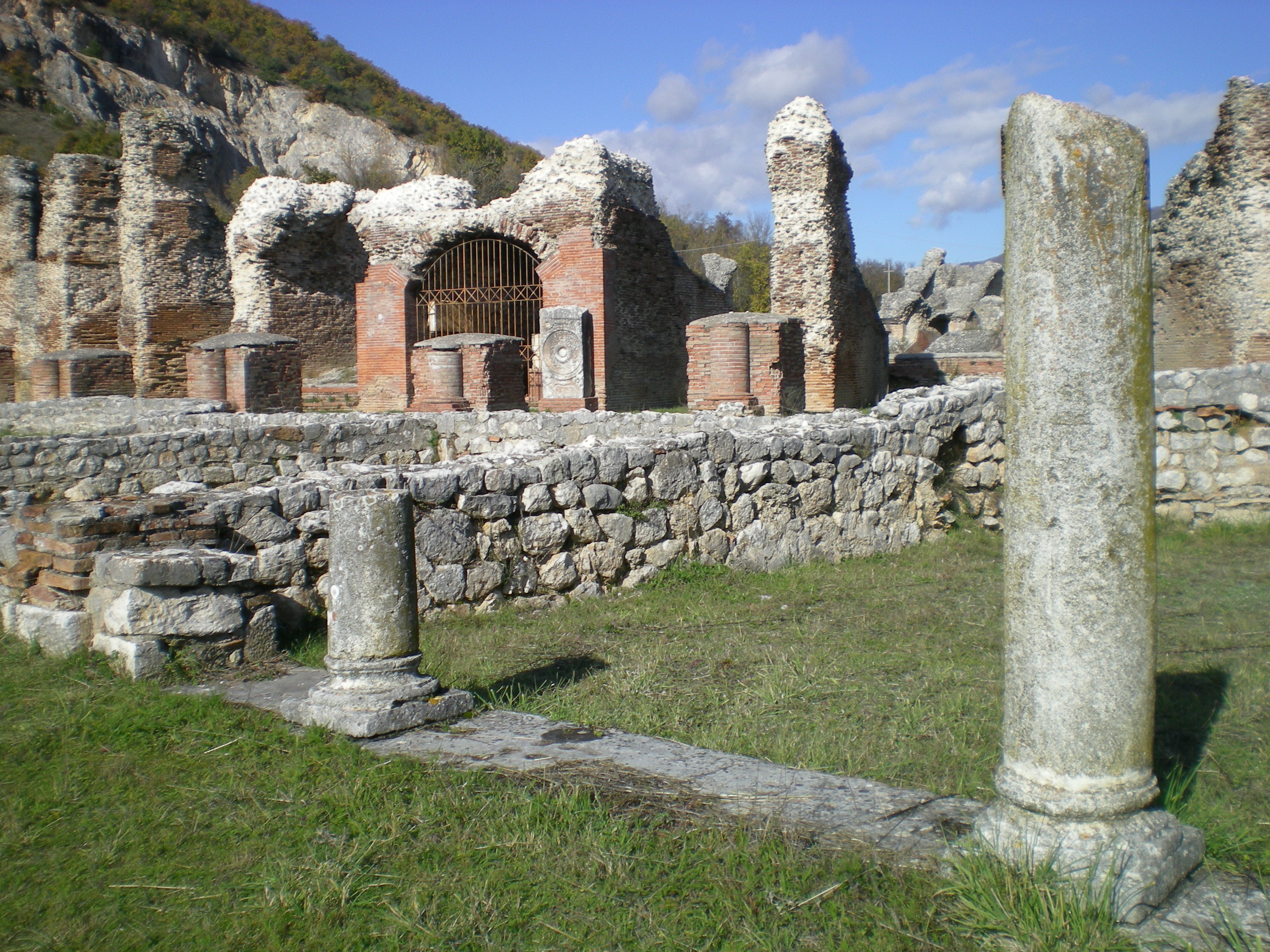
Amiternum

- Alba Fucens
- Amiternum
- Aufina
- Corfinium
- Juvanum
- Lucus Angitiae
- Necropolis of Fossa
- Ocriticum
- Peltuinum
- Shrine of Hercules Curinus
- Tunnels of Claudius

== Annual statistics ==
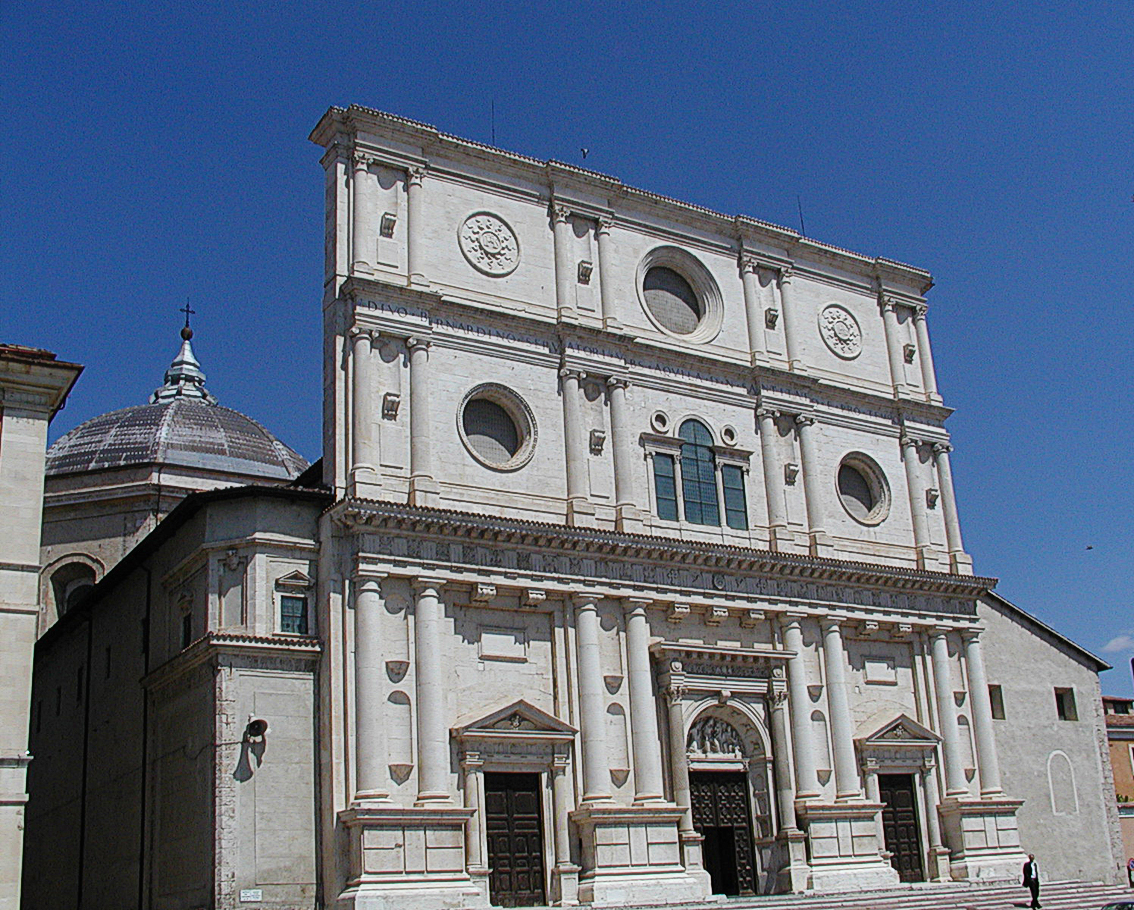
Basilica of San Bernardino

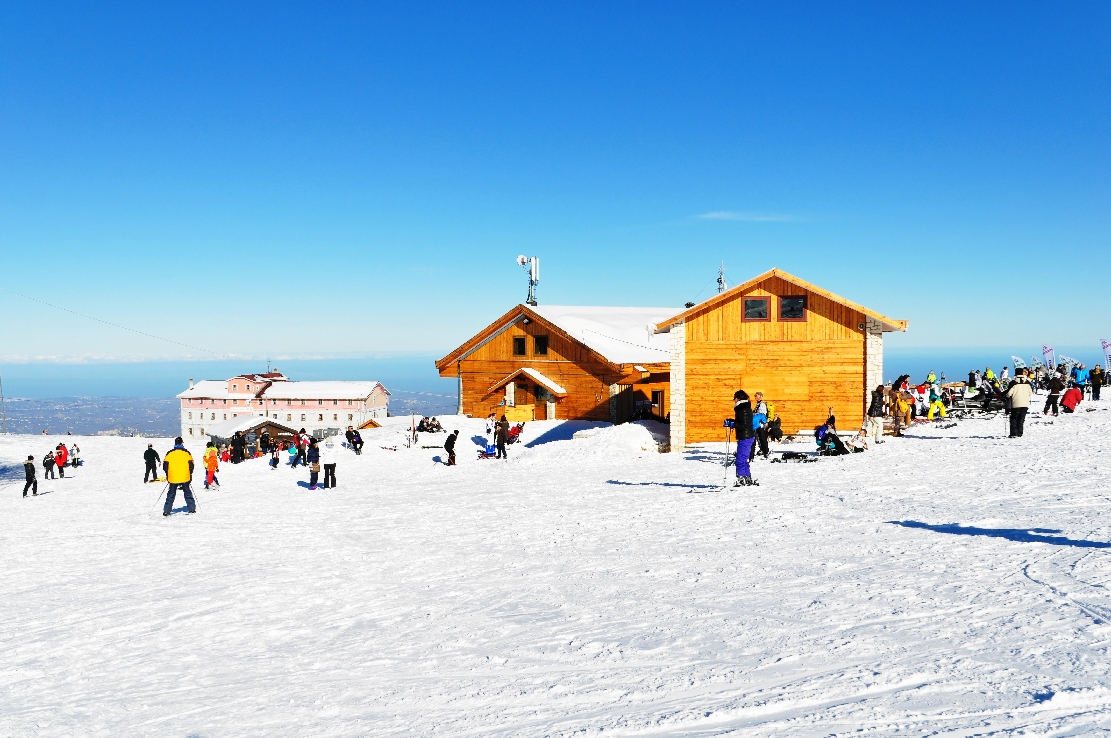
Majella National Park Winter

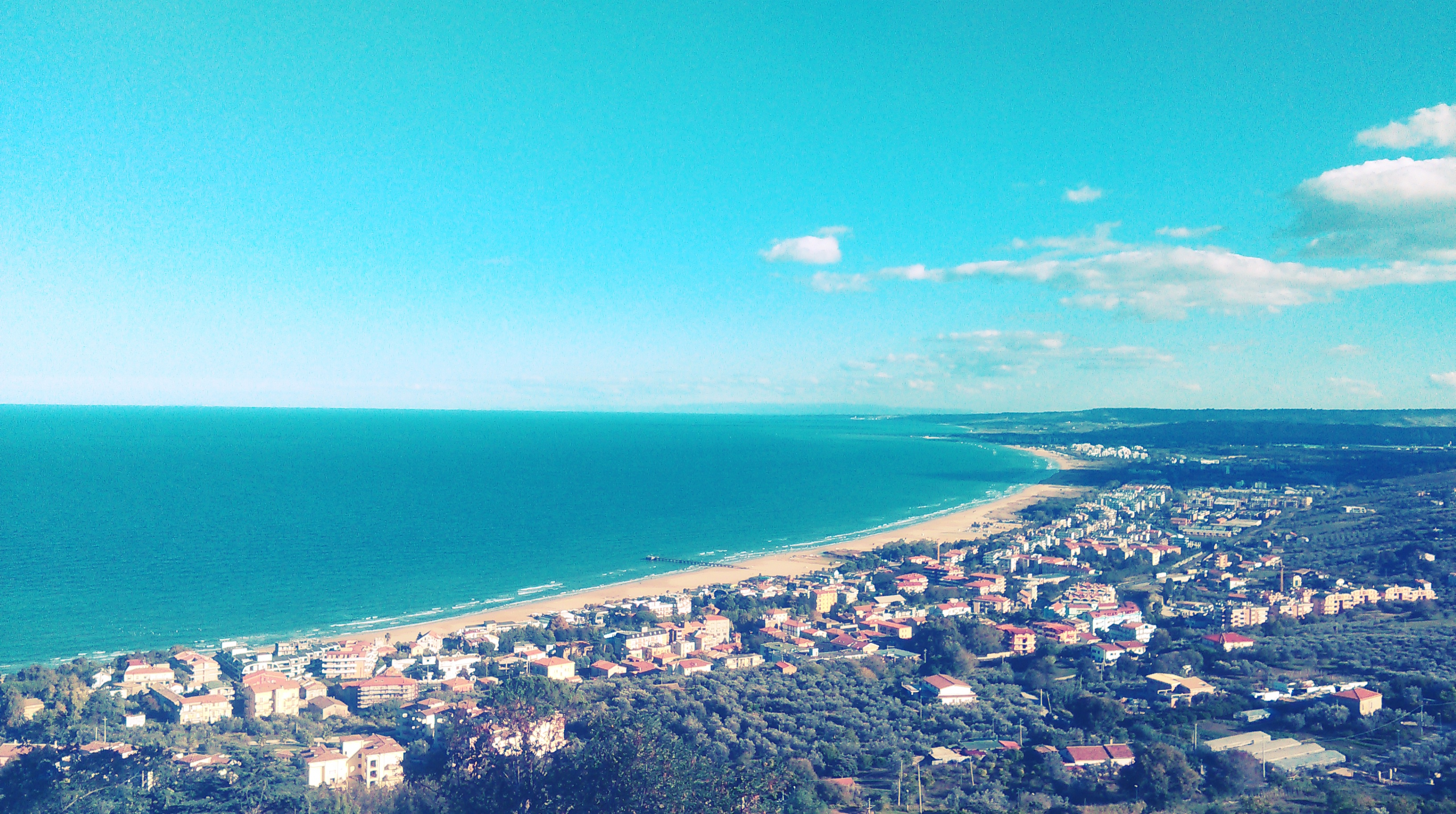
Marina di Vasto and the Golfo di Vasto in the Adriatic Sea, seen from Vasto

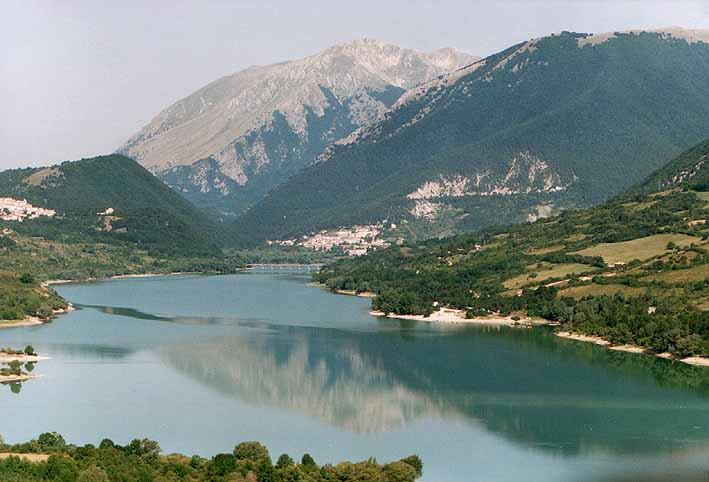
Lake Barrea and Mount Marsicano

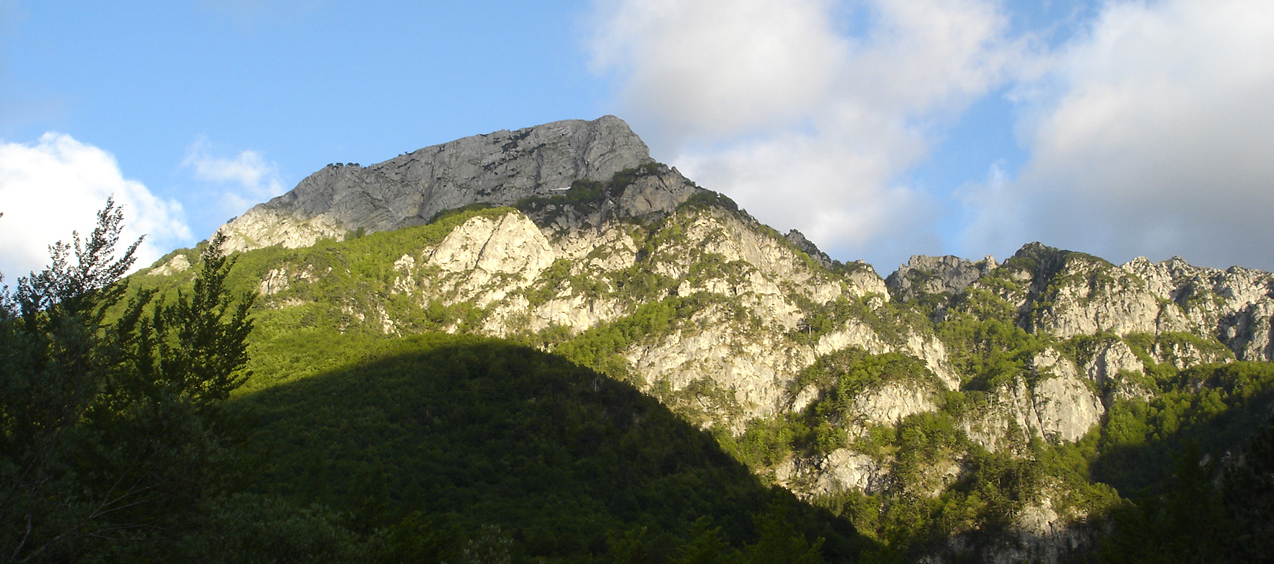
Abruzzo, Lazio and Molise National Park

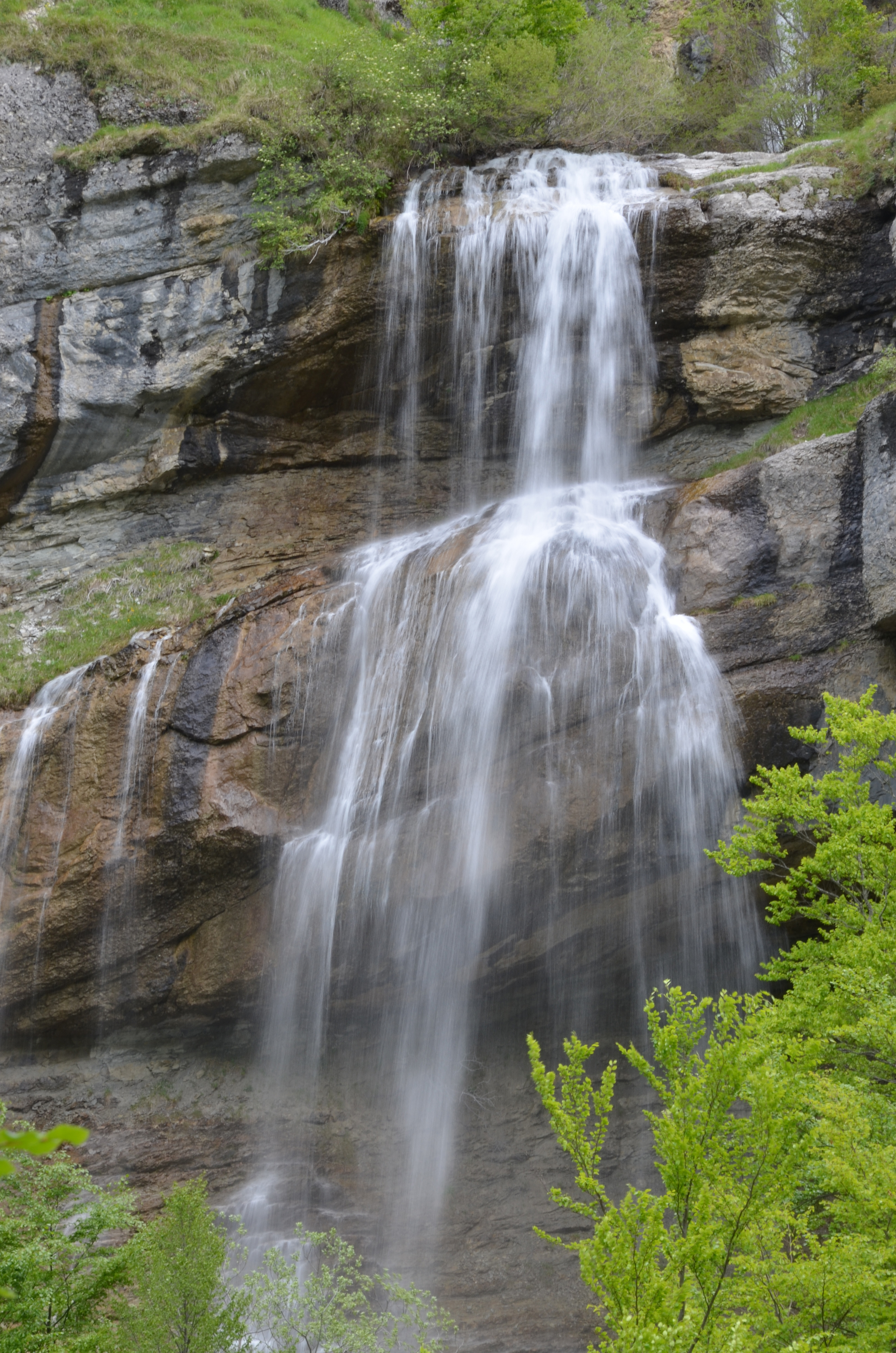
Cascata delle Barche

Year	Tourist arrivals	Change	Ref.
2021	1,330,887	▲	
2020	1,069,867	▼	
2019	1,643,166	▲	
2018	1,643,111	▲	
2017	1,548,653	▲	
2016	1,526,452	▲	
2015	1,522,087	▲	
2014	1,391,957	▼	
2013	1,500,010	▼	
2012	1,579,436	▼	
2011	1,580,971	▲	
2010	1,485,147	▲	
2009	1,341,525	▼	
2008	1,636,498	▲	
2007	1,560,806	▼	
2006	1,578,587	▲	
2005	1,503,432	▲	
2004	1.425.563	▼	
2003	1.428.019	▲	
2002	1.346.414	▲	
2001	1.320.146	▲	
2000	1.273.797		

Year	Tourist overnight stays	Change	Ref.
2021	5,197,765	▲	
2020	4,012,792	▼	
2019	6,176,702	▼	
2018	6,335,122	▲	
2017	6,193,473	▲	
2016	6,119,103	▼	
2015	6,177,230	▼	
2014	6,282,824	▼	
2013	6,909,216	▼	
2012	7,254,977	▼	
2011	7,423,774	▲	
2010	7,307,229	▲	
2009	6,659,108	▼	
2008	7,560,546	▲	
2007	7,374,645	▼	
2006	7,452,113	▲	
2005	6,987,992	▲	
2004	6,933,452	▼	
2003	7,120,250	▲	
2002	6,864,349	▲	
2001	6,675,864	▲	
2000	6,287,888		

== Gallery ==
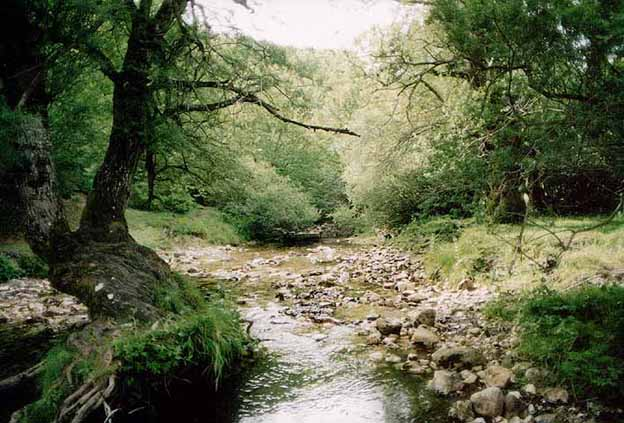
A view of the National Park of Abruzzo, Lazio and Molise

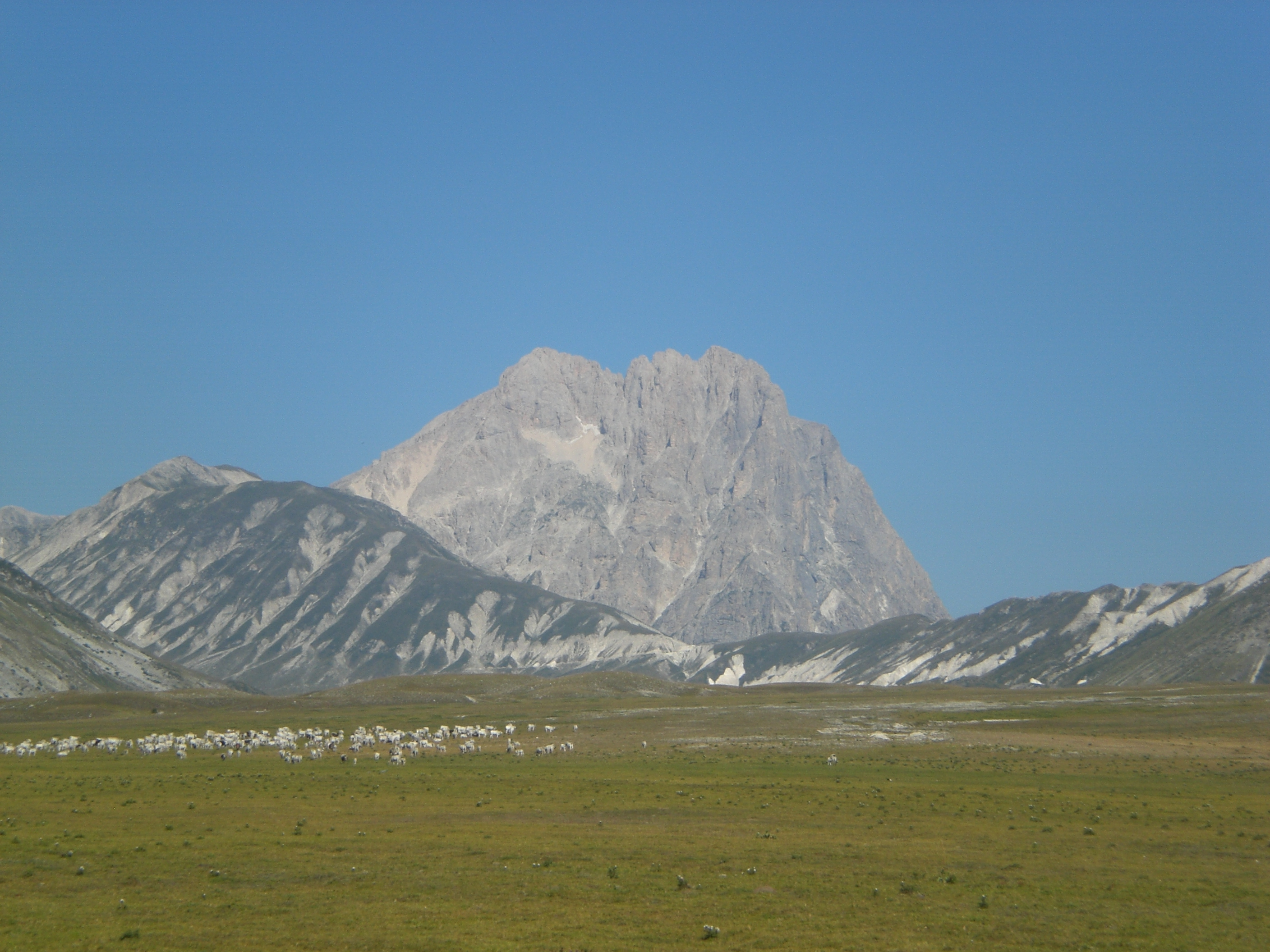
Gran Sasso Mountain

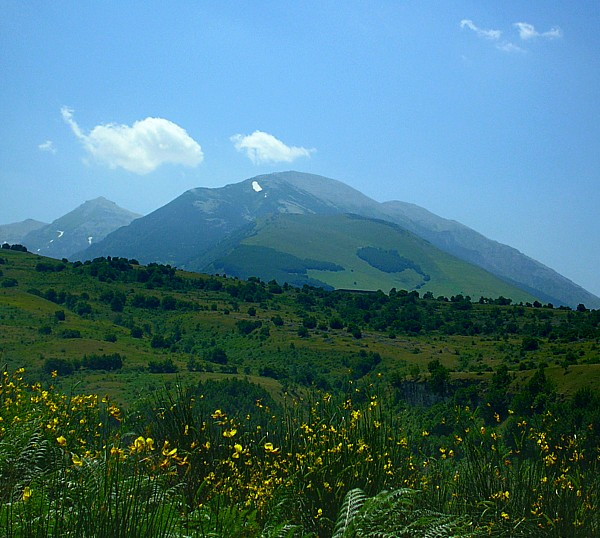
Majella Massif

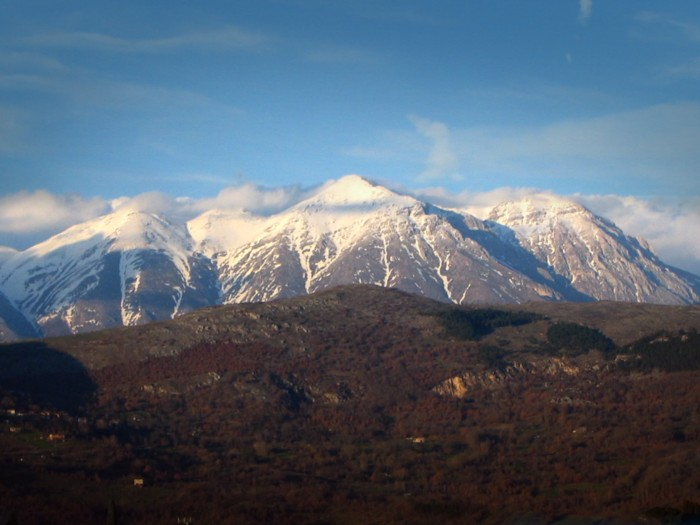
Velino Massif

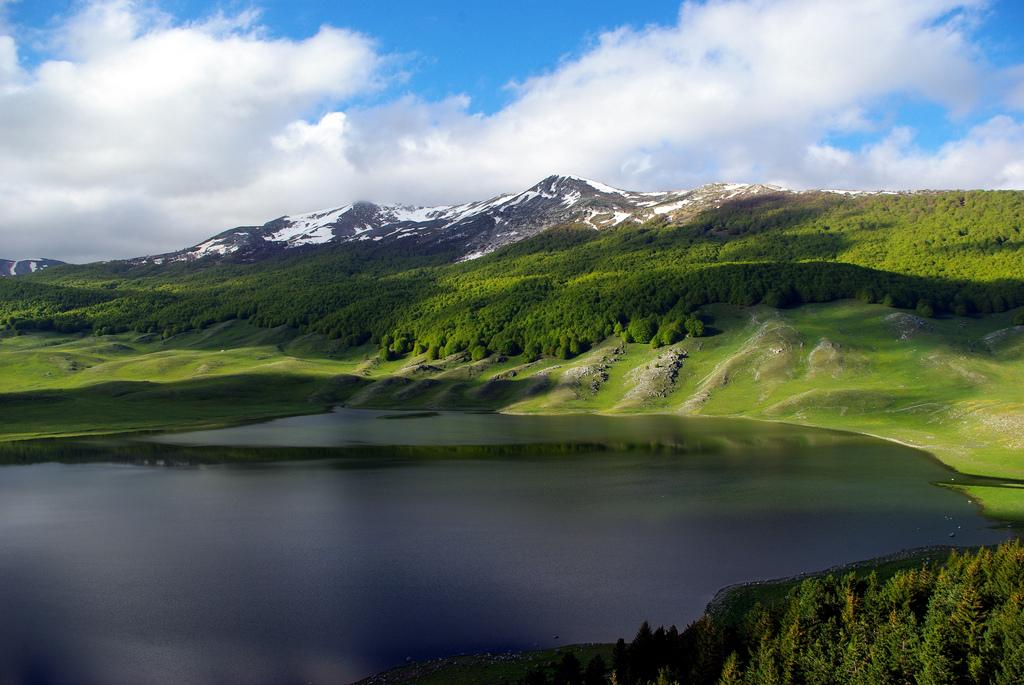
Campo Felice lake in spring

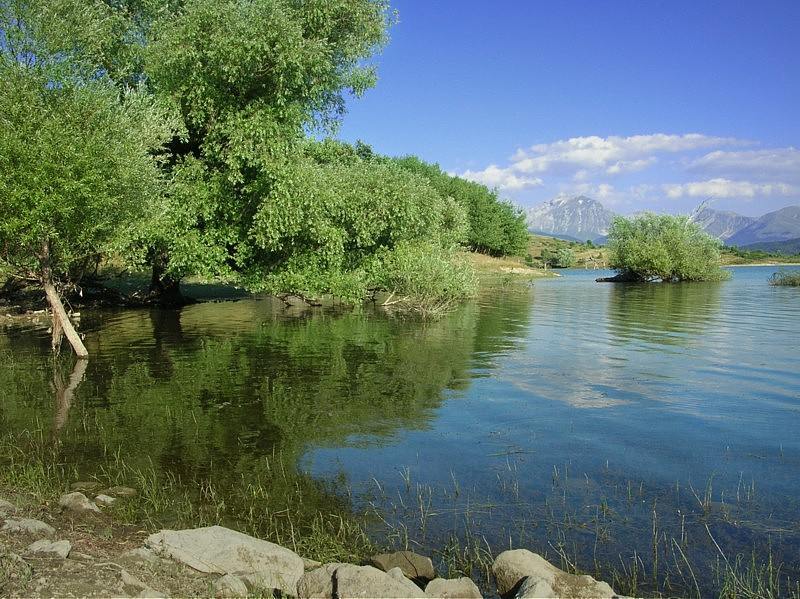
Campotosto Lake

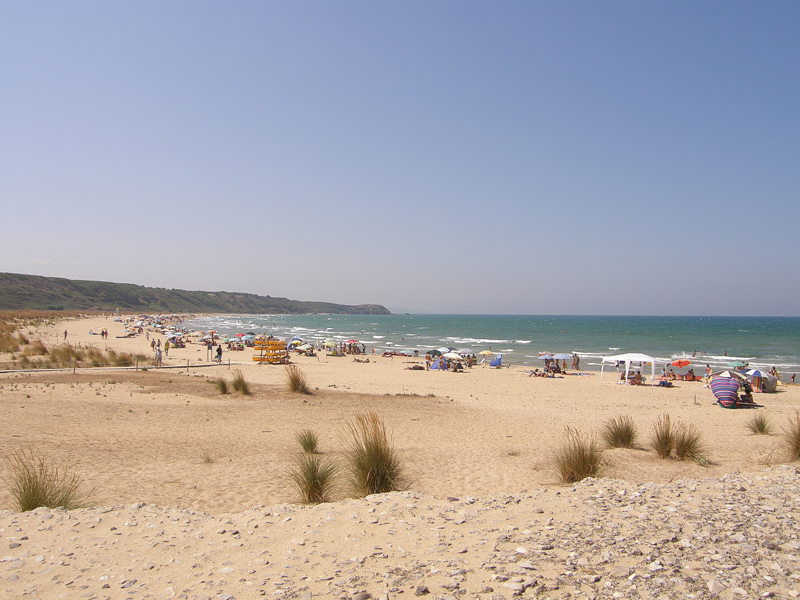
Vasto:Punta della Penna Beach

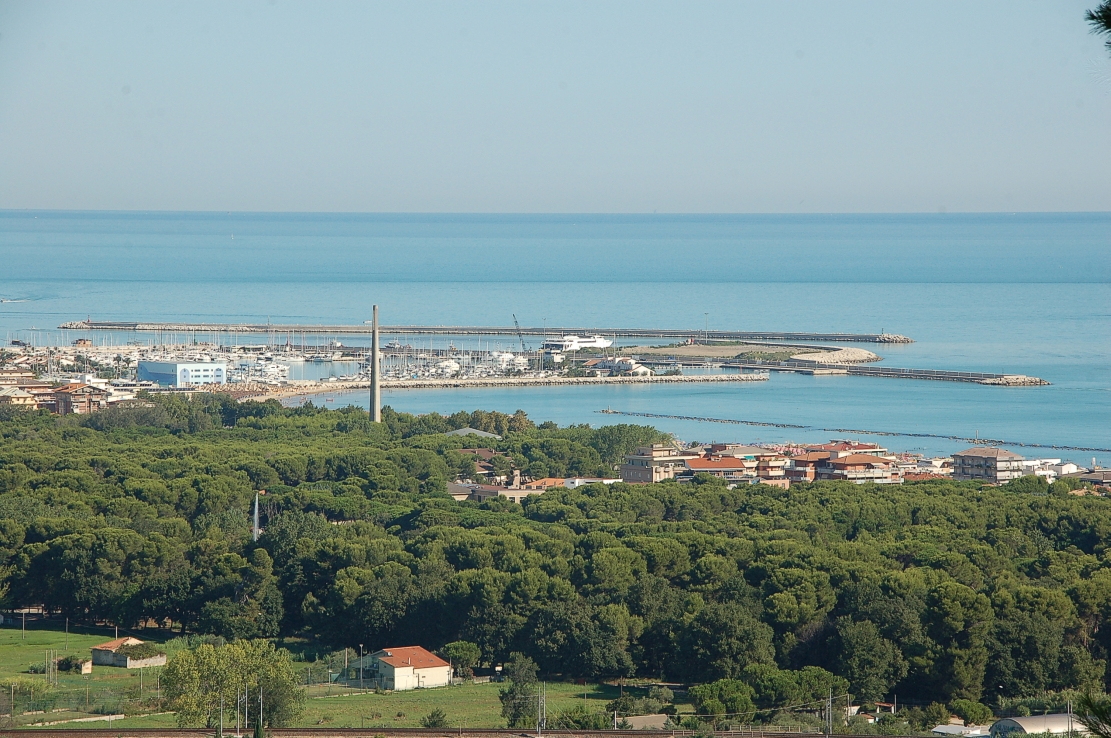
Pescara

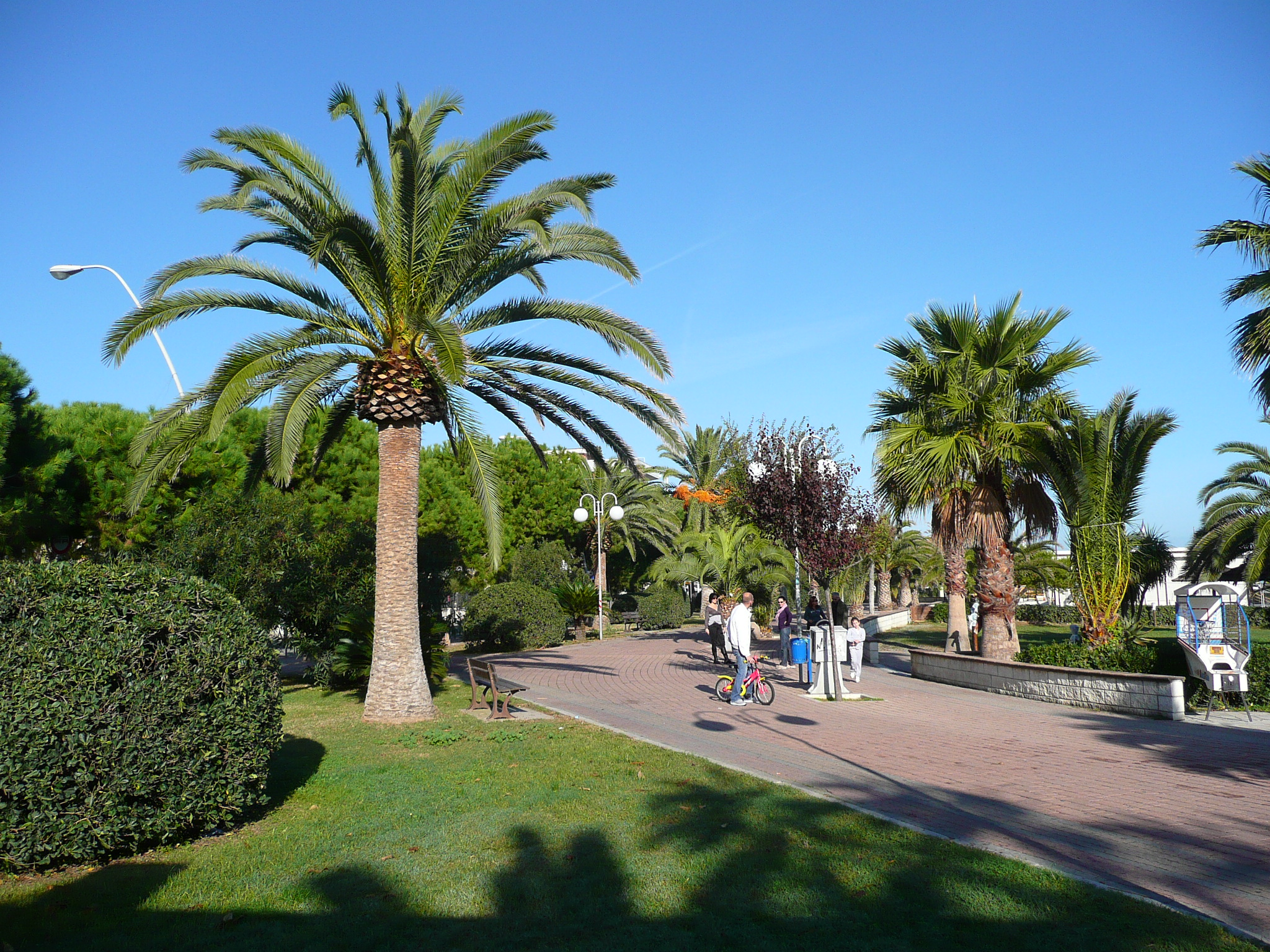
Promenade in Tortoreto Lido

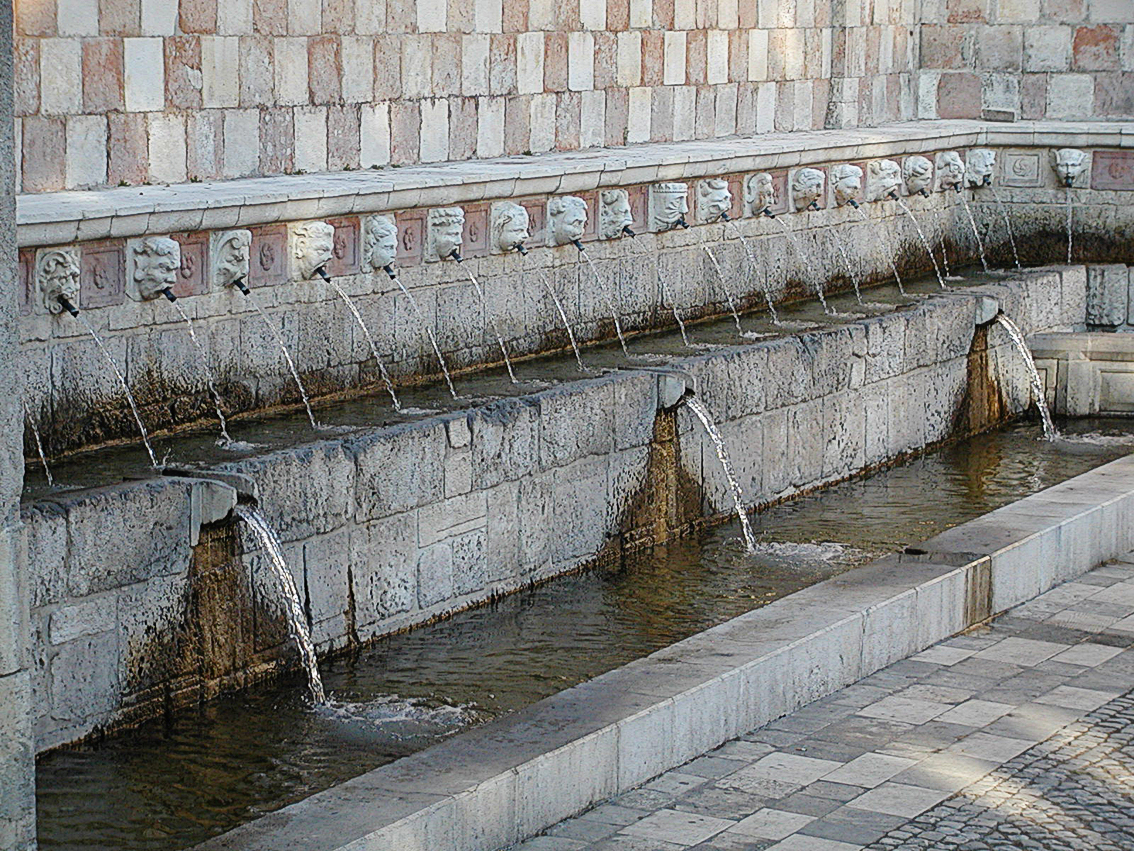
L'Aquila 99 Spouts Fountain

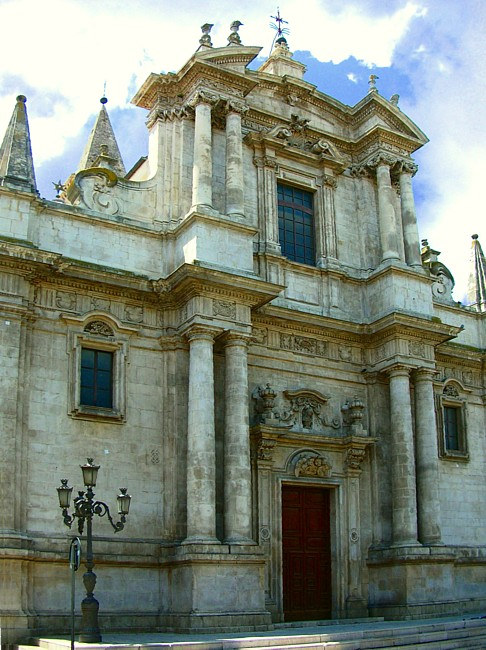
Church of SS Annunziata in Sulmona

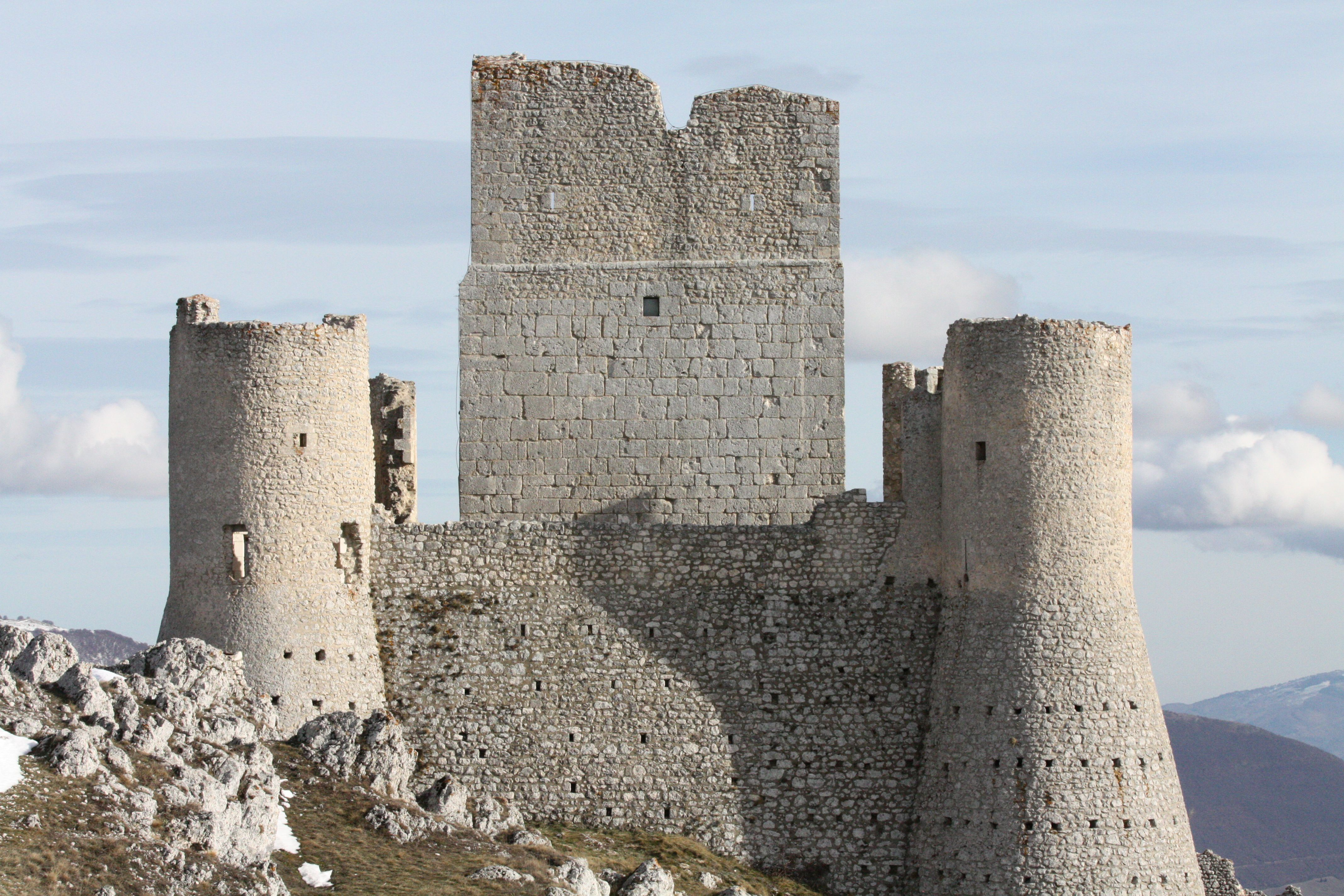
Rocca Calascio

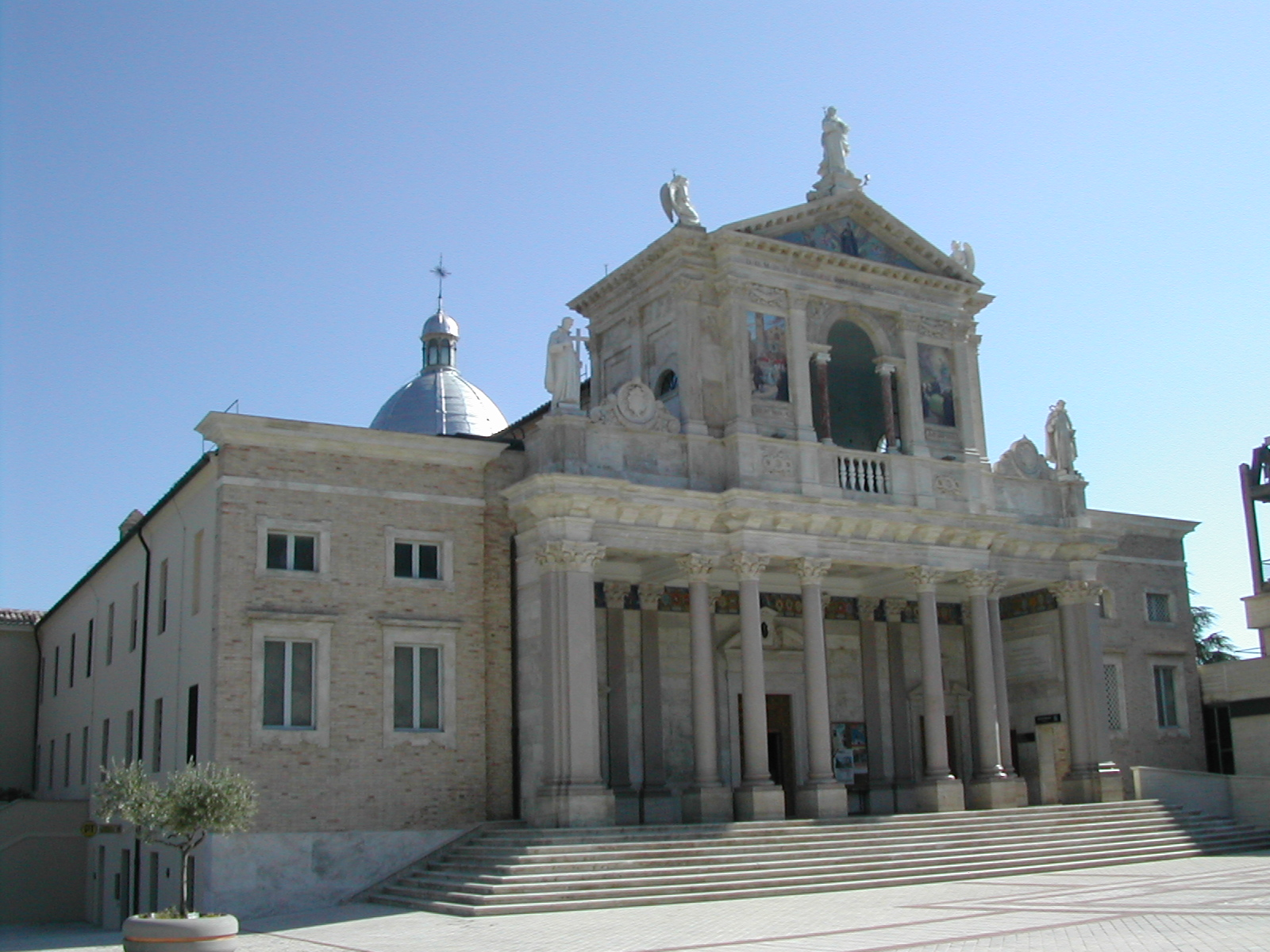
Shrine of Gabriel of Our Lady of Sorrows

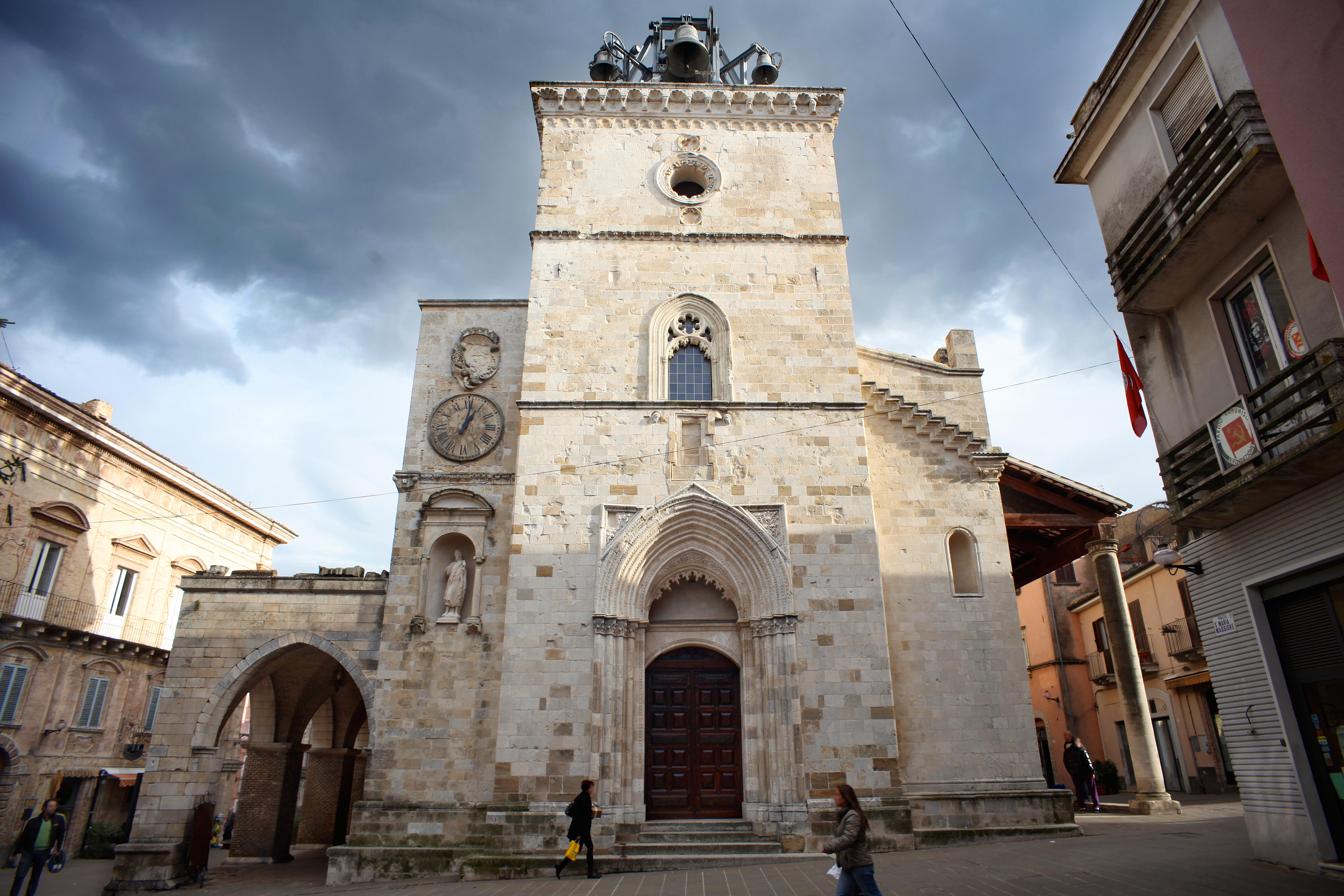
Guardiagrele

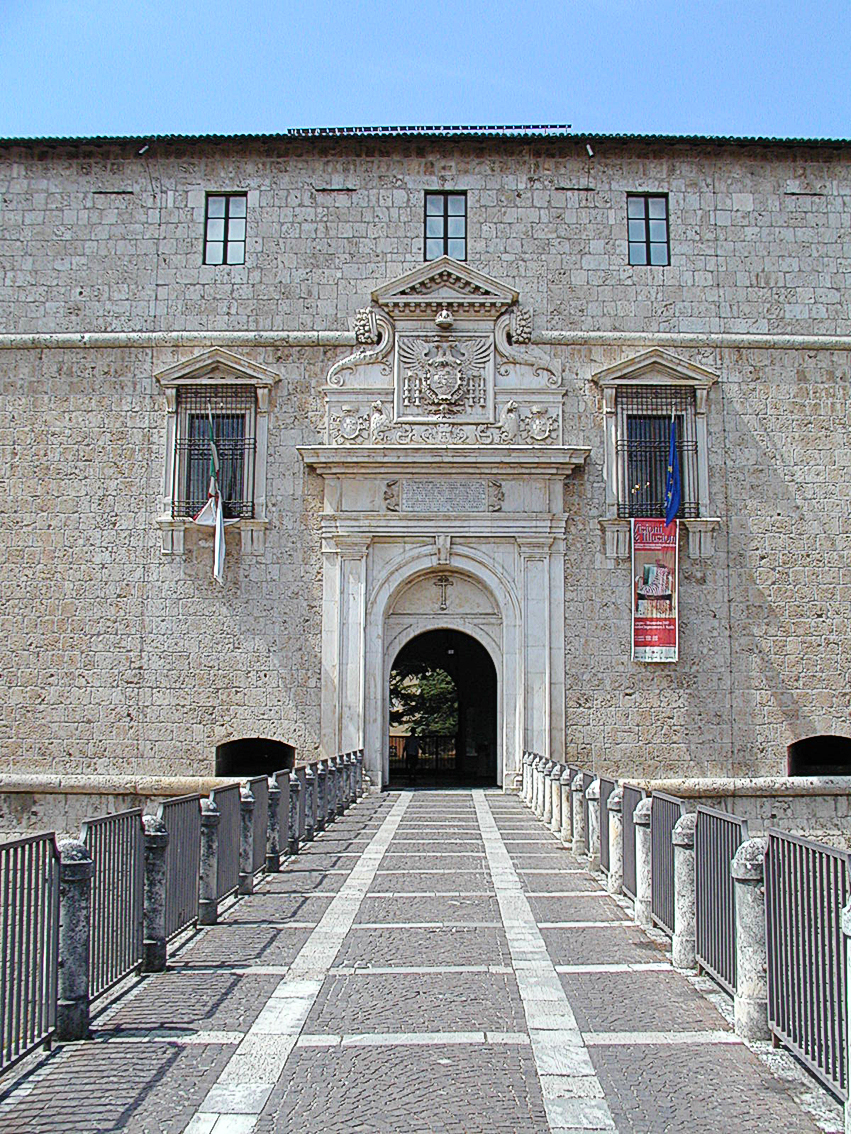
Forte Spagnolo (Museo Nazionale d'Abruzzo)

== See also ==
- Economy of Abruzzo
- Cuisine of Abruzzo
- Tourism in Italy
