= Cansano =

- Comune
- Comune di Cansano
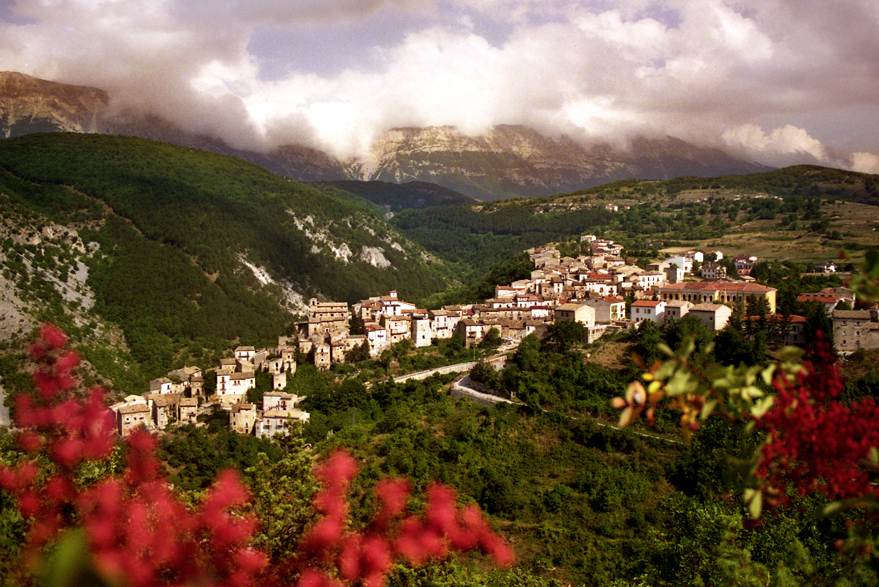

- Coat of arms

- Location within Italy Location within Abruzzo
- Coordinates: 42°0′19″N 14°0′46″E
- Country: Italy
- Region: Abruzzo
- Province: L'Aquila (AQ)

Government
  - Mayor: Mario Ciampaglione

Area
  - Total: 37.70 km^{2} (14.56 sq mi)
- Elevation: 835 m (2,740 ft)

Population (31 December 2021)
  - Total: 205
  - Density: 5.44/km^{2} (14.1/sq mi)
- Demonym: Cansanesi
- Time zone: UTC+1 (CET)
  - Summer (DST): UTC+2 (CEST)
- Postal code: 67030
- Dialing code: 0864
- Patron saint: John the Baptist
- Saint day: 24 June

Cansano (pronounced [kanˈsaːno]; Canẓánə in Abruzzese Neapolitan) is a comune in the province of L'Aquila in the Abruzzo region, central Italy. It is part of the Maiella National Park. Cansano is known for the archaeological discovery of the Italic and Roman town of Ocriticum, which has become an archaeological park.

== Geography and climate ==
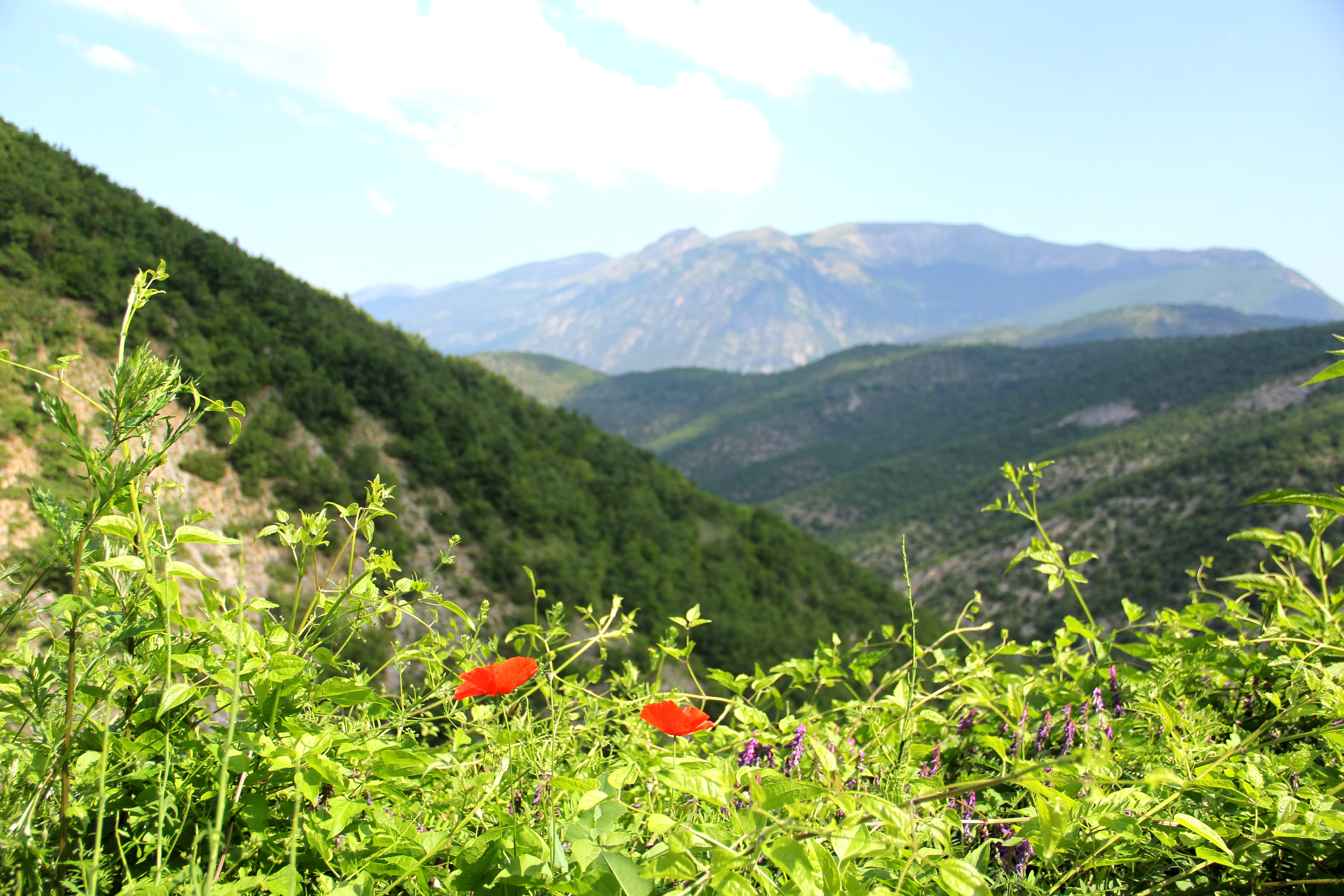
The countryside surrounding Cansano

Cansano is located 9 km (5.6 mi) from Sulmona, on a hill near the Valle Peligna, at 835 m (2,740 ft) m above sea level. The minimum altitude of the municipality of Cansano is 599 m (1,965 ft), while the maximum is 1,792 m (5,879 ft). The area of the municipal territory is 37.70 km^{2} (14.56 sq mi).

The town is part of an almost intact natural landscape. Part of the Maiella National Park is part of the town, and in particular, the Sant'Antonio wood and the San Leonardo pass. The position also favors travel to the most active tourist centers in the area; Campo di Giove, Pacentro, Pescocostanzo and Sulmona.

The town has a mountain climate, with hot, dry summers and cold, rainy winters. However, over time there have been variations in the climate, which is now slightly more humid in summer and less snowy in winter.

== History ==
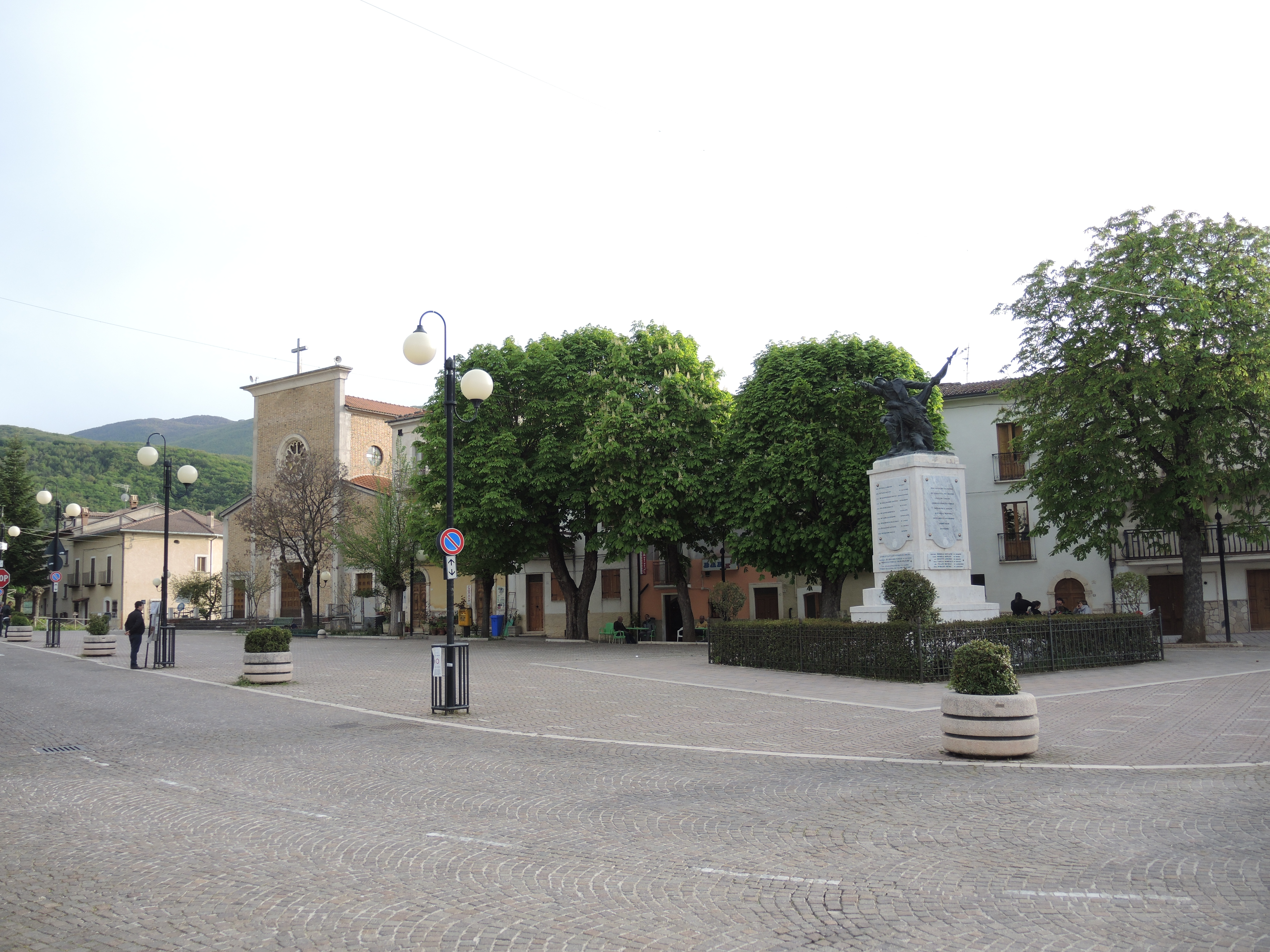
Piazza XX Settembre in Cansano

Built as a fiefdom and watchtower in the early Middle Ages, it spread mainly between the 19th and 20th centuries, following the 1706 Abruzzo earthquake. In 1904, Casano became an independent municipality. From 1807 to 1811, Cansano was a frazione of Introdacqua, then from that year until 1829 it was a frazione of Pacentro. It obtained municipal autonomy until 1846, when it was re-aggregated in Pacentro until 1855. Cansano become a frazione of Campo di Giove from 1855 to 1904, when it definitively regained municipal autonomy.

== Main sights ==
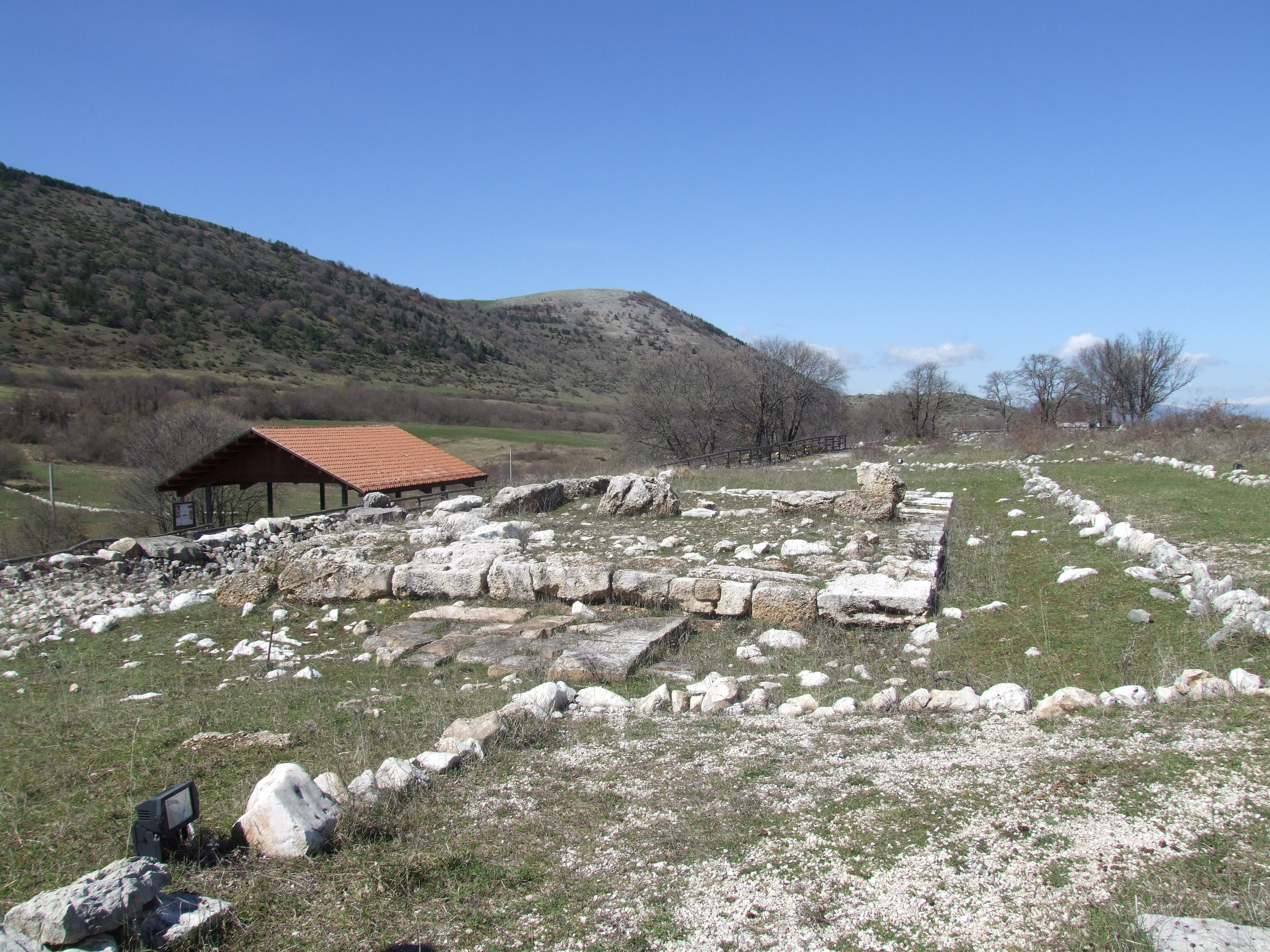
View of the remains of the Italic and Roman town of Ocriticum

Sights include:

- the Natural Archaeological Park of the Italic and Roman town of Ocriticum, with remains of two Italic/Roman temples of Jupiter and Hercules, and a sacellum of Ceres and Venus, as well as remains of the ancient settlement;
- the medieval castle, of which it is still possible to observe the structure of the tallest tower. Over the course of time, the lateral buildings of the castle have undergone numerous alterations since, no longer militarily functional since the 18th century, they have become the homes of some inhabitants of the town.
- the church of San Salvatore. The first document mentioning this religious building dates back to 1183. The church suffered serious damage following the 1706 Abruzzo earthquake, and was therefore rebuilt during the 18th century. Worthy of note, from an artistic point of view, are the baptistery dating back to the 15th century which was made of polychrome marble, a wooden organ built in the 19th century and a wooden pulpit with confessional dating back to the 18th century.

== Demographics ==
Historical population

Year	Pop.	±%
1861	1,233	—
1871	1,310	+6.2%
1881	1,335	+1.9%
1901	1,438	+7.7%
1911	1,834	+27.5%
1921	1,770	−3.5%
1931	1,753	−1.0%
1936	1,658	−5.4%

Year	Pop.	±%
1951	1,556	−6.2%
1961	851	−45.3%
1971	545	−36.0%
1981	430	−21.1%
1991	357	−17.0%
2001	270	−24.4%
2011	282	+4.4%
2021	205	−27.3%

Istat historical data 1861–2011

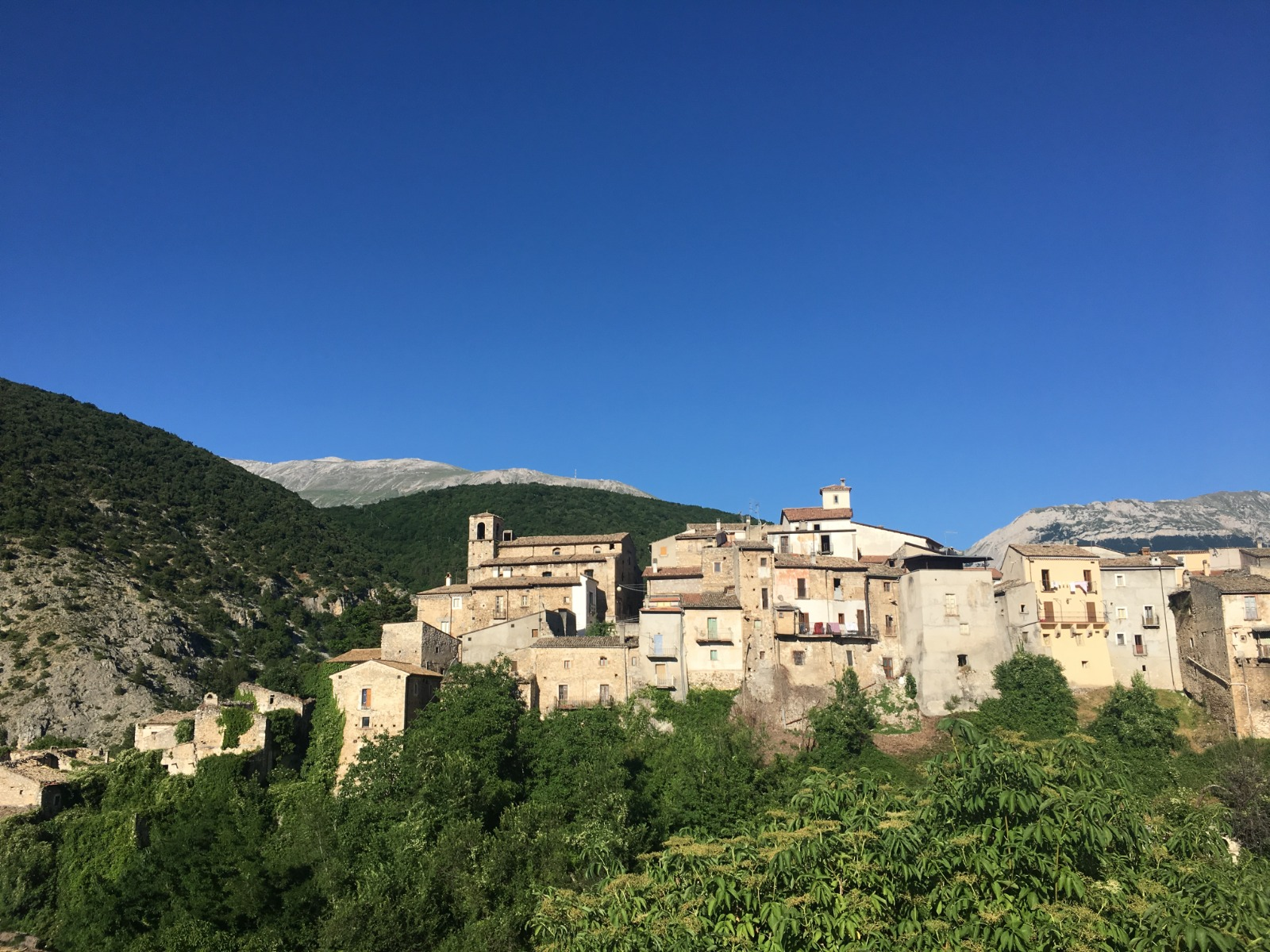
View of Cansano

The demographic history of Cansano is one of the most striking examples of the Italian diaspora, given that its population, starting from the first post-war period, went from just over 1,500 people to the 282 registered in 2014. The emigrants from Cansano mainly went to Canada, the United States, South America and, to a lesser extent, to Australia, New Zealand and Northern Europe. The most common surnames in Cansano are, in descending order of diffusion, Ruscitti, De Santis, Di Paolo, Di Silvio and Di Cesare.

== Culture ==
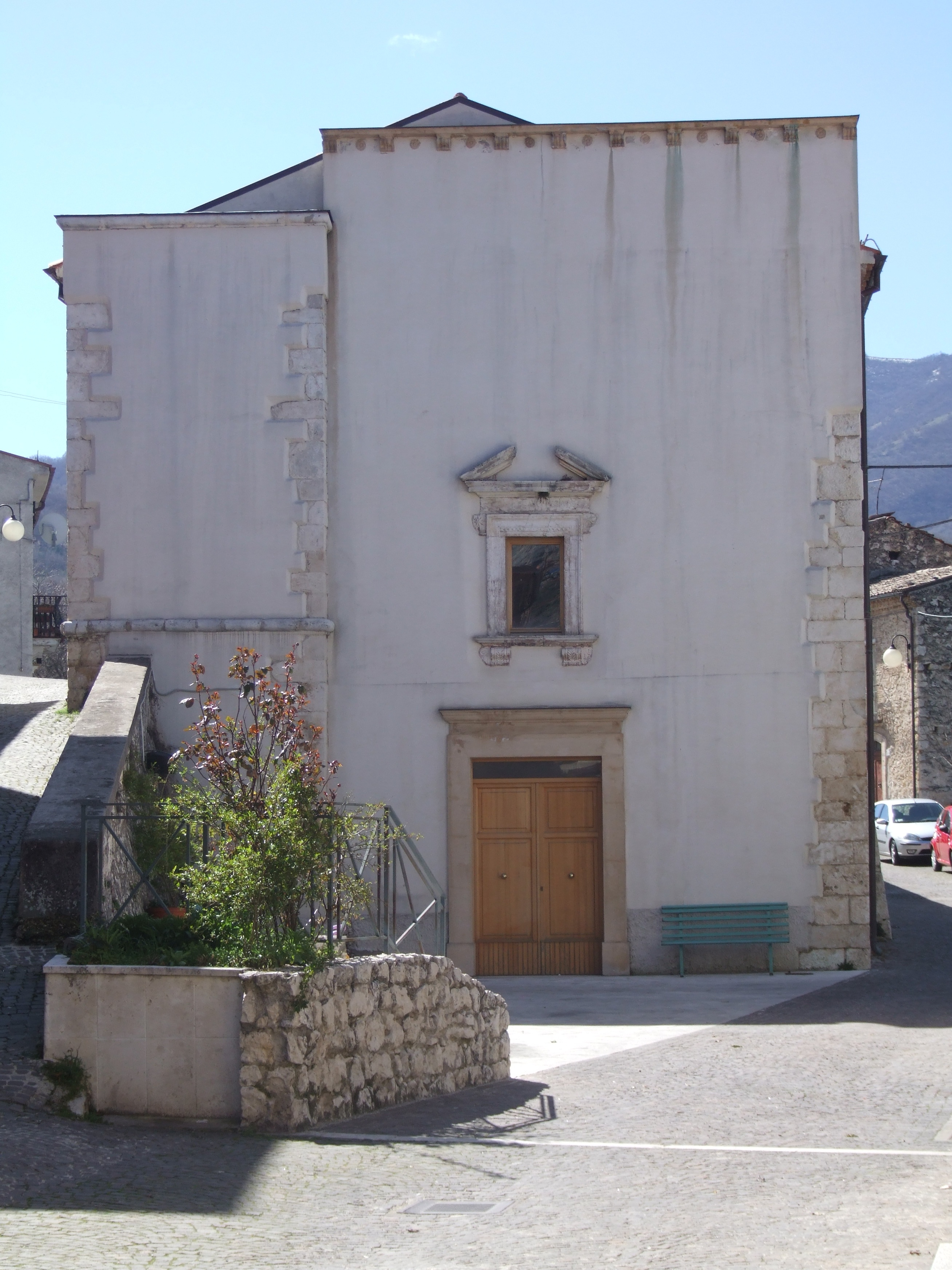
The Ocriticum documentation center, which also contains a permanent exhibition on the emigration of the inhabitants from Cansano

=== Museums ===
In Piazza XX Settembre there is the Ocriticum documentation center, inaugurated in 2004, which also contains a permanent exhibition on the emigration of the inhabitants from Cansano, as well as ex-voto objects found in the Ocriticum archaeological park.

=== Cuisine ===
The cuisine of Cansano makes use of local agricultural and livestock products, such as various legumes, lamb and goat meat, pecorino cheese, smoked prosciutto and goat ricotta, and the surrounding area, such as mushrooms, mercury goosefoot and truffles. As for legumes, chickpeas are used as a condiment in pasta or pastora soup; other first courses are gnocchi with mutton ragout, maccheroni alla chitarra, spienaturo polenta, cooked in winter, and ravioli with ricotta. The wild vegetables of the area are used as an ingredient in recipes such as pizza and fuij, and pancotto. Among the desserts, there are sweet pizza and pizzelle.

== Transportation ==
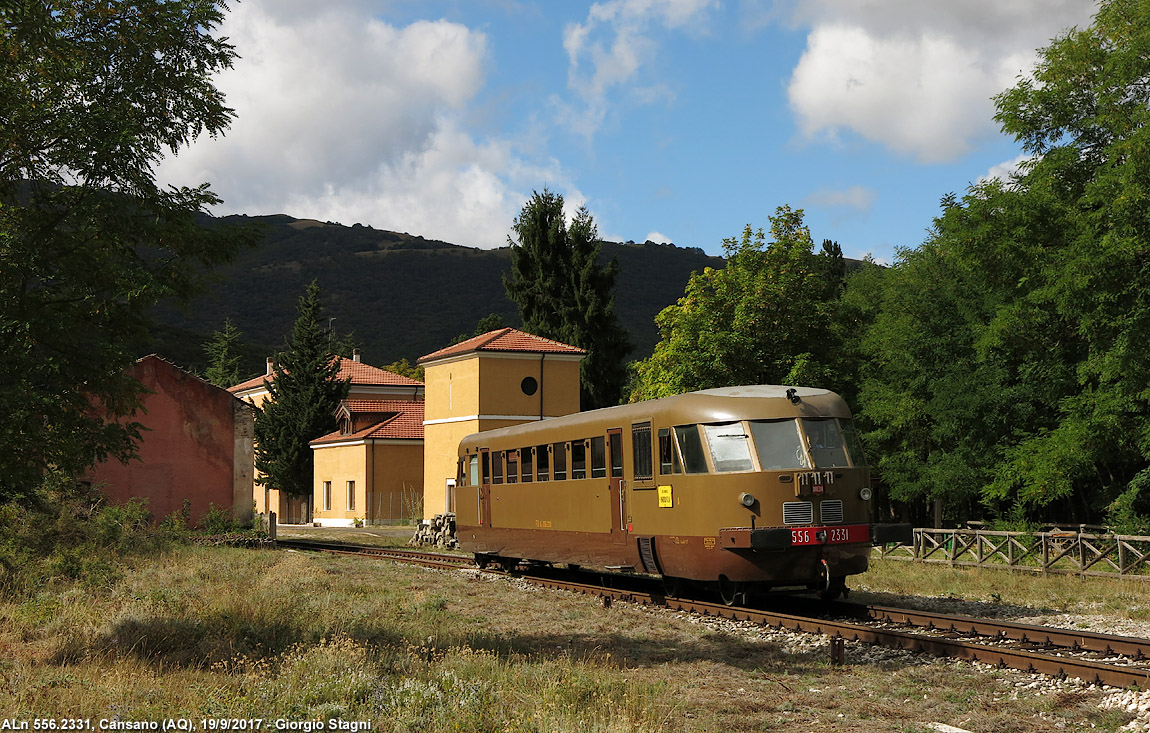
Cansano railway station

The Cansano railway station is located along the Sulmona-Isernia railway, currently in use only as a heritage railway. In the past, the line guaranteed regular connections with Sulmona, Isernia, L'Aquila, Rome, Pescara and Naples, but the ordinary service was suspended on 11 December 2011.

The reopening as a heritage railway took place on 17 May 2014, but the Cansano station, suppressed in December 2002, had to wait until 16 July 2017 for its restoration. Along the same line, as of 2023, a second railway station is under construction in the municipal area of Cansano, the Ocriticum station, serving the Ocriticum archaeological park.

== Sport ==
The only sports association present is the "ASD Majella United" football team, which played in regional amateur championships, born in 2018 from the merger of the previous company "ASD Cansano" with that of "ASD Campo di Giove", from the town of the same name on the slopes of the Maiella bordering Cansano.

== See also ==
- Maiella National Park
- Ocriticum
