= Castello Caldora =

Castle in Pacentro, Italy

Cantelmo-Caldora Castle
- Castello Cantelmo-Caldora
- Pacentro
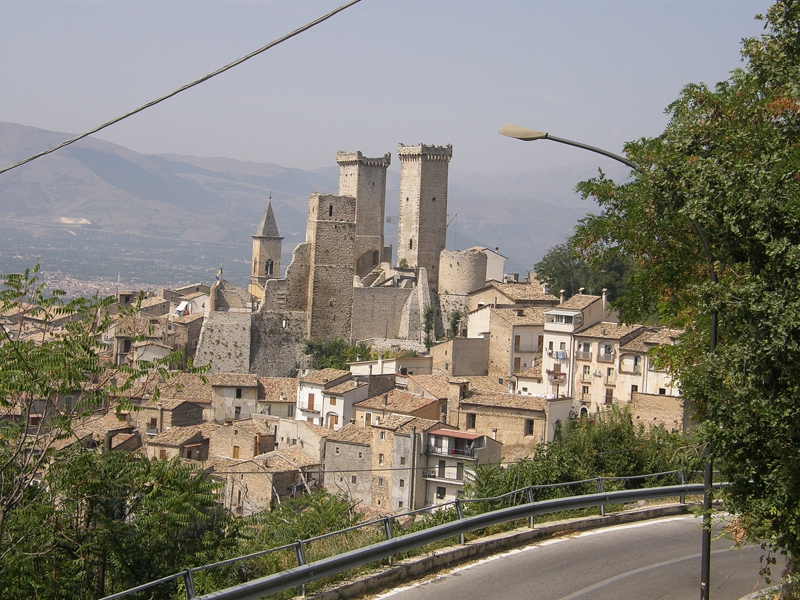
- Cantelmo-Caldora Castle in Pacentro

Site information
- Type: Castle

Location
- Coordinates: 42.051643°N 13.995472°E

Site history
- Built: 11th-14th century

Castello Cantelmo-Caldora (Italian for Cantelmo-Caldora Castle) is a Middle Ages castle in Pacentro, Province of L'Aquila (Abruzzo).

== History ==
The castle was built before the 14th-15th century, because at this time was made its first restructuring. The most common assumption is that it dates back to the 11th-13th century, that is the age of the truncated tower placed at the north-east of the castle.

A main upgrades was completed in the second half of the 15th century, when the Orsini family built circular towers. Also the construction of the wall with a trapezoidal base is dated back to this period.

== Architecture ==
The base of the castle is with a trapezoidal shape. In the corners there are towers with a squared base: as of today, only three of them are still in place. There are also three circular bastions. The 17th century facade of the castle gives on a square where is placed also the church of Saint Mary Major.
