= Hermitage of San Germano =

Coordinates: 42.0356°N 14.0357°E

- Eremo di San Germano
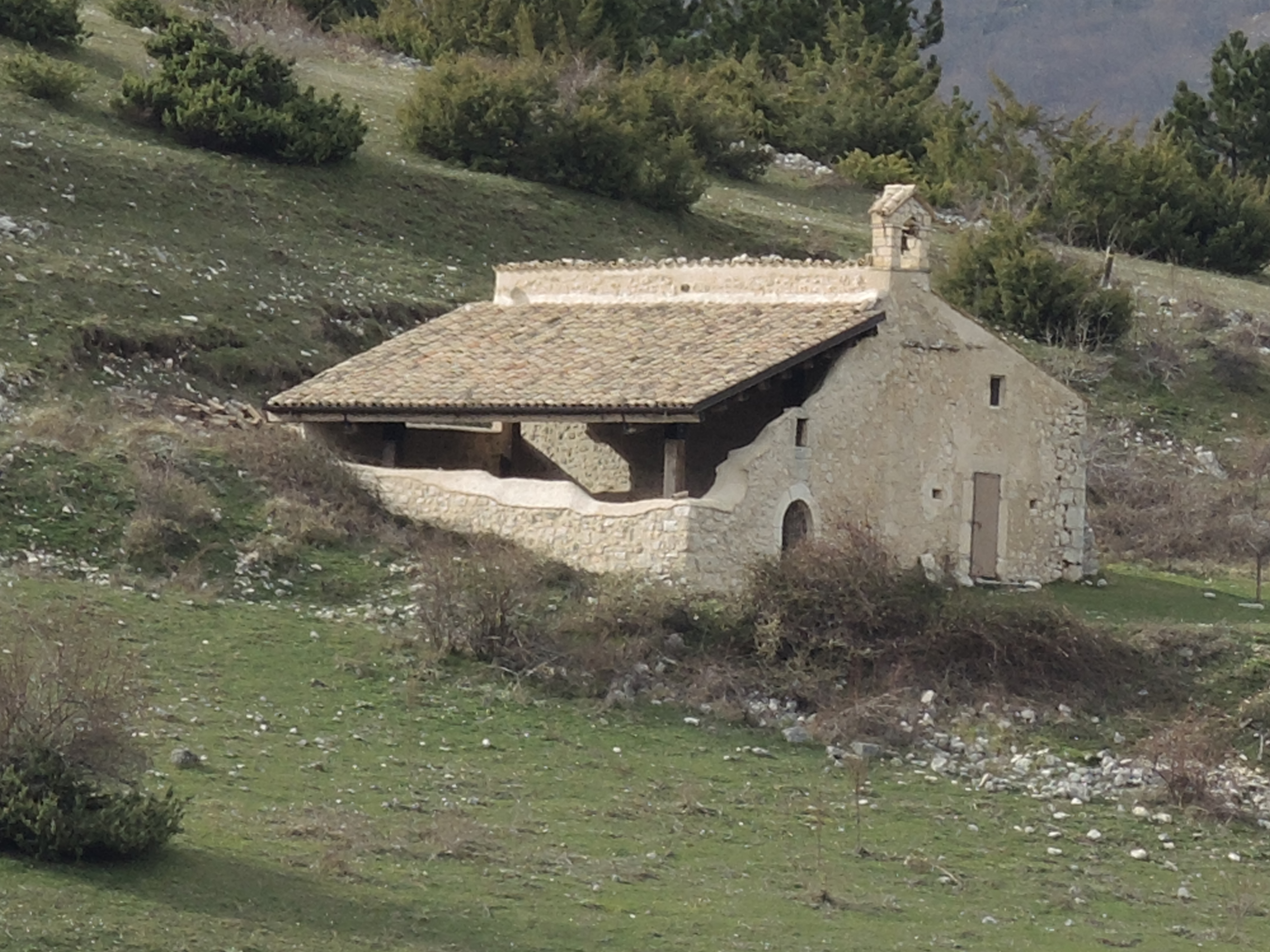
- View of the hermitage

- Location within Abruzzo

Religion
- Affiliation: Roman Catholic
- Province: Province of L'Aquila
- Region: Abruzzo

Location
- Municipality: Pacentro
- State: Italy
- Interactive map of Hermitage of San Germano

Architecture
- Groundbreaking: 1428

Eremo di San Germano (Italian for Hermitage of San Germano) is an hermitage located in Pacentro, Province of L'Aquila (Abruzzo, Italy).

== History ==
The hermitage consists of two structures built in different periods: on the right, there is a chapel, while on the left, there is a residential building. The chapel dates back to 1428, as evidenced by the date engraved on the architrave of the portal. The residential structure is later; based on the style of the entrance portal, it likely dates to the 18th or 19th century.

== Architecture ==
The main facade features the chapel on the right, with its rectangular entrance door, and the residential area on the left, with an arched entrance portal. Almost in the center of the facade is a bell gable.

The chapel has a rectangular plan and is covered by a barrel vault, of which a portion remains above the marble altar. Above the altar is a shrine with the bust of Saint Germano, bishop. On the northeast exterior corner of the church, there are buttresses, presumably added to reinforce the structure after the Maiella earthquake of 1706.

The residential area is partially collapsed, and a wooden covering has been recently constructed to protect the structure. It was presumably used as a shelter for shepherds during transhumance.
