= Hermitage of Madonna di Coccia =

Coordinates: 42.0004°N 14.0792°E

- Eremo della Madonna di Coccia
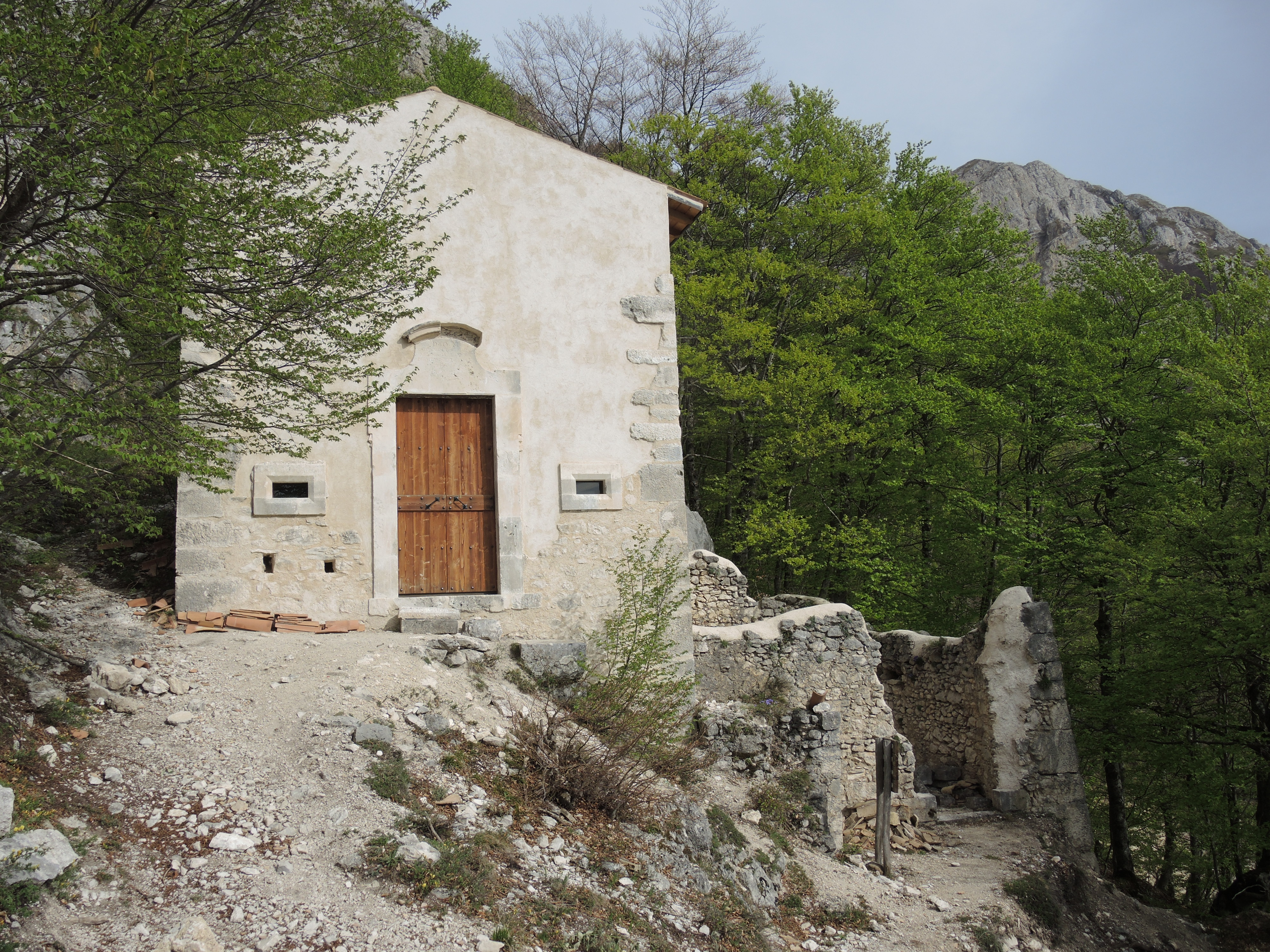
- View of the hermitage

- Location within Abruzzo

Religion
- Affiliation: Roman Catholic
- Province: Province of L'Aquila
- Region: Abruzzo

Location
- Municipality: Campo di Giove
- State: Italy
- Interactive map of Hermitage of Madonna di Coccia

Eremo della Madonna di Coccia (Italian for Hermitage of Madonna di Coccia) is an hermitage located in Campo di Giove, Province of L'Aquila (Abruzzo, Italy).

== History ==
The hermitage is located along the mule track connecting Campo di Giove with Palena, passing through the Guado di Coccia pass. It serves as an example of a church-mountain hut-shepherd's hut. There is limited historical information on the hermitage, but it is believed to have been commissioned by the future Pope Celestine V in the 13th century. The only certain date is that inscribed on the architrave of the 1748 restoration, likely after damage from the 1706 Abruzzo earthquake. More recent accounts link the path to the escape of prisoners from the internment camp of Sulmona, heading to the pass to cross the Gustav Line. Related to these events, a memorial dedicated to Ettore De Corti, who was killed by the Germans while attempting to cross the front line, stands at the pass. In 2009, the church underwent restoration work carried out by the management body of the Maiella National Park.

== Architecture ==
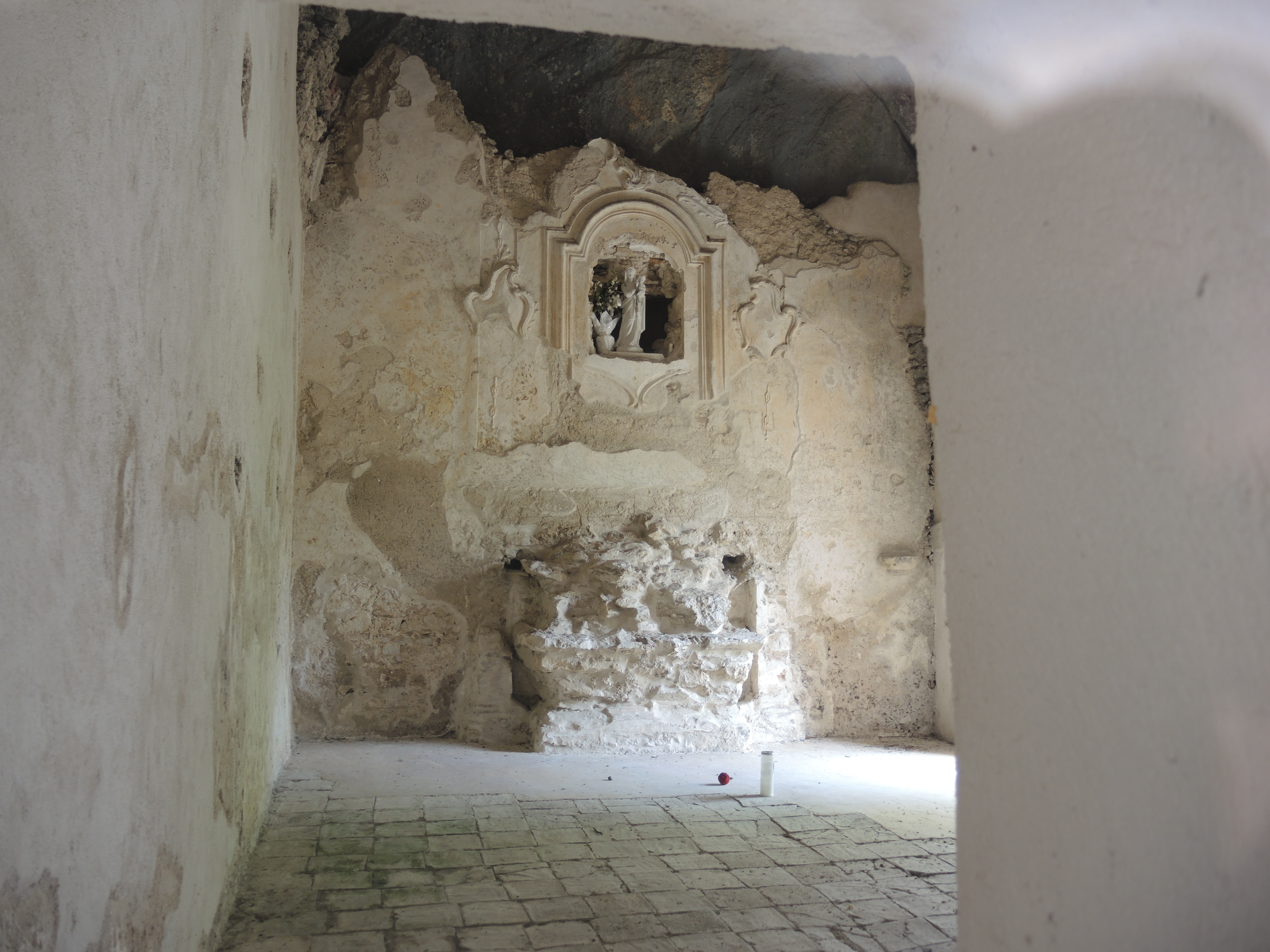
Interior of the church. The remains of the altar with the bas-relief of the Madonna and Child are clearly visible on the back wall.

The entire structure consists of two sections built against a rock on a steep slope: the church is at the top, and below are the remains of a residential area. The church is rectangular and has two windows and a large entrance door on the facade. The lunette-shaped architrave above the door bears the inscription commemorating the restoration:

D. O. M.
Ad onorem B. V. Maria
Michele Vella p. [pro] sua
divotione restauravit
A. D. 1748.
To God, the best and greatest.
To the honor of the Blessed Virgin Mary
Michele Vella, for his
devotion, restored
in the year of Our Lord 1748.

Above the windows is the inscription:

Refugium peccatorum
consolatrix aflictorum
Refuge of sinners
comforter of the afflicted

The interior of the church is bare. On the back wall, above the remains of the altar, are the decorations and frame that housed a bas-relief of the Madonna and Child.

The residential area next to the church was organized on two floors. It is in a state of ruin, but the perimeter walls remain. The first floor had two windowless rooms used as a stable or woodshed, while the upper floor, paved with terracotta tiles, was used as a dormitory.
