= Ocriticum =

Ancient Roman town in modern-day Cansano, Italy

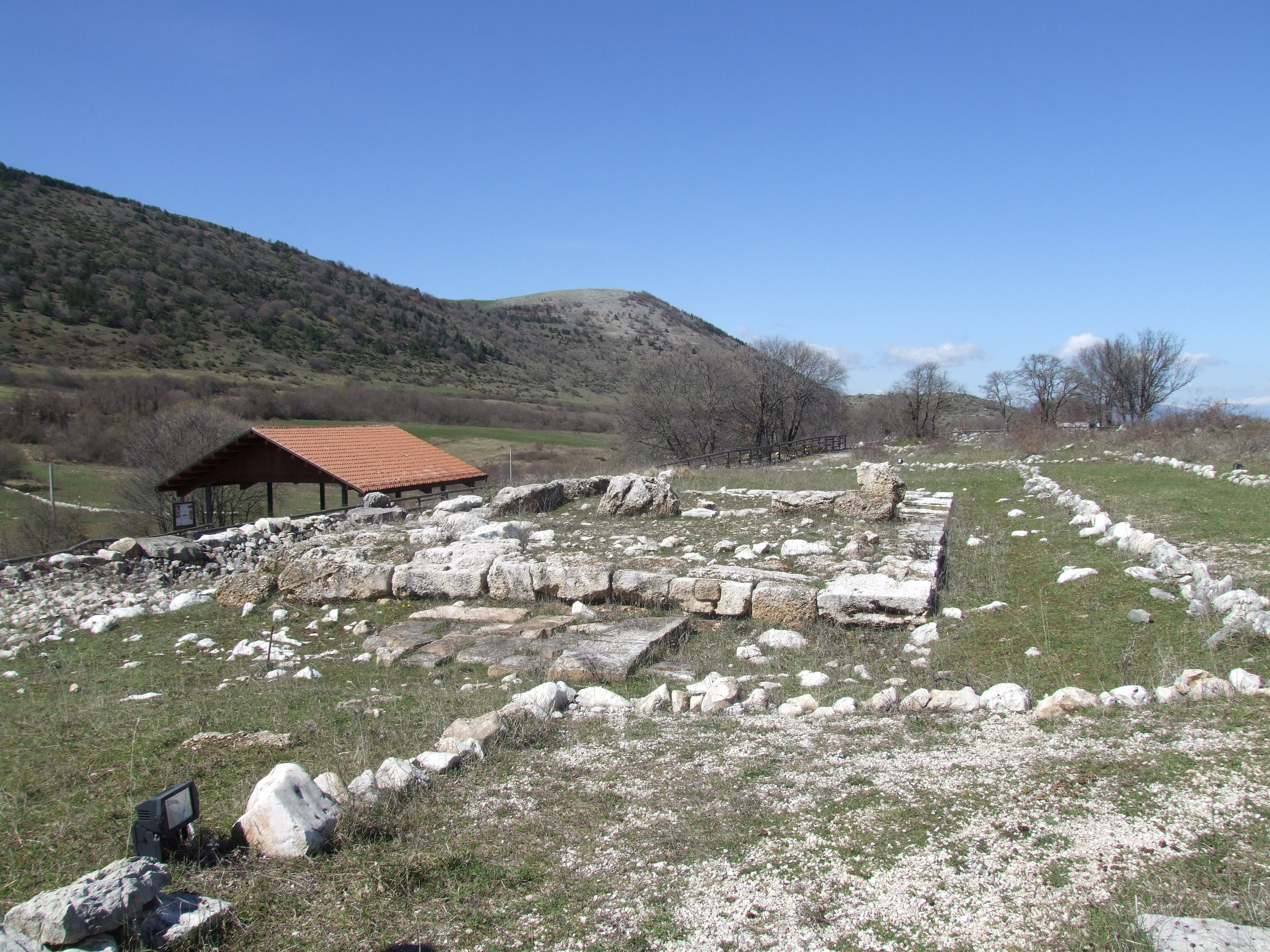
- View of Ocriticum

- Location within Abruzzo
- 42.002986°N 13.990211°E
- Cultures: Ancient Rome
- Location: Cansano

Ocriticum was an Italic and Roman town, the ruins of which are located in the comune of Cansano, in the province of L'Aquila in the Abruzzo region of Italy.

There are the remains of two Italic/Roman temples of Jupiter and Hercules, and a sacellum of Ceres and Venus, as well as remains of the ancient settlement.

The mansio Jovis Larene is also nearby, an important inn stop marked on the Tabula Peutingeriana.

== The sacred area ==
The presence of a large sacred area was decisive for the development of the village of Ocriticum; pilgrims, wayfarers, traders, shepherds stopped there to venerate the divinities. The fervent religious activity led to the multiplication of the cults practiced in the plateau, the monumentalisation and expansion of the sacred buildings and the increase in the fame of the place.

On the Peutingeriana Table (copy of an original Roman military road map) Ocriticum is seven miles from Sulmo and twenty-five from Aufidena on the important route that connected the Peligna Valley with the Sannio Pentro, recognized as the medieval Via Nova still partially passable and recognisable.

=== The Italic temple ===
The first temple built in the area dates to the end of the 4th century BC; originally it consisted of a single cell with an almost square base, with an entrance facing South-East (where the Sun rises) around which there was a sacred garden delimited by a perimeter wall erected dry. In a subsequent building phase, an expansion of the enclosure and of the temple building took place, which was provided with a pronaos built with a significantly different technique from the cell.

In the sacred garden, dug into the ground to the west of the building, a votive deposit was found to conserve objects which, due to lack of space, could no longer be housed inside the naos; around 600 votive offerings have been found, datable between the 4th century BC and the 1st century BC, including a bronze statuette of Hercules which lay isolated on the bottom of the deposit: to Hercules, a very widespread divinity in the Peligna area in the late Italic age and Roman, therefore it seems that the temple was dedicated, albeit, probably, not exclusively.

=== The Roman temple ===
Around the beginning of the 1st century BC (and therefore now under the dominion of the Romans), there was a further expansion of the sacred area, in which, on a terrace higher than the Italic temple but perfectly aligned with it, another temple building, larger and architecturally sophisticated. The temple, with a rectangular base and divided into two rooms of equal size (pronaos and cell), was probably a tetrastyle prostyle, with a staircase set in front of the entrance, facing south-east as in the previous temple. Only the podium in opus reticulatum remains of the original structure: no trace remains of the entire decorative apparatus, as well as of the mosaic floor of the cell, with the exception of some mosaic tiles found near the building. The cult to which the temple was intended is probably that of Jupiter, as evidenced by the funerary inscription dedicated to Sesto Paccio and the toponym, Jovis Larene, by which the area was known in ancient times.

Simultaneously with the construction of the temple of Jupiter, the extension of the sacred precinct was carried out, close to which, on the internal northern side, rooms were created for warehouses, shops and rooms for the use of the cultivators of the sanctuary. The enclosed space, thus chosen as a place of the sacred, is technically defined temenos and probably had an internal spatial organization aimed at the celebration of religious activities by the priests.

=== The chapel of the female divinities ===
In the area to the west of the temenos and the two major temples, on a lower terrace than the others, a third small temple building was found, flanked by a votive deposit and surrounded by a sacred enclosure: it is a basic sacellum square, positioned in perfect alignment with the other temples, also with an entrance to the South-East; the environment still retains part of the original floor, made of red tesserae, and the internal plastering. Inside the sacellum, probably built between the 3rd and 2nd century BC, a fair amount of typical objects are feminine, such as vitreous ampoules and balsam jars, which still retain traces of ointments, perfumes and cosmetics. This element, also in relation to the objects conserved in the storeroom (statuettes and clay votive masks) has suggested that the sacellum was dedicated to female divinities and in particular to Ceres, Venus and Proserpina, cults often linked to that of Jupiter.

=== The production area: the fornax calcaria ===
The eastern hill of the plateau reveals the intense productive and commercial activity that made Ocriticum an active centre also from an economic point of view. In fact, a via glareata branched off from the Via Nova, a mass of stones covered with crushed stone mixed with mortar which, after crossing the plateau, climbed up the eastern hill and led to a vast rectangular building divided in internal compartments of different sizes. On the eastern side the building, which rests directly on the rock, is a large cylindrical cavity dug directly into the slope: it is a fornax calcaria, a lime production plant; all the rooms of the large building (one of which still retains the original terracotta floor) must therefore have been intended for cooling, conservation, storage and finally for the sale of the lime. The organisational efficiency of the production plant is as striking as the direct involvement, through the immediate connection of the via glareata, in the commercial traffic of the Via Nova. It is interesting to highlight how the basic activity for the economy of the town of Cansano was for a long time and at least until the last century, the production of lime, according to a less sophisticated system but not dissimilar from that adopted by the inhabitants of Ocriticum: the limestone. Along the via glareata, near the fornax calcaria, the base of a monumental sepulchre was found, probably a mausoleum of the "dado" or "ara" type.
