= Pacentro =

- Comune
- Comune di Pacentro
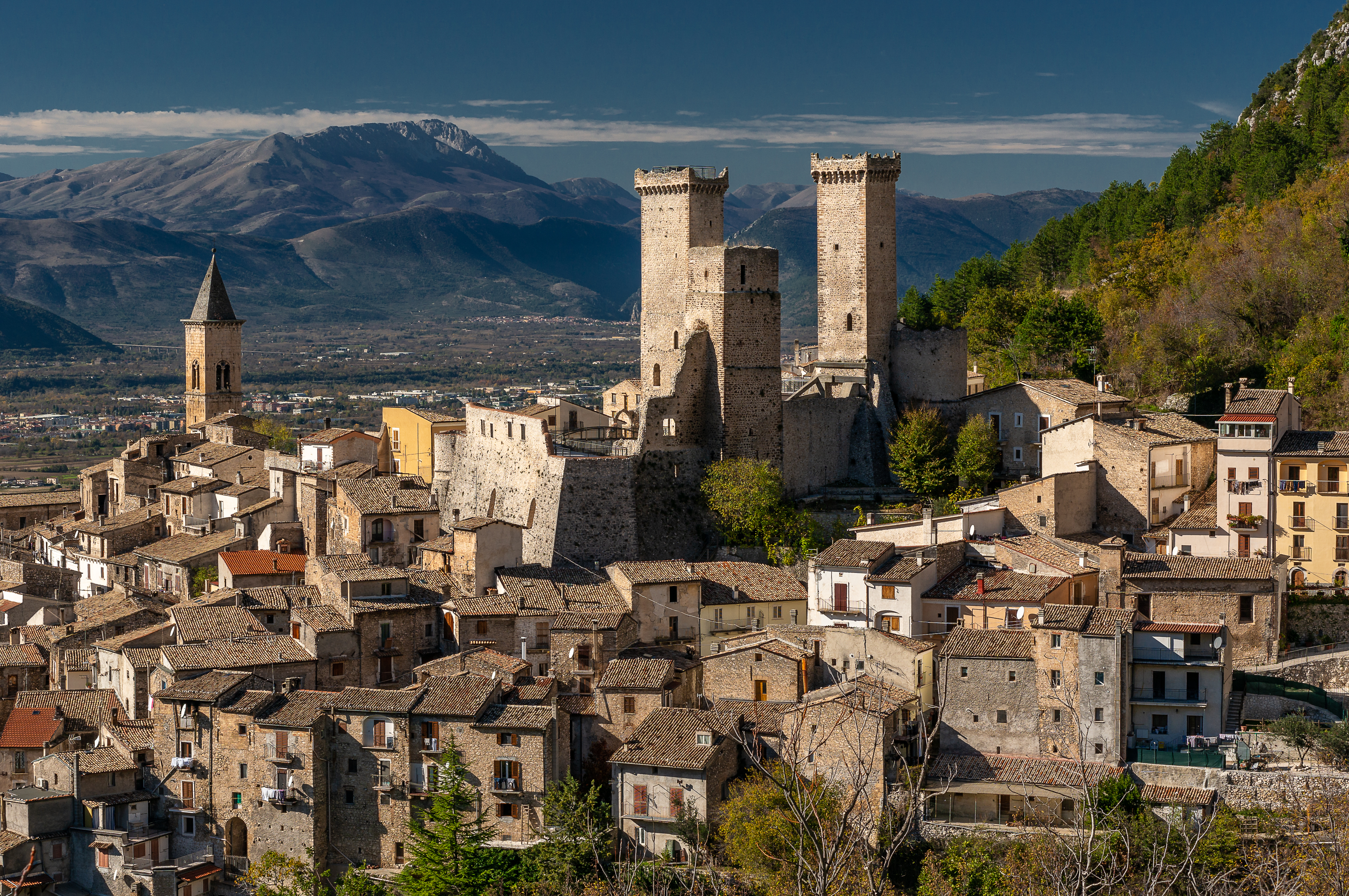

- Location within Italy Location within Abruzzo
- Coordinates: 42°03′N 14°03′E
- Country: Italy
- Region: Abruzzo
- Province: L'Aquila (AQ)
- Frazioni: Passo San Leonardo

Government
  - Mayor: Giuseppe Silvestri

Area
  - Total: 71 km^{2} (27 sq mi)
- Elevation: 653 m (2,142 ft)

Population (January 1, 2007)
  - Total: 1,269
  - Density: 18/km^{2} (46/sq mi)
- Demonym: Pacentrani
- Time zone: UTC+1 (CET)
  - Summer (DST): UTC+2 (CEST)
- Postal code: 67030
- Dialing code: 0864
- Patron saint: San Marco, Madonna della Misericordia
- Saint day: April 25 8 May
- Website: https://www.comunepacentro.aq.it/

Pacentro is a comune of 1,279 inhabitants of the province of L'Aquila in Abruzzo, Italy. It is a well-preserved historic medieval village located in central Italy, several kilometers from the City of Sulmona about 170 kilometres (110 mi) east of Rome. It is one of I Borghi più belli d'Italia ("The most beautiful villages of Italy").

== Geography ==
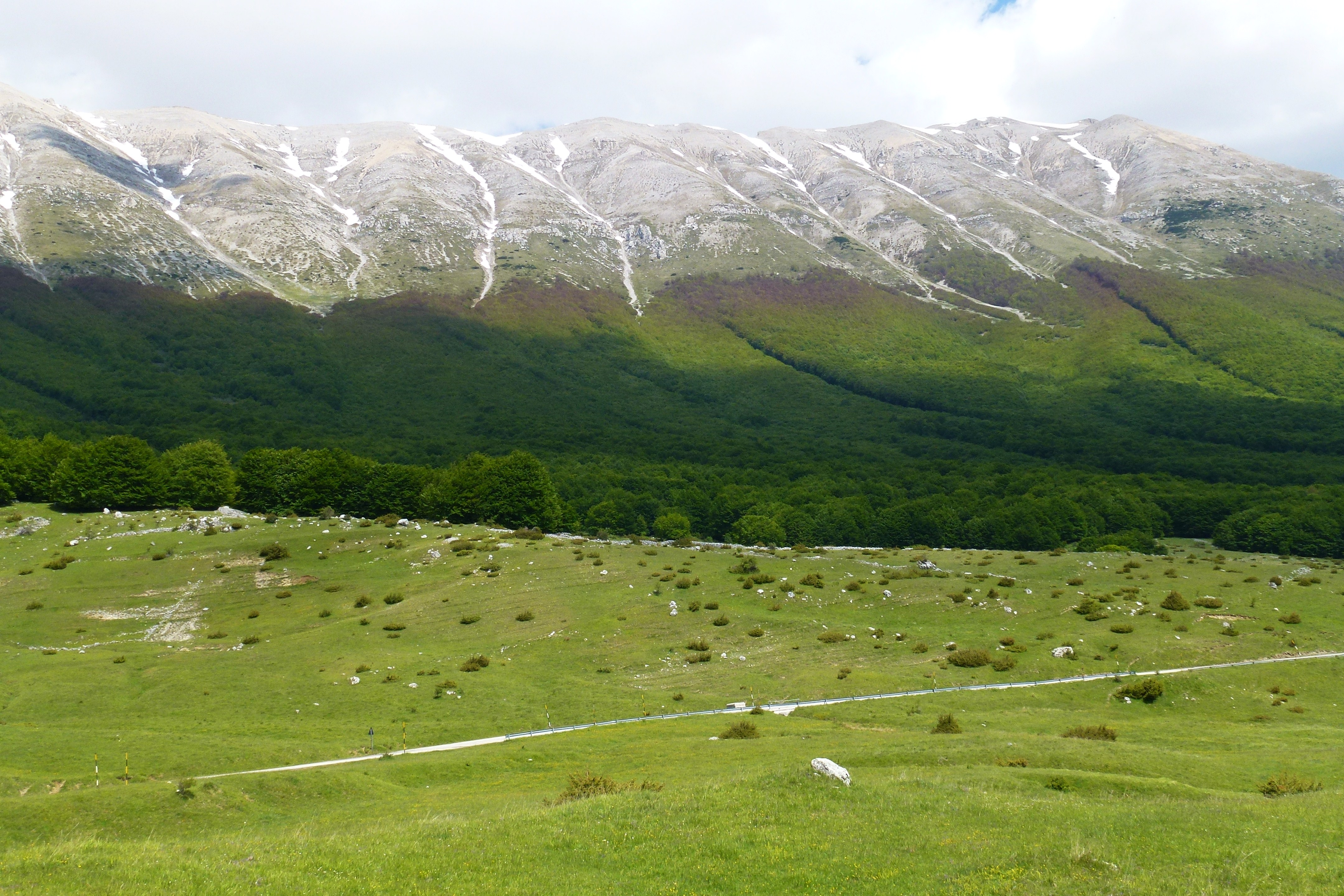
View of the Maiella massif from Pacentro

Pacentro lies in the Apennine Mountain Range on a plateau consisting of small hills 650 metres (2,133 ft) above sea level. The castle sits on one hill (Colle Castello) at one end of town and the other hill (Colle San Marco) is where the old Church of S. Marco used to sit. The town is just below Mount Morrone and right above the Peligna Valley (Conca Peligna) and the City of Sulmona. Pacentro is part of the Majella National Park (Parco Nazionale della Majella) and is renowned for its springs and fresh mountain water that comes from the snow of the Majella.

== History ==
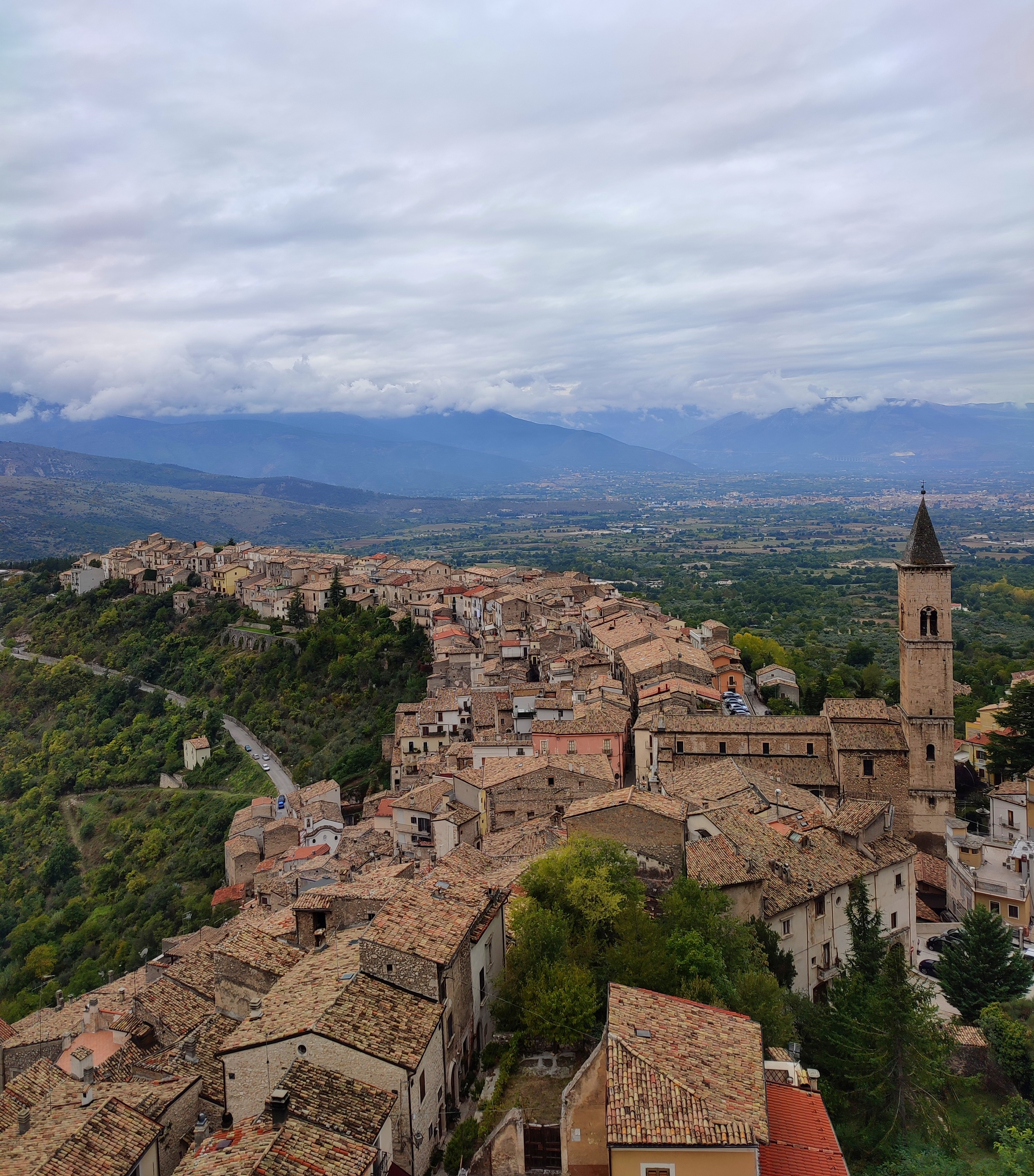
View of Pacentro

The village has documented origins back to the 8th or 9th centuries, but the area was known as a mountain retreat since Roman times.

Pacentro is one of several towns in the area with a medieval castle due to its position at the entrance of the strategic San Leonardo mountain pass to Pescara. The original castle was controlled by the Counts of Valva. There are writings of the era that mention a certain "Gualterio, son of Manerio, Count of Valva", who lived in the Castle of Pacentro in 1130. The castle in its current form dates from the 10th century and was built by the Cantelmo lords. It is partially ruined but is still preserved with three of the four towers mostly intact. The castle was sold by the Cipriani-Avolio family to the town government in 1957. It has recently been restored and can be visited as a tourist attraction (limited times). Another resident of Pacentro was Pope Celestine V. This pope, originally known as Pietro da Morrone, was a 13th-century monk-hermit of the Benedictine order who lived in a cave in the nearby mountains and was renowned for his holiness. He was elected pope by acclamation in L'Aquila in 1294, but was the only pope to resign after a reign lasting only several months. His image can be seen on a medieval fresco in a lunette on the facade of the Church of San Marcello in Pacentro.

Through its history, the town was successively in the feudal domain of several powerful families. Jacopo Caldora and his son Antonio controlled Pacentro from the late 13th century until the defeat of the Angevin Kings of Naples in mid-15th century. The Neapolitan branch of the Orsini family took control in 1483 and as allies of the Aragonese Kings, they were wealthy enough to extensively remodel the castle and expand the town. For the brief period of 1613–1624, Capitano Barone Antonio Domenico De Sanctis ruled Pacentro. However, due to insolvency, his feudal domain was dismembered and sold off to creditors. In 1626, the Colonna family purchased the fief and added Count of Pacentro to their many titles. In 1664 Maffeo Barberini purchased Pacentro from the Colonna (the family of his mother, Anna Colonna). Maffeo's granddaughter Cornelia was the heir to the Barberini estate as the male line had died out. When she married Giulio Cesare Colonna di Sciarra in 1728, the two houses were united as the Barberini Colonna di Sciara family. By the mid-18th century, financial reasons caused the Barberini to sell the fief to marquis Francesco Recupito di Raiano, whose family lost their feudal rights with the abolition of feudalism by King Joseph Bonaparte in 1806. The local nobility and gentry often controlled most local affairs while their masters generally remained in Rome, Naples or L'Aquila. An example of this is the 17th-century nobleman, Orazio Rossi, who was Luogotenente (or Lieutenant) of the Marchese Recupito di Raiano. Pacentro was also united politically with the nearby towns of Cansano and Campo di Giove for much of the 18th and early 19th century due to their common ownership by the same Feudal Lord.

=== 20th-century history ===
The town reached its peak of growth and prosperity just prior to World War I. In World War II this area of Abruzzo was directly affected by some of the most intense warfare of the Italian Campaign. On the other side of the peaks of the Majella from Pacentro, was the German Gustav Line. Many of the towns near the German defenses were bombed or destroyed, but Pacentro's geographic position of being tucked into a mountain pass preserved it from aerial bombardment.

After the Italian Government's surrender in September 1943, Nazi armies marched south to occupy most of Italy. The German Wehrmacht occupied the town for the next several months. Allied raids induced the Germans to evacuate the population of the whole town just before Christmas 1943. Thousands of the town's inhabitants were evicted from their homes and forced to endure significant hardships and deportations. The only major structural loss from the war was the destruction of the historic Mulino or town mill by the retreating German troops. When the Pacentrani returned however, they found their crops ruined, animals slaughtered and personal property stolen. Pacentro was finally liberated by British Troops and Italian partisans on June 9, 1944. After the war, many of the men had to emigrate to other parts of Italy, the United States, South America or Australia to find work. This eventually led to the severe depopulation of the town by the 1970s.

=== Historical demographics and socioeconomics ===
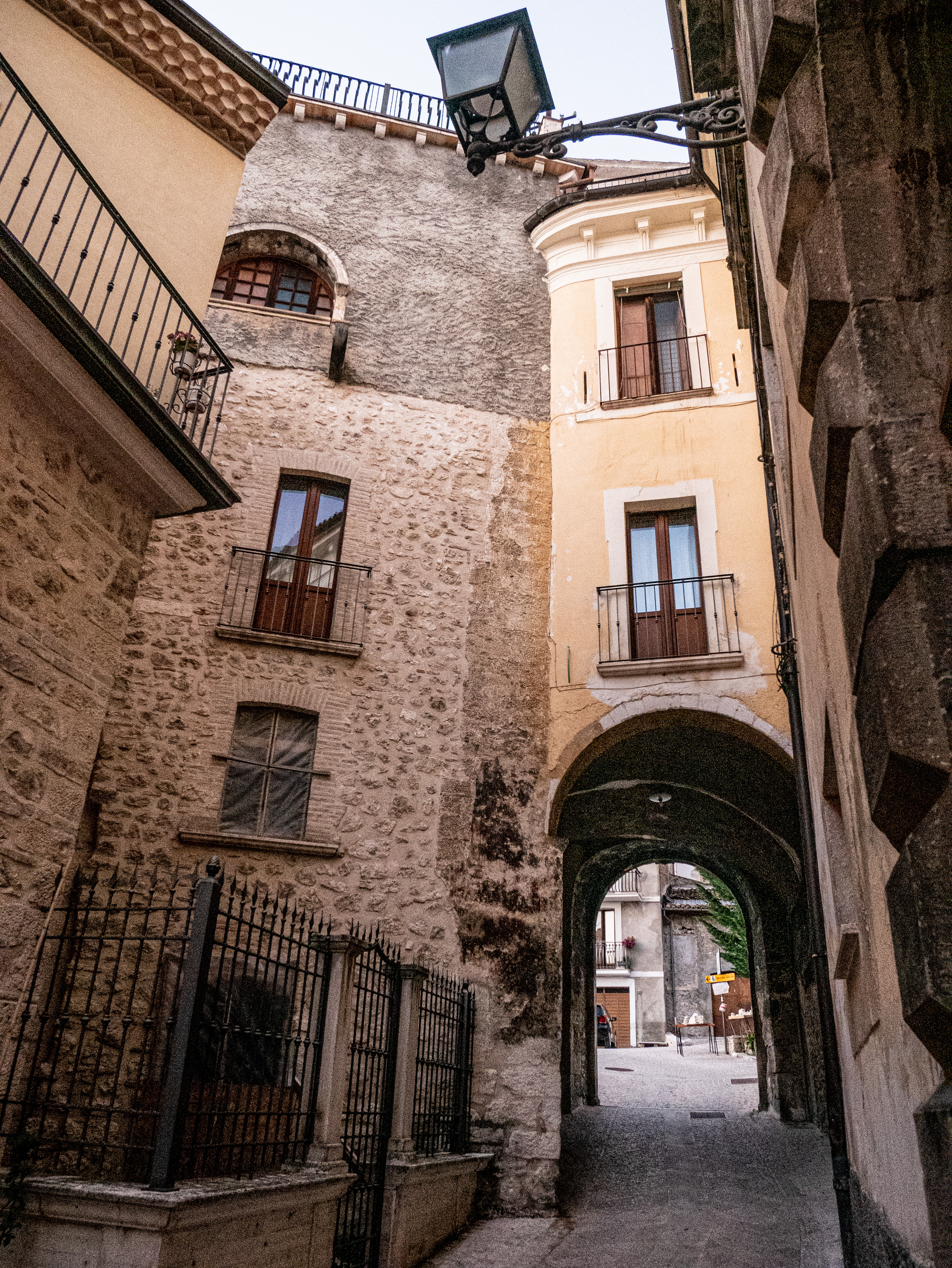
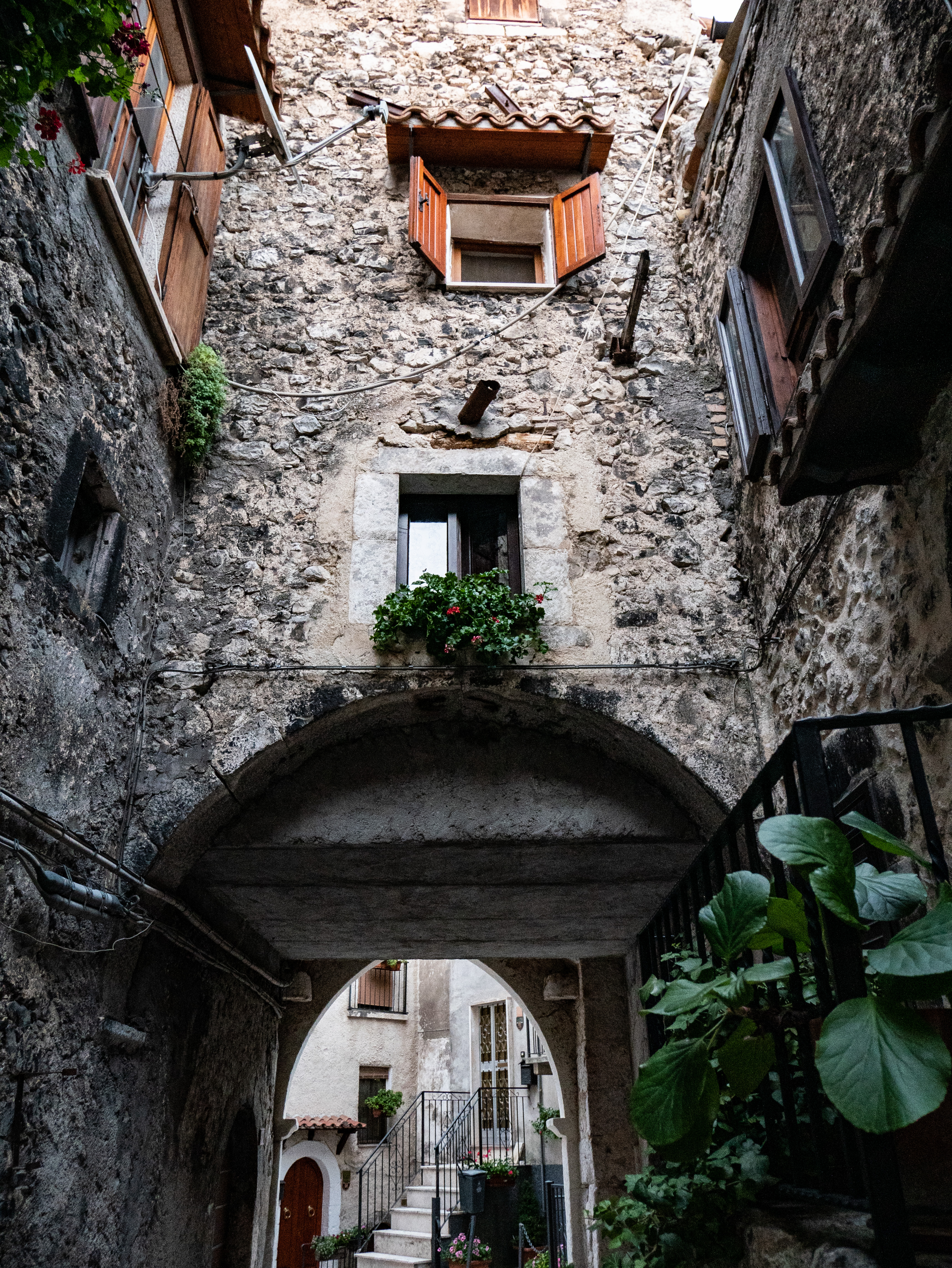
Streets in Pacentro

According to the 1753 Catasto Onciario (or Tax Census), 10% of Pacentro's population consisted of the aristocrats, gentlemen land owners and wealthy professionals (doctors, lawyers, notaries, pharmacists, priests, merchants, architects/master builders, etc.). The artisan class composed about 15% of the population. Pacentro was known for its fine craftsmen and artisans. At its peak of prosperity, Pacentro was home to fine silk weavers, stonemasons, cabinetmakers, carpenters, shoemakers, tailors, metal smiths, potters, artists and other craftsmen. These top two classes were for the most part literate, property owning and politically/socially active. The camerlengo and sindaci were the officials that ran the day-to-day operations of the town and were mostly upper or middle class in origin.

The vocation of the bulk of the population, close to 75%, was agricultural. There were three classes of agricultural worker. The first were the free landowners. They owned and farmed their own property and were not tied to the estate of a lord or landowner. The second were those involved in specialty agriculture like animal husbandry. Some of this group actually marketed their skill to breed and maintain the livestock of the landowners. The third and largest group were the ordinary peasants or serfs. Serfdom was abolished by King Joseph Bonaparte in 1806, but the lot of the peasants didn't improve much afterward. These peasant farmers were mostly sharecroppers who lived a "hand-to mouth" subsistence lifestyle.

Typically there was not much social mobility. It was possible, however, over several generations for a family to slowly move up the social ladder. For example, A wealthy merchant or artisan could sometimes attract a wife from an impoverished but aristocratic family. This would bring the merchant/artisan social standing and bring his wife and her family needed finances. The wealthier the family, the greater the odds that they would marry their children off to wealthy families from neighboring towns. This would increase the family influence beyond that of the local village or town. On the lower end of the social spectrum, occasionally a free farmer with a sufficient dowry for his daughter could attract an artisan to marry her. This kind of strategic marriage could sometimes be used to accomplish social mobility in as little as 2–3 generations. Sometimes the opposite occurred and families would move down the social ladder due to disgrace or financial calamity. In general though, families married within and stayed within their social class for hundreds of years.

== Main sights ==
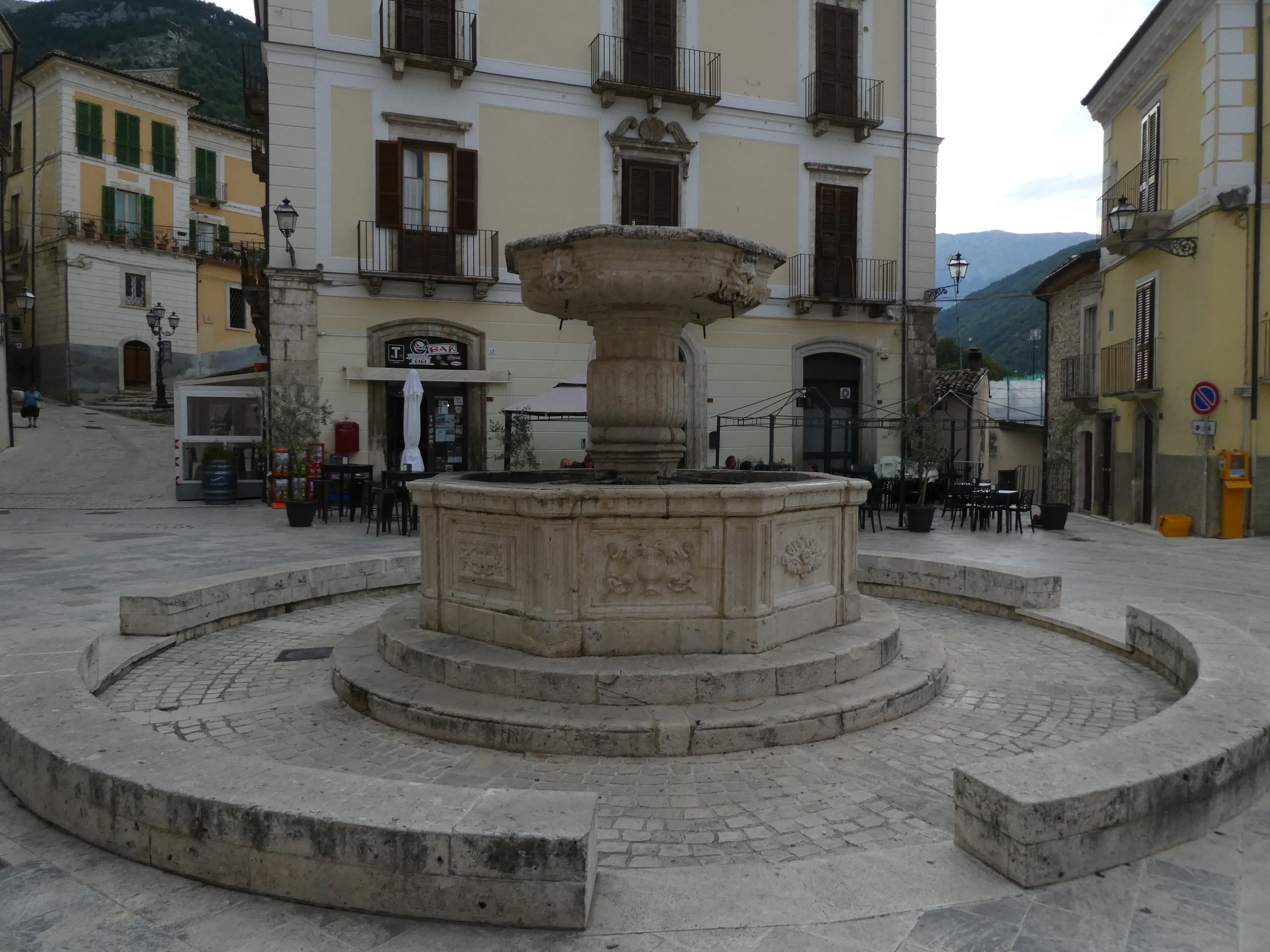
Piazza del Popolo

The most ancient part of the town is the area in the vicinity of the Castle. The town then expanded to the area of the Piazza del Popolo which was originally named Piazza Botteghe (a bottega is a shop or stand) since it was the market square. The medieval town walls ended at what is today the Piazza Umberto I or historically known as Piazza Jaringhi. The name Jaringhi or Arringhi was derived from a Germanic Lombard word meaning assembly (or meeting ring) because this is where the Lombard lords would convene just outside the walls for tribal assemblies. During the Renaissance era, the Piazza Jaringhi was surrounded by a fountain and grand new noble residences. Connecting the two main piazzas is the Via S. Maria Maggiore (also known as Vico Dritto), a straight and narrow road which is wide enough only for pedestrian traffic.

As the town grew in the 18th and 19th centuries, the town expanded beyond Piazza Jaringhi and up the Via San Marco leading to the old Church of San Marco (demolished in the early 20th century) and down the Via San Francesco (or Via Convento) leading to the old Franciscan Convento (or Monastery) of SS. Concezione. In the early 19th century, for sanitary reasons, the town cemetery was moved away from the crypt under the main church in the center of town to a site outside of town near the Convent where it remains today. The cemetery contains two main chapels (a third is currently under construction) operated by two of the town's confraternities: SS. Rosario and S. Carlo Borromeo. In addition, there are several independent family chapel/mausoleums.

=== Churches ===
==== Chiesa Madre – Santa Maria della Misericordia ====
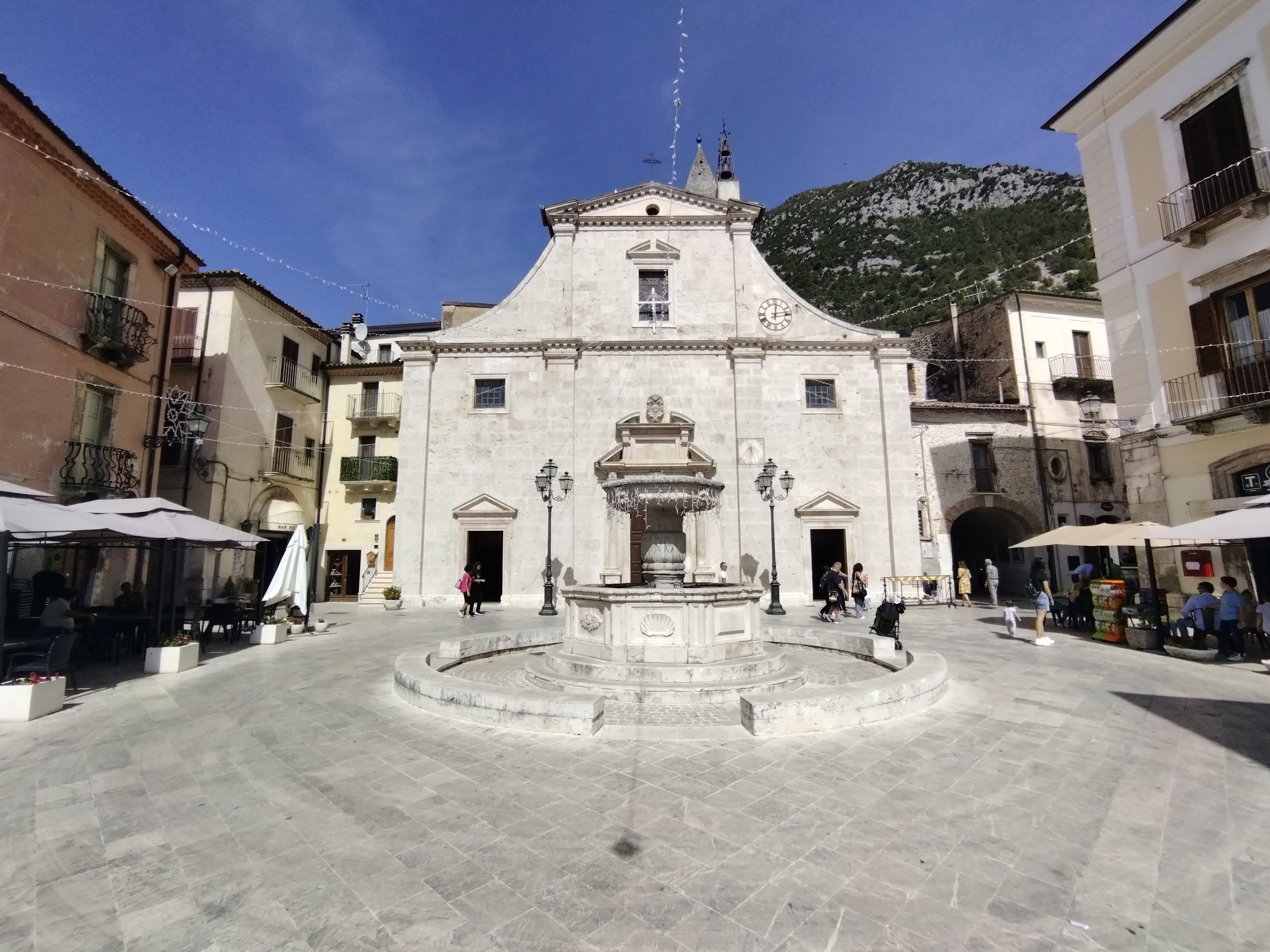
Church of Santa Maria della Misericordia

Located on the Piazza del Popolo, the main church (or Chiesa Madre) of Santa Maria della Misericordia (Our Lady of Mercy) was completed in 1603 and contains great works of religious art, statuary, and stucco. The church has the second tallest bell tower in the area after the SS. Annunziata in Sulmona and is visible for miles. The facade of the church is designed in a sedate style typical of late-16th-century Architecture known as Mannerism. This is evidenced by a Classical triangular pediment over the central part of the facade and the side doors. The portal over the main door resembles the Renaissance style of the portals of Churches and Palaces in Rome from the mid-16th century. The original 17th-century main door, which was beautifully carved in wood by a local artisan, has been moved indoors for conservation and replaced by plain wooden doors. There is a restoration project underway to clean the facade of the church which has become stained and darkened with time.

The Chiesa Madre is the sanctuary of the relics of San Crescenzo, a Roman Legionary who converted to Christianity. These relics were brought from the Roman Catacomb of Priscilla to Pacentro in 1753 at the behest of the Barberini family. The relics were originally placed in a crypt beneath the sanctuary, but now reside in shrine built into the main altar. Still in the crypt are the tombs of local noblemen such as the aforementioned Don Orazio Rossi who died in 1623, Principe Ottavio Orsini, who died in 1562 and members of the noble Lozzi family.

The interior of the church consists of a three aisled nave with grand Tuscan style octagonal columns. The ceiling of the side aisles and crossing are groin vaulted but the main aisle has a flat ceiling reminiscent of a classical Roman Basilica. The ceilings and upper walls of the church are covered in fine baroque stucco ornamentation and statuary. There is also an attractive baroque pulpit and confessionals in the nave, carved from solid walnut. There are also several side altars in the aisles commissioned by the local nobility and religious confraternities.

==== Convent Church and other churches ====
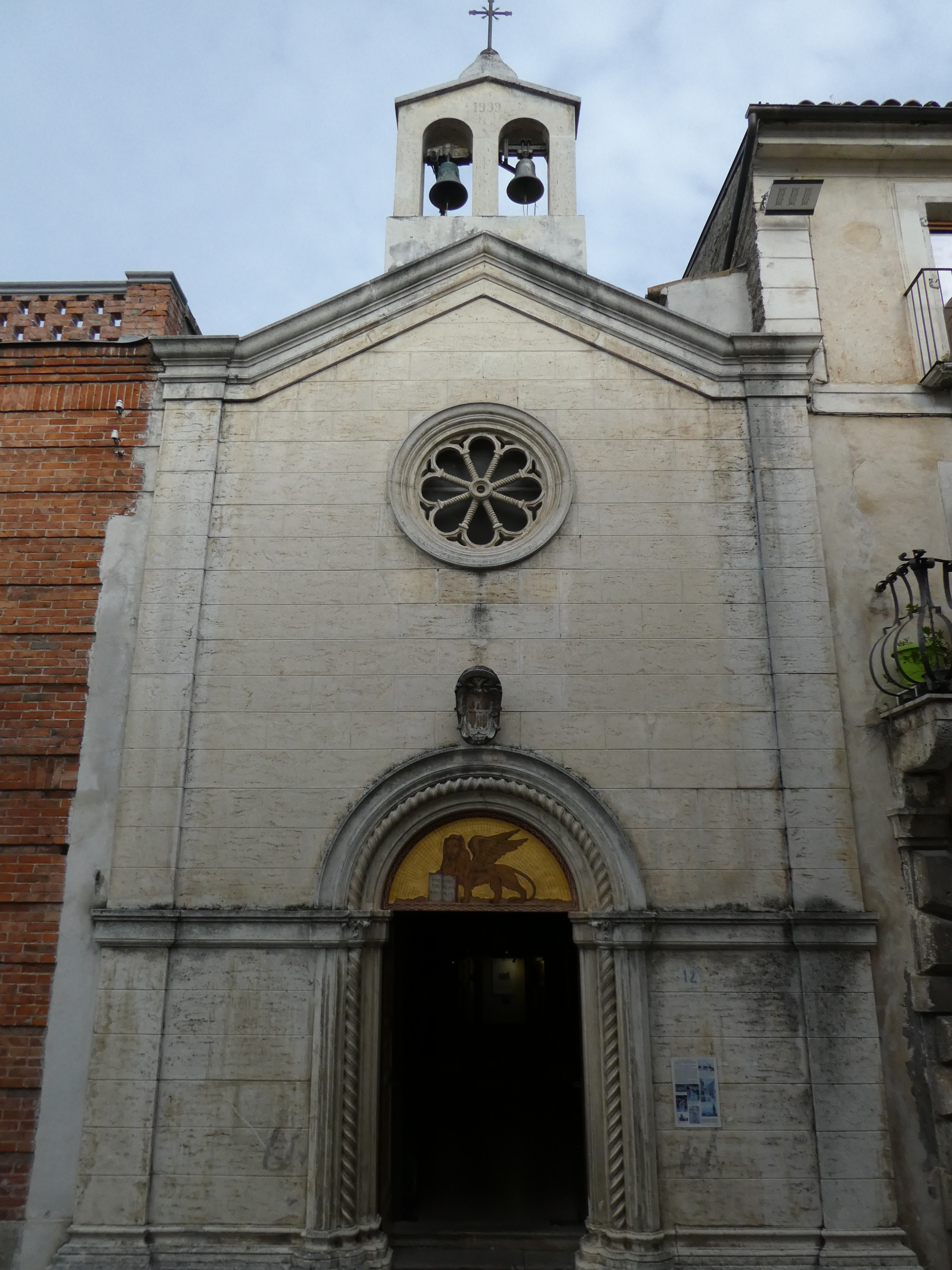
Church of San Marco

There are several other smaller churches of note in the town. The oldest of these is the 12th-century San Marcello, which is believed to be one of the original churches of the fortified castle village. San Marcello is currently the seat of the Confraternity of San Carlo Borromeo.

The 18th-century Baroque church of Madonna di Loreto was built on the site of an older church which was destroyed in the great Abruzzese earthquake of 1706. This older church was believed to be a part of a Hostel (or Ospedale) of the Knights Templar for pilgrims on their way to Brindisi and the Holy Land. The historic name for the Via Madonna di Loreto was Via Ospedale. Above the rear entrance of the church is an inscription of the phrase from the Book of Genesis 28:17, Terribilis est locus iste ("How awesome is this place"). This phrase was commonly used in Templar churches and lore. This church is also the focus of the Festa of the Madonna di Loreto in September which features the Corsa degli Zingari foot race.

On Piazza Umberto I (or Piazza Jaringhi) is the Chiesa di San Marco Evangelista (Church of St. Mark the Evangelist). Originally this chapel or small church was known as the chapel of the Madonna dei Sette Dolori (Our Lady of the Seven Sorrows). It served as the family chapel of the powerful Rossi family, one branch of which occupied the adjacent palace, the Palazzo Pitassi-Rossi. This chapel also used to be the home of a rare 14th-century painted wooden statue of the Madonna and Child that belonged to the Pitassi-Rossi Family. Since 1924, this statue has been in the collection of the Palazzo Venezia in Rome. With the destruction of the original 16th Church of San Marco in the early 20th century, the chapel was expanded, rededicated, and now serves as the seat of the Confraternita' della Santa Croce. The 1930s era facade of sculpted stone consists of a miniature rose window, a portal crowned by the Rossi coat-of-arms and a mosaic of St. Mark's Lion with the words Pax Tibi Marce Evangelista Meus (Peace be to you Mark my Evangelist). The church also contains the processional half-bust statue of San Marco Evangelista used on April 25 each year, and an 18th-century painting of the Madonna dei Sette Dolori in which the Rossi family coat-of-arms is depicted.

Lastly is the fine baroque 16th-century Convent Church located at the end of Via San Francesco. The Convent (a generic name for a monastic house in Italy) of SS. Concezione (Immaculate Conception) is a fairly large complex on the south end of the town that was founded by the Franciscan Order of Friars Minor in 1589. The convent consists of the church, the cloister, and the dormitory. The convent church is in the baroque style and is single aisled with a long barrel vault. Above the High Altar is a rare painting of the Immaculate Conception by the Flemish artist Bartholomeus Spranger. The choir of the church has finely carved stalls and an early-19th-century marble High Altar. Along the side walls of the nave are the side altars and crypts of the Di Lorenzo, Lucci and Granata families of Pacentro. These side altars were given to local prominent or noble citizens, who were patrons of the convent, as the family "cappella gentilizia" or noble chapel and burial crypt (In England these were known as a Chantry Chapel). Above the side altars were a collection of paintings including a particularly fine image of the crucifixion above the Di Lorenzo altar. The cloister also contains fine late-16th-, early-17th-century frescos of the life of St. Francis of Assisi. Today the dormitory part of the building has been converted to be used as a Retirement home and Youth Hostel. For more details on the churches of Pacentro see the parish website: Parrocchia di S. Maria della Misercordia

=== Town houses and palaces ===
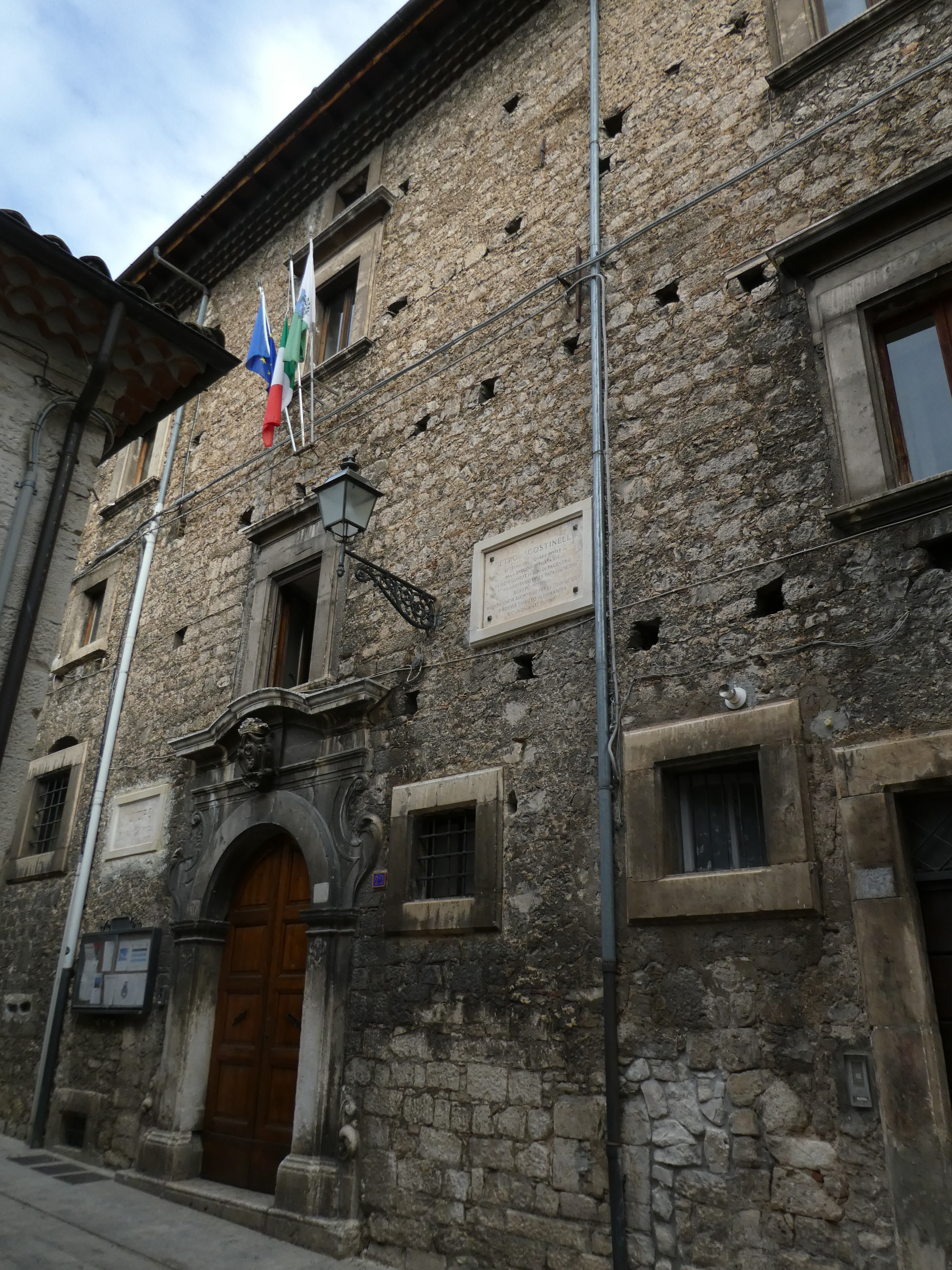
The City Hall of Pacentro

The town also contains numerous 16th–19th-century palaces and houses of the local gentry and nobility. Most of the palaces are on or near the two main squares: Piazza del Popolo by the Chiesa Madre (Main Church) with its 17-century fountain and the larger Piazza Umberto I (also known as Piazza Jaringhi). Among these are the Palazzi La Rocca (currently the Municipio or City Hall on Via S. Maria Maggiore), Cipriani-Avolio (Piazza Umberto I), Giacchesio (Piazza Umberto I), Cercone (Piazza del Popolo), Lisio (Piazza del Popolo), Jacobucci (Via S. Maria Maggiore at Porta Jaringhi), Di Lorenzo (Casa Sor Marchette at Porta Jaringhi), Massa (Piazza Umberto I), Trasmondi-Abate (Via S. Marco), Granata (Via S. Marco), Pelini (Piazza del Popolo), Simone (Via S. Marco), Pitassi-Rossi (now Ristorante Taverna Caldora on Piazza Umberto I), Rossi-Tonno (original palace of Don Orazio Rossi at Piazza del Popolo) and Borsilli (Piazza del Popolo).

=== Caldora/Cantelmo Castle ===
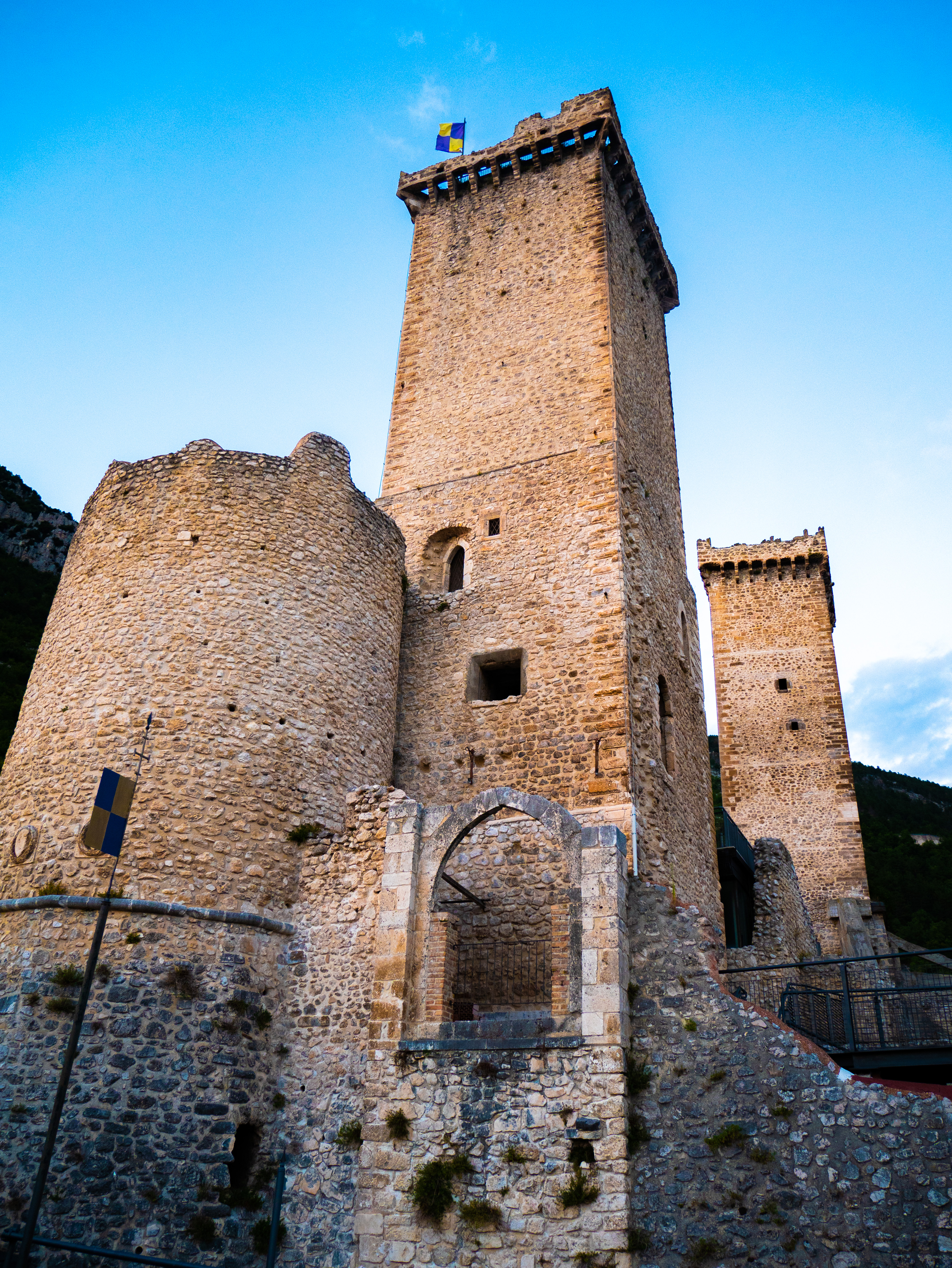
Caldora Castle

Above the medieval part of the town, on the Colle Castello (Castle Hill,) rests the Caldora/Cantelmo Castle of Pacentro. The castle is built on a trapezoidal foundation with a tower on every corner. Today, only three of the four towers have survived. There are also some circular bastions that remain. All of these are clearly visible as one approaches Pacentro from the Conca Peligna (Peligna Valley) below.

A castle has been on this site since approximately the 11th century, though the current structure was begun in the late 14th/early 15th century during Pacentro's feudal domination by the Caldora/Cantelmo Family. The Orsinis added the circular bastions and other improvements in the late 15th century. The castle has been extensively restored since it was purchased by the Comune of Pacentro in 1957. The towers and walls were cleaned and repaired and structural reinforcement was completed with the use of reinforced concrete. Ramps, bridges, gates and railings were added to enable the structure to be toured safely by tourists.

== Festas, holy days, and special events ==
The feast of San Marco Evangelista, the original town patron saint, is on April 25.

The feast of Corpus Christi (or Corpus Domini) falls a month or so after Easter and features a procession with several altars erected throughout the village

In July is the Festa del Ritorno, an event organized by the "Cooperativa Agricola Rivera Pacentro" in honor of the people who emigrated in the past century from this town.

In August is the Rievocazione Storica, a medieval festival celebrating the times of the Caldora lords featuring medieval costumes and parades at the castle.

The Festa of the Madonna of Loreto is the first Sunday in September and is very popular with a procession and an exciting barefoot race (Corsa degli Zingari) from the Mountains to the Church.

In October is the feast of the Madonna del SS. Rosario (Our Lady of the Most Holy Rosary) and in November is the Feast of St. Charles Borromeo with a procession and the inflating of a giant hot air balloon in the Piazza Jaringhi.

The town has several ancient religious organizations known as Confraternities. There are four still in existence: San Carlo, SS. Rosario, Madonna di Loreto and Santa Croce. The Confraternities are each responsible, along with the Pastor, for the coordination of the various festas.

== Population, emigration, and family history ==
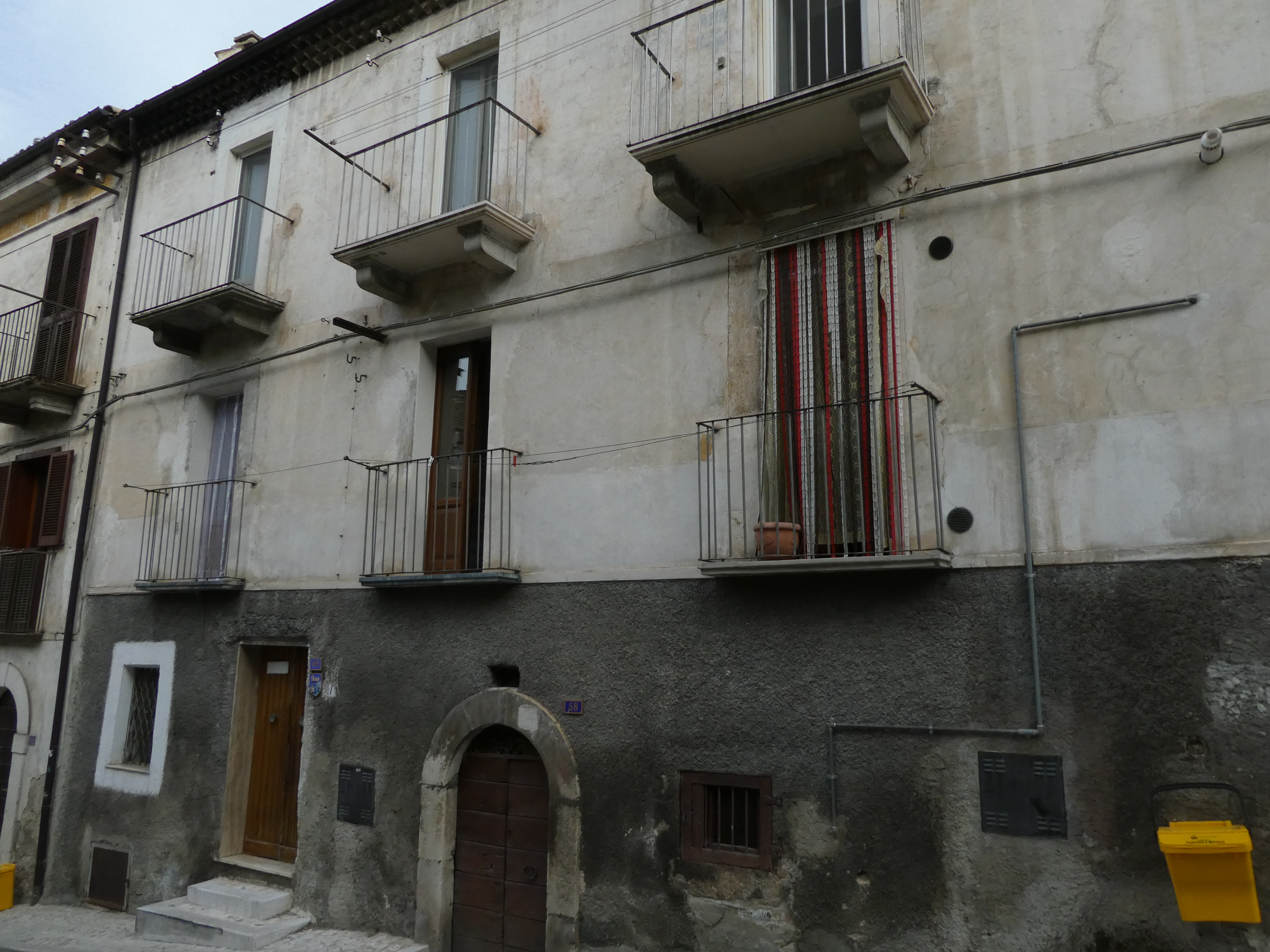
The house of the paternal grandparents of the American entertainer Madonna

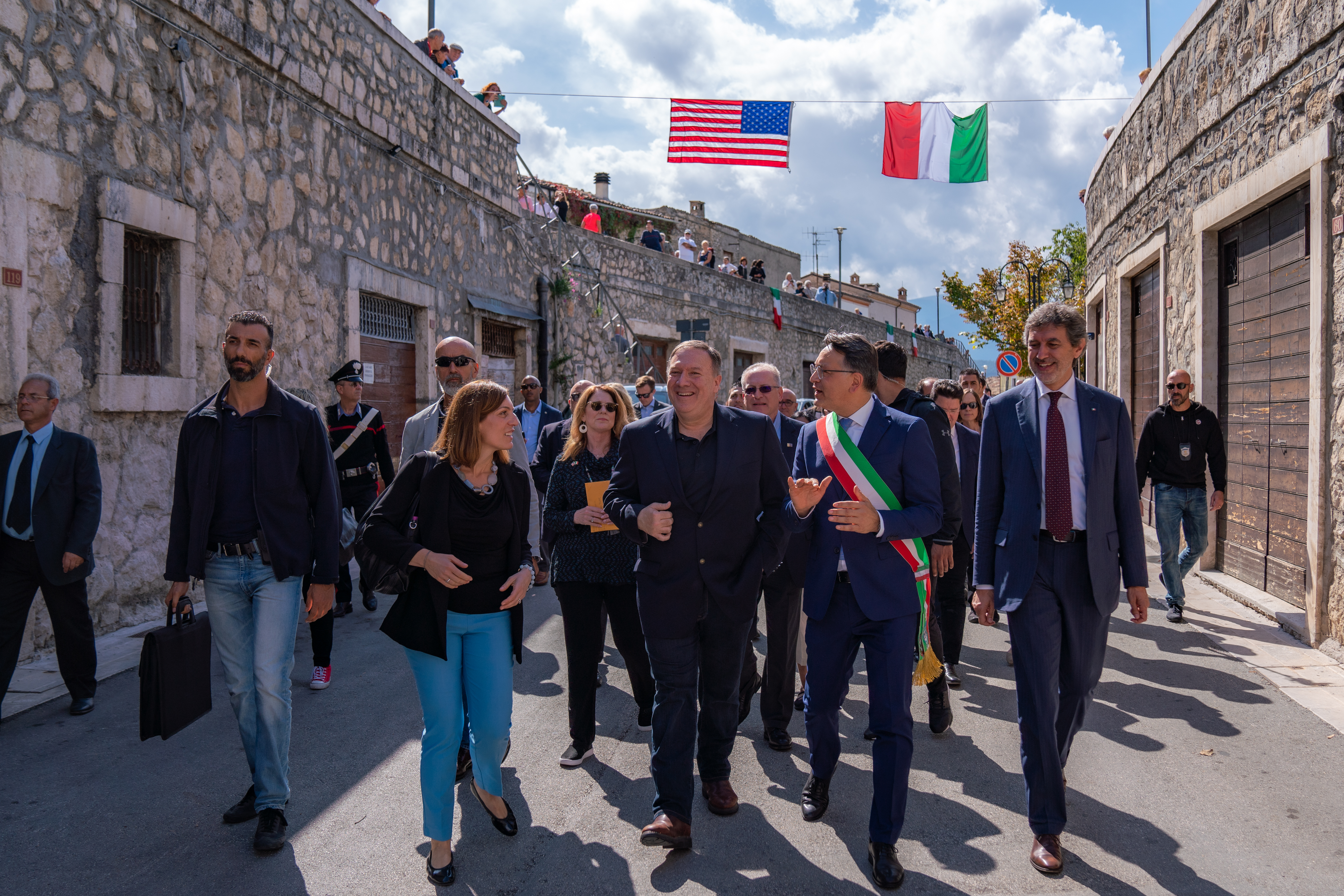
The former Secretary of State of the United States Mike Pompeo visits the Pacentro World War Memorial

The population peaked in 1911 with over 4,000 inhabitants. Today with the population just under 1100, most of the population emigrated after World War II. Many went to the United States, Latin America and Australia. There are many clubs and cultural associations for Pacentrani and their descendants around the world.

Among those descendants are the following:

- American entertainer Madonna. Her paternal grandparents Gaetano Ciccone and Michelina Di Iulio came from Pacentro.
- Francesco Buccitelli is also from Pacentro.
- Mike Pompeo, former Secretary of State of the United States of America from 2018 to 2021. His paternal great-grandparents, Carlo Pompeo and Adelina Tollis had their origins in the town.

== See also ==
- Hermitage of San Germano

== Sources ==
- Santini, Raffaele (1976). Pacentro: aspetti storico-geografici. Arsgrafika Vivarelli.
- Tollis, Camillo (1979). Pacentro: storia, tradizione, leggenda, folclore dalla preistoria ad oggi.
- Di Cesare, Augusto (1986). Conoscere un paese: Pacentro, Elementi di storia politica, demografica, religiosa, economica e sociale.
- Associazione Culturale Pacentrana (1979–2009). Un Mese in Pacentro (periodical).
- Archivio di Stato di Napoli (1753). Catasto Onciario – Università di Pacentro.
