= Francesco Buccitelli =

Italian modern artist

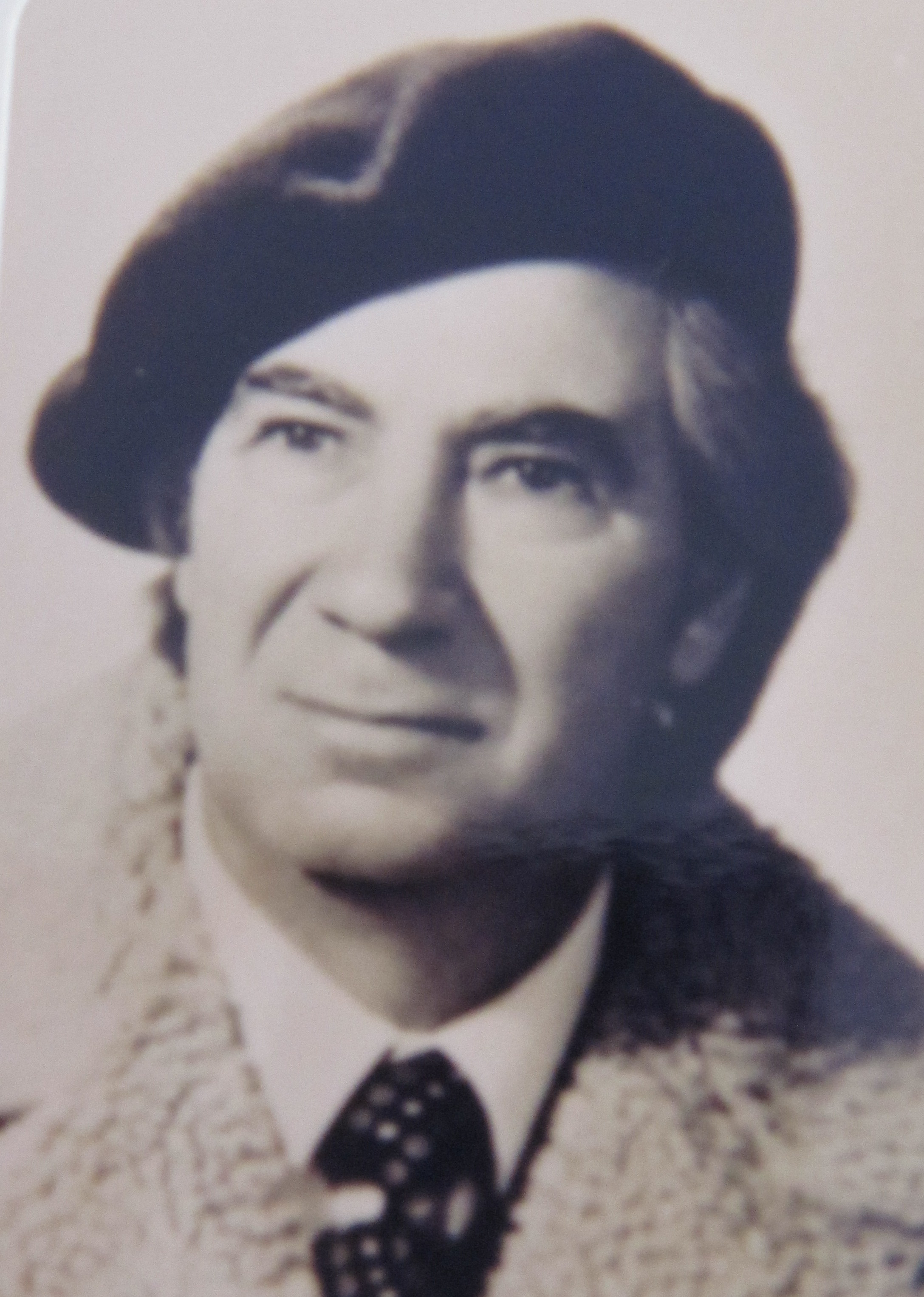
- Born: 5 November 1922; Pacentro, L'Aquila, Italy
- Died: 17 February 1989 (aged 66); Pacentro, L'Aquila, Italy
- Known for: painting, drawing

Francesco Buccitelli (November 5, 1922 – February 17, 1989) was an Italian modern artist. He was active in post-war Italy depicting life in the Mezzogiorno in Italy. He was influenced by the striking poverty of his homeland compared with the modernization of post-war Italy. He worked in various artistic media including drawing on paper and oils on both canvas and wood.

== Life ==
Buccitelli was born in 1922 in Pacentro, province of L'Aquila in the Abruzzo region of Italy to Luigi Buccitelli and Antonietta Corsetti. He studied at Istituto statale d'arte di Firenze in Florence, Italy. He served two terms as mayor (December 1964 – July 1970, July 1970 – July 1975) of his hometown of Pacentro, Italy. In 1988, he was awarded a 2nd Class / Grand Officer title by Order of Merit of the Italian Republic.

== Work ==
Buccitelli's work focused on life in the Mezzogiorno specifically in his hometown of Pacentro, Italy.

An example of his painting include "La Vicina di Casa / The Girl Next Door" showing the everyday life of inhabitants of his hometown.

His work has been widely shown throughout Italy and France. Exhibitions included "L'arte nella vita del Mezzogiorno d'Italia" in 1953 and the XIII Quadriennale of Contemporary Art in 1999, both in Rome, Italy. His work "Verso Casa" is part of the permanent collection of the Pinacoteca di Bari "Corrado Giaquinto".

== Legacy ==
Buccitelli's hometown of Pacentro recognized his lifetime achievements and had a prominent street named after him.
