= Campo di Giove =

- Comune
- Comune di Campo di Giove
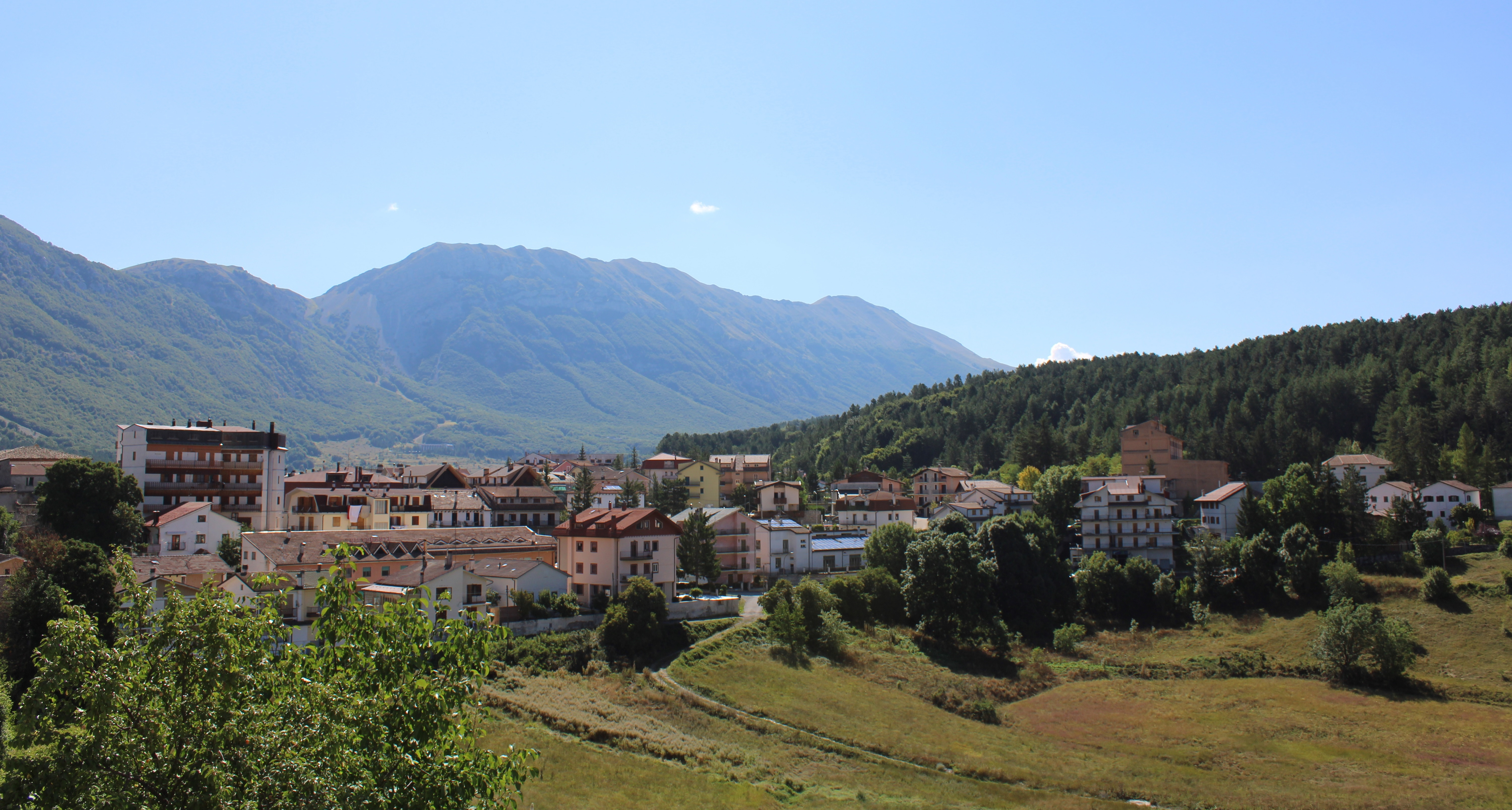

- Location within Italy Location within Abruzzo
- Coordinates: 42°0′40″N 14°2′25″E
- Country: Italy
- Region: Abruzzo
- Province: L'Aquila (AQ)

Government
  - Mayor: Giovanni Di Mascio

Area
  - Total: 28.9 km^{2} (11.2 sq mi)
- Elevation: 1,064 m (3,491 ft)

Population (30 April 2017)
  - Total: 788
  - Density: 27.3/km^{2} (70.6/sq mi)
- Demonym: Campogiovesi
- Time zone: UTC+1 (CET)
  - Summer (DST): UTC+2 (CEST)
- Patron saint: St. Eustace
- Saint day: 20 September
- Website: Official website

Campo di Giove is a town and comune in the province of L'Aquila in the Abruzzo region of central Italy. Its territory is included in the Majella National Park. Located at the foot of the southwestern slope of the Majella, it is a holiday resort in summer and winter, thanks to the presence of a ski station. In English, its name means 'Campus Jovis'.

A snapshot of Campo di Giove history from its origins to the end of WWII

Whether its origins are religious or military (1), Campo di Giove is a name that goes back a very long way. It was almost certainly a stop on the road that crosses the western slope of the Maiella massif, a famous road used, according to Tito Livio, by Hannibal on his journeys to and from Rome in 217 and 211 BC. Another man to pass through with his soldiers was Hugh, Count of Vermandois, who travelled to the Holy Land for the First Crusade (1096-1099) (2), as suggested by the Arab geographer al-Idrisi when he wrote of the group of soldiers passing through places to which he ascribed colourful names such as Balanah (Palena) and Bagianbru (Pacentro). The Campo di Giove area has always been populated to some degree. Evidence of life can be found in several places. From the palaeolithic period there is “Maiella Man”, who lived in the famous caves of the Maiella massif; from the later neolithic period, the “pago” on the Il Tescino lake, near which the chipped stone can be found to this day. Once the land between habitable, it is likely that people started to move from the mountains to the valley. In the Iron Age, the “pagi” of Pian de’ Tòfani, l’Ara and Guado di Coccia (3), which lasted throughout the Italic and Roman times, consisted of early humans with Italic and later Roman blood. These were shepherds who lived in the great outdoors among fragrant pastures and with a fresh, plentiful supply of water from the Maiella springs. They would spend the winters in the valley, in Apulia, in the Roman countryside or, according to Il Torcia, in the Maremma coastal region (4).

A temple dedicated to the father of the gods, the origin of which remains a mystery, was built around 300BC at the beginning of the Via di Coccia (between l’Ara and Il Tescino). Legend has it that, following a bitter feud between the Paeligni and the Romans, the Paeligni had won the day when a huge storm turned the outcome of the battle on its head, and the Romans celebrated their success brought about by the rain by constructing a temple to Jupiter on the site where the Sant’Eustachio church can now be found. One thing we know for sure is that the entire area, turned into a military encampment during the summer (remember that 300BC falls between the Second and Third Samnite Wars), was called Campus Jovis. After the fall of the Western Roman Empire, not even those living among the mountains were spared the arrival of the barbarians. The “pagi” were too close to the Via Numicia and disappeared. The sheep-migration roads were no longer safe and the flocks were diminishing. Rather than the “pagi”, the shepherds preferred huts that could be transported from one field to the next; the grazing was now done not by large migrating flocks but by the few non-migratory sheep remaining that were needed to sustain life.

The Barbarians

kept coming. In chronological order, there were mass stampedes across Italy by the Goths (410), the Vandals (455), the Lombards (575), the Franks (800), the Saracens (835) and the Hungarians and Normans (throughout the 9th and 10th centuries). When they were not frantically fleeing the mountains in terror, the local people quickly rediscovered their old Italic virtues, like in 937 when the Paeligni and the Marsi joined forces to surprise and defeat a group of loot-bearing Hungarian soldiers in a canyon (5). From the 6th to the 10th centuries, the small houses and huts on the plateau of Campo di Giove served as a refuge for the few natives and the many who had been forced to flee or move around. Only in 934 did the monks of San Vincenzo al Volturno, perhaps having built San Nicolò di Coccia on the deserted mountain heathland, descend from the Guado di Coccia to the plateau below, and the shepherds who had fled to the slopes of the Maiella were rounded up and settled by the monks in what is now the old town of Campo di Giove, which as you can see today is on a steep hill. It was also a walled area. A map dating from 1584 reveals that the only houses in the town were those on the hill (6).

“When the Saracens invaded, the universal advice was to gather at monasteries to avoid falling into the hands of the barbarians, and these monasteries became lodgings from which towns and villages sprang up” (7). In the 9th century, the area comprising the Diocese of Valva was one of the most damaged by the incursions of the Saracens, who massacred and burned on top of the usual looting. These bloody incursions prompted, particularly among religious institutions, the noble challenge of building walled fortresses and safe havens away from roaming vassals, protecting against raids. As such, the monks who descended from the Guado di Coccia aimed to gather together in a single fortress the people who were scattered across the slopes of the Maiella. Already walled, the fortress was then equipped with towers and defences by Giacomo Caldora in 1421, transforming it into a proper castle. And so, just a stone’s throw from the old temple of Jupiter, a new Christian community was founded where the monks from San Vincenzo al Volturno would teach religious and civic duties. The first residents of Campo di Giove were a mixture of Neanderthals, Paeligni, Romans and Lombards. We know the Lombards (568-775) were here from civil history, because they preferred to spread out among our mountains with their weapons, families, animals, furnishings and loot (8). But it is also made apparent by religious history. Indeed, the worship of San Michele (San Angelo) was brought to us by the converted Lombards (King Agilulf converted to Catholicism in 603 ). The church of Sant’Angelo in Cansano, which appears in the 1183 papal bull of Pope Lucius IIII (9), offers evidence of a Lombard community in our area.

In the 12th century,

the area of Campo di Giove became a fief made up of 24 families (10). We know the Lombards (568-775) were here from civil history, because they preferred to spread out among our mountains with their weapons, families, animals, furnishings and loot (8). But it is also made apparent by religious history. Indeed, the worship of San Michele (San Angelo) was brought to us by the converted Lombards (King Agilulf converted to Catholicism in 591). The church of Sant’Angelo in Cansano, which appears in the 1183 papal bull of Pope Lucius IIII (9), offers evidence of a Lombard community in our area. the area of Campo di Giove became a fief made up of 24 families (10). It is thought that upon their descent from the Guado, the monks encountered more people than would be there on their departure. Refugees and those deemed surplus to requirements were certainly moved on. The 24 families that remained gradually assumed the characteristics of people from the Diocese of Valva: they became the soul of an orderly, calm and pious place. These people gathered in and protected by the Castello formed a fief that yielded 20 ounces of gold and was therefore taxed with one cavalryman and two servants (squires or foot soldiers). However, the Castello offered double this (two soldiers and four squires) for the First Crusade to the Holy Land. Oddone Signore di Pettorano, who had evidently acquired the Volturnesi fief, sold the Castello to the Cassinesi in 1073. In 1136, Manerio di Bernardo (1136-1141), the Count of Palena, made a donation to San Nicolò di Coccia, a spur of the Maiella to the west of Palena, and the texts mention a certain Odorisio from Campo di Giove. Among the seven witnesses in the document cited by Antinori (11), the fourth is: “E. (ego) Odorisius Presbiter qui fui de Campo Jovis sign. cr. f.". As far as anyone is aware, this was the first time that the name of a Campo di Giove resident appeared in a document. The date was 14 January 1136. Antinori wrote: “It is unknown whether the man from Campo di Giove became a priest, perhaps a parish priest in Palena, or maybe he was indicating that he was a parish priest in Campo di Giove”. In 1136, Campo di Giove was obviously a rural community with no fortifications. THE CHURCH OF SANT’ANTONINO with the monastery annex (farmhouse) Where? Right at the entrance to the beech forests that line the slopes of Monte Amaro, in the contrada that today still bears the name of Sant’Antonino, in the countryside of Campo di Giove, close to a fresh spring located 1,530 m above sea level.

The Sant’Antonino Convent

Although only the spring remains now, the farmhouse at Sant’Antonino played a big part in local life. On 23 November ind. ne XII, Bartolomeo from Campo di Giove, on behalf of the Sulmona Chapter, took action against the local archpriest for the payment of the annual rent of two carlini for the Sant’Antonino church (12). And, just like so many other medieval fortresses, the Sant’Antonino Convent communicated with the Sulmona valley and its overlooking villages, such as Prezza, by way of light signals. When was it founded? In Pope Gregory X’s papal bull of 21 March 1274 confirming the Order, Sant’Antonino in Campo di Giove was listed as one of the SIXTEEN convents built up to that point by Fra Pietro da Morrone (Pope Celestine V). Pugliese (13) wrongly asserts that Sant’Antonino was sold to the Benedictines of Pulsano in 1255. This sale actually took place in 1285 and was confirmed by Fra Pietro(14). If the Sant’Antonino Convent existed in 1255, it was probably built during the three years (1246–49) when Fra Pietro lived at Santo Spirito in Maiella, sheltering from the masses so he could peacefully - at least temporarily - pursue his anchorite vocation. It is, however, more likely that Sant’Antonino was built between 1264 and 1274, therefore after Pope Urban IV approved the Order on 1 October 1264. The Sant’Antonino Convent was traded on 6 November 1285. It was transferred by the Celestines to the Abbot of Santa Maria in Pulsano on Mount Gargano in exchange for San Pietro di Vallebona in Manoppello. Perhaps this was because the shepherds of Campo di Giove were familiar with Gargano as they took their migrating sheep there. What we know for sure is that they lived their lives among Celestine monks in this hermitage of Sant’Antonio, with the only sounds coming from birdsong and the trickling of the nearby spring. It was only a farmhouse, so it was not a big convent, but it was so venerated as to yield ONE HUNDRED ounces of gold within the space of a few years. Next to the spring from which fresh water still gushes, the only things that remain are a few fragments of the old walls, but the enchanting location lies just off the new, scenic Macchie di Secina road, which has enabled it to emerge as one of the tourist hotspots of the western Maiella. THE CALDORAS AND THE CANTELMOS During the period of Angevin rule (1266-1422), Campo di Giove was initially owned by the Di Bifero barons (Luca and grandsons Tommaso and Andrea), as shown clearly in an exhibition in 1279(15).

During Feudalism

In 1294, however, the baron of the fief was Bartolomeo Galgano, who on 3 August 1294 was entrusted by Charles II of Naples (Charles the Lame) with the Pratola Castle at the Abbey of the Holy Spirit at Morrone (on July 5 of that year, Fra Pietro had been elected Pope Celestine at the Conclave of Perugia): Campo di Giove had another new baron in 1316, when it was owned by the barons of Colledimacine Ruggero and his grandsons. Corrado and Andrea di Bifero (or Bifulco). This was the period of revolt against the barons, and while Cansano, with its barons kicked out, fell to the Cantelmos of Popoli between 1326 and 1439, Campo di Giove was donated by Charles II of Naples to Baron Bartolomeo Piscitello, who remained there until his death in 1334, and then passed to his heirs, who held onto it until the end of the 1300s. After them, the new feudatories of Campo di Giove (Baron De Capite of Sulmona, Baroness Luczinardo, etc.) had to deal with not only the Caldoras (Angevins) but also the Cantelmo (Aragonese). Indeed, in 1383 Campo di Giove was under the control of Giacomo Cantelmo who, during the frequent uprisings against King Charles III retreated with his three sons into his fiefs in Pacentro, Campo di Giove, Pettorano or Prezza, whichever was most suitable, in order to avoid arrest. His sons would quickly leave these fiefs and tear through the Sulmona area, causing ruin, looting and killing (16). On September 12, the residents of Sulmona protested in vain to the king. One person implicated in an uprising against Charles III (Charles the Short) was an abbot from Cansano, Fra Angelo, from whom the king seized back all socage amounting to four ounces “…bona feudalia que Abbas Angelus de Canzano, rebellis noster notorius, tenet in Castro Canzani et districtu” (17). Under the rule of the Durazzesco branch of the Angevins (1381-1435), there was a notable struggle between the Angevins and the Aragonese for ownership of Campo di Giove and Pacentro (18). These fiefs were gifts from Rita Cantelmo. As a punishment for rebelling, Queen Joanna II took the land of Campo di Giove away from Rita’s husband Giacomo Caldora and gave it to Francesco Cantelmo, Count di Popoli, who in turn sold Campo di Giove to his brother Antonio. However, as soon as Jacopo Caldora reconciled with the Queen, he reclaimed Campo di Giove. There then followed a series of disputes that lasted until 1417. In any event, Campo di Giove was in the hands of the Caldoras in 1421. That was the year when Giacomo Caldora fortified the estate at Campo di Giove and when that fortress began to be known as Castrum Jovis or Castrum Campi Jovis THE SACK The war during which in 1425 the fortress of Campo di Giove was sacked following a three-day siege had two condottieri: Braccio da Montone

The Caldora-Cantelmo struggle

and Giacomo Caldora, the “Great Captain” and Lord of Campo di Giove who never held the title of Count. He preferred either Duke or Prince. So why did Braccio da Montone go against Giacomo Caldora in Campo di Giove? Braccio da Montone was fighting for Queen Joanna II and her adopted son Alfonso of Aragon; and Giacomo Caldora was fighting for René of Anjou, a relative of but opposed to the Queen because she had adopted the Aragonese. In 1420, Braccio pursued Caldora in order to recover the Kingdom of the Two Sicilies for Joanna II, and it was right here in Campo di Giove that the Abruzzi surrendered. Travelling through Marche and into the Valley of Pescara, he passed through the Valle Peligna and abandoned it; he intimidated Sulmona, forcing it to adopt his magistrates and guards in the name of the Queen; he laid siege to Pacentro, which duly surrendered, and took the rugged roads of the Maiella to hurry into Caldora-controlled Campo di Giove, which attempted in vain to defend itself and was burned. He then led his strong squadrons directly to Castel di Sangro, descending into the Terra di Lavoro (19). When Giacomo Caldora died (25 November 1443), the Cantelmos owned Campo di Giove. In addition to the county of Popoli, Onofrio Gaspare Cantelmo owned the lands of Forca (Furcae Pelignorum), il Pesco (Pescocostanzo), Pacentro and Campo di Giove, which then returned to the Caldoras (Antonio) until 1463. In that year, however, he lost all his fiefs when he rebelled against Alfonso’s successor Ferdinand I to pursue John, Duke of Anjou, who had gone to France to take back the Kingdom. All the Caldora fiefs were handed over to the King. Campo di Giove was therefore under sovereign rule between 1463 and 1479, during which time it was governed by Magnificus Miles Valentino Claver, a servant of the King. In 1473, the Universities of Campo di Giove and Pacentro asked him to lay boundary stones between the two estates, of which he was also the Lord (20). A CAROUSEL OF FEUDATORIES Now that the duel between the Cantelmos and the Caldoras was over, Ferdinand I sold Campo di Giove and Cansano to Vito Nicola di Procida (1479-1482) for 1,500 ducats, but upon his death in 1482 his son Gianfrancesco sold the two fiefs to the Belprato counts “cum omnibus juribus… pronut Nicolaus eius pater emerat”. The Belprato family owned Campo di Giove for 149 years, until 1631, but the sun was now setting on the feudal era. The de facto landowners and de jure feudatories were the barons and the Church. And this was also when the Ricciardi came onto the scene in Campo di Giove. On 29 July 1617 (celebratis tribus canonicis publicationibus) Donato Ricciardi married one Beatrice Cocco (21).

The various Lords

Here is a brief timeline of the Belprato dynasty: Gianvincenzo (+1505) Gianmberardino Gianvincenzo II Berardino. In 1555, Gianvincenzo II’s son Berardino married Virginia Orsini, the daughter of Latino and granddaughter of Mario (1483), the Count of Pacentro. Carlo (1515) Virginia (+1631) (22). The death in 1631 of Virginia Belprato (the granddaughter of Virginia Orsini) brought the dynasty (1482-1631) to a close (23), and Campo di Giove passed into the hands of the Di Capuas, princes of Roccaromana, until 1715 in direct line, and then in indirect line, to the Di Capuas and Del Blazos until 1697, and the Pignatellis until 1715 (24). In 1715, Campo di Giove was once again sold to Donna Cecilia Spinelli, who in turn sold it to her father Don Francesco M. Spinelli, the Prince of Scalea, but he disposed of it immediately. And so the conveyor belt of owners of Campo di Giove kept rolling. The feudatories of the last feudal holding bought and sold the local people as if they were animals being traded at country fairs. On 30 January 1715 (25), the Spinelli princes sold (without a buyback clause) the Estate (26), containing the fief of Campo di Giove, to Don Francesco Recupito of Naples (who had already purchased the Estate of Pacentro in 1712). Campo di Giove passed from Francesco Recupito (+30 November 1727) to his son Donato (+18 August 1735). It was during Donato’s rule that Sciarra Colonna swept through the Abruzzi (a. 1729). Upon his death, Donato left his wife Maddalena d’Afflitto, “nanny and guardian” of Pasquale Recupito, the Marquess of Raiano and of the Estate of Anversa (Anversa, Villalago, Cansano and Campo di Giove). A document from 1755 (27) petitions against the custom of the people of Cansano and Campo di Giove of loudly and publicly celebrating the resurrection of Christ at Easter. In 1756, Campo di Giove was under Introdacqua as a court of justice. These courts ceased to exist in 1810 because the French replaced them with their judicial districts which in 1861 became magistrate's courts, with Campo di Giove, both as a judicial district (1810) and as a magistrate’s court (1861), falling under Sulmona. Don Pasquale (+29 August 1766) was succeeded by his son Salvatore (28). In turn, Salvatore was succeeded by his consort Saveria Recupito, Marchioness of Raiano, Countess of Saponara. In 1808, it was she who brought the last baronial rights before the Feudal Commission, for the Santa Maria feudal serf tax and the port and stamp duty authorities, which were invalidated by the decrees issued on 2 June and 1 September 1806 by Joseph Bonaparte, who abolished the feudal system for good.

The beginnings of the contemporary era

When the feudal system ended in 1806, it immediately became an anachronism that was no longer part of the national fabric. There were new political and social concepts emerging in society. These were two very different and contrasting worlds: the old world had been all about immunity, privilege and servitude; the new one swept these values aside and replaced them with liberty, equality and fraternity. Having decreed the abolition of the feudal system on 2 June 1806, on September 1 of the same year Joseph Bonaparte divided up feudal properties three ways: municipal public property, former feudatories and former vassals. The long-standing families of Campo di Giove displayed their civic honesty - that rarest of commodities - in how the fief was divided up. The entire area of pastures surrounding the residential area (excluding the small area of church land with the Sant’Eustachio church at its centre) was awarded to the municipality as public property. The reason for this is clear: Since there was a robust farming industry in the village, it was in everybody’s interest to keep the relevant assets intact*. *Source: “Campo di Giove – GUIDA STORICA ARTISTICA” – by VIRGILIO ORSINI – Tipografia Labor, Sulmona ALL RIGHTS RESERVED.

Primiano Marcucci

Primiano Marcucci was a much sought-after bandit.

In 1864, there was a reward of 1,000 ducats (4,250 lire, 2.19 euros[lc6] ) for anyone who secured his arrest or took him in combat. The same reward was available to any individual who managed to capture or kill him, even if said person did so by way of banditry. Popular memory recalls that Vincenzo Ricciardi, irked by Primiano’s relationship with a Palena woman called Giovannella, ordered the young man to leave her for a girl from Campo di Giove. Primiano refused to yield to the demands of his master, who mistreated him in public. He became a bandit and joined forces with several gangs operating in the Maiella and surrounding areas. Before long, he became the undisputed leader. But his overriding wish was for revenge against Vincenzo Ricciardi. He took all his animals and threw them off a Maiella cliff known as the Pesce di Baccalà; even more of a stir was caused by the assault on Palazzo Ricciardi (now the municipal headquarters of Campo di Giove), in which Primiano led around sixty bandits, including the infamous Ermenegildo Bucci and Nunzio Tamburrini, who succumbed to a barrage from members of the Ricciardi family and their servants. It is likely that the bandits were after a considerable loot to finance their escape to America.

He had a son with Giovannella who was unable to look after the child: “I will have him brought up by a shepherd friend of mine, and he too will become a bandit”. Sadly, the little one had short life. Fearing that the guards would discover his links with the bandits, the shepherd killed him. Having uncovered this outrage, Primiano drowned the unfaithful sharecropper in the furnace he used to boil milk for processing cheese. In spite of the frequent armed robberies, kidnappings, blackmailing of squires and murders, the local people were fond of the bandits and supported their struggle. Primiano would often give money to struggling local families, particularly those including men who were ill and unable to work. Pension rights remained a pipe dream. Primiano Marcucci was captured during the Roman campaign in 1864. He was sentenced to death for an unspecified number of murders (popular memory claims at least one hundred), but the sentence was commuted to life in prison. In 1911, he returned to Campo di Giove after 47 years inside. He died in 1918 in an old people’s home in L’Aquila, abandoned by his family.

Campo di Giove during the Second World War

There are several examples of locals fiercely resisting the tyranny and violence of fascism and Nazism. Campo di Giove was at the heart of the first flickers of the Abruzzo resistance and, very early on, served as the headquarters of an important partisan organisation. Timeline of key events:

10.09.1943 German troops occupy Rome.

14.09.1943 The first three Allied prisoners to escape from the Fonte d’Amore concentration camp in Sulmona arrive in Campo di Giove.

26.09.1943 The Allies fiercely attack Sulmona with bombs and machine guns.

10.10.1943 Trucks from Caramanico full of German soldiers pass through Campo di Giove and head towards Sulmona.

12.10.1943 Local men take shelter in the mountains to avoid sweeps, while some German troops patrol the residential area and spread panic among the population.

13.10.1943 The first motor-powered patrols arrive, and an Allied aircraft plummets onto the Maiella at around 10pm.

15.10.1943 Local partisans and escaped prisoners ambush two German trucks on the road between Cansano and Campo di Giove.

16.10.1943 The Germans raid Campo di Giove homes on the hunt for the escaped prisoners.

17.10.1943 At 4am, the SS invades the town and threatens to kill everyone. There are thorough searches and a manhunt. Don Virgilio Orsini, the parish priest of Campo di Giove is put in front of a firing squad but spared.

18.10.1943 An intense gunfight between Germans and partisans on Mount Coccia causes the deaths of a German and Second Lieutenant Ettore De Corti and an injury to Captain G. Gancini.

19.10.1943 Campo di Giove is occupied by a German parachute regiment. A curfew and severe restrictions are put in place.

20.10.1943 A heavy sweep, deportation and searching of homes by the German. The podestà (mayor) is once again interrogated and threatened with death.

21.10.1943 The SS returns, the men are rounded up and put in front of the firing squad, the podestà is arrested and imprisoned pending execution and the parish priest Don Virgilio Tornano is interrogated again. However, there is no evidence so everyone returns to their homes. News arrives that the town will be burned but then contradictory orders come from Sulmona.

27/28.10.1943 Another German parachute regiment arrives. The first snow falls on the Maiella.

07.11.1943 An official evacuation notice is served on the town: refugees must leave immediately, the old and the infirm on the 9th and everyone else on the 10th. The podestà and the parish priest fought in vain for the order to be revoked, but were successfully only in securing an extension of a single day for the evacuation.

08.11.1943 The entire family of Maria Di Marzio is at risk of going before the firing squad.

11.11.1943 The evacuation of Campo di Giove is confirmed.

21.11.1943 Field Marshal Kesselring is appointed Supreme Commander of German forces in Italy.

02.12.1943 The Allies reach the Gustav Line. At Montecassino, the Allies engage in the fiercest assault so far in the Italian campaign. Field Marshal Kesselring shores up the Adriatic area with the 90th Panzergrenadier Division and the Maiella massif with two mountain battalions.

06.01.1944 A damaged Allied aircraft crash lands on the Cerrèto plain in Cansano. Nino Verna and Anselmo Santilli head to the scene. Luckily, the pilot survives.

January First Battle of Cassino.

February Second Battle of Cassino. The monastery is razed to the ground. Soldiers and civilians from Campo di Giove, Sulmona, the surrounding areas and other parts of Italy begin to cross the lines.

March Third Battle of Cassino. The town is reduced to rubble. People continue to flow across the lines.

25.03.1944 Townsman Eustachio Del Mastro, an Italian-American, finds three suspicious youngsters in the Verna house who wish to cross the lines. They turn out to be English and are given help.

12.05.1944 Fourth Battle of Cassino. The Allied 5th and 8th Armies begin their offensive at the Gustav Line.

17.05.1944 Field Marshal Kesselring orders the evacuation of Montecassino.

18.05.1944 The German resistance in Montecassino ends. The Gustav Line is breached for good.

May/June The fighting moves to the crest of the Maiella.

04.06.1944 The Allies occupy Rome.

07.06.1944 Campo di Giove watches on as German troops continually retreat towards Caramanico.

08.06.1944 There are no Germans left in the town. Some locals head to Monte Coccia and fly a bedsheet as a white flag to signal to the Allies coming from the east of the Maiella that it was safe to advance.

08/09.06.1944 Campo di Giove is occupied by the Allies, who are greeted by the sound of bells. The evacuees return home.

We would like to sincerely thank Prof Mauro d’Amico, author of the book “Campo di Giove -I 38 Paesi del Parco Nazionale della Maiella” (pp. 96–102) from which this data was taken and translated into English by Ing Luciano Capaldo a citizen of Campo di Giove.

== See also ==
- Hermitage of Madonna di Coccia
