= History of Tocco da Casauria =

History of the municipality of Tocco da Casauria, Italy

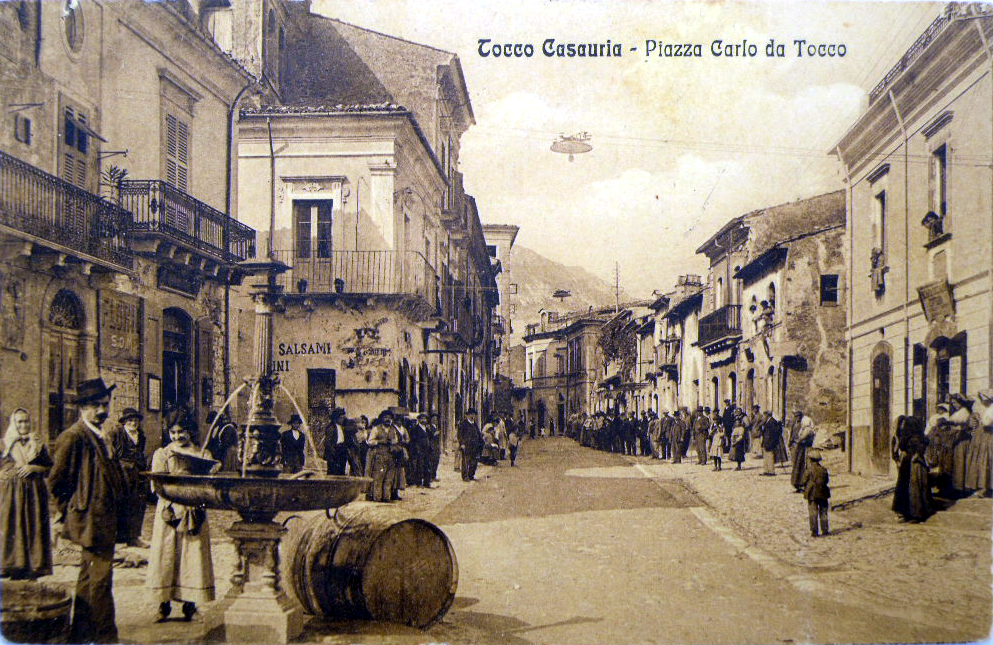
Via Municipio, historical photo

The history of Tocco da Casauria traces its origins to the foundation of the first settlement of Interpromium in ancient times. After the disappearance of that settlement in the Middle Ages, the present town of Tocco was formed, developing around the two most important town buildings (Caracciolo Castle and the church of St. Eustace) as a result of a succession of rivalries between the Abbey of San Clemente a Casauria, to which the territories of Tocco belonged de jure, and lords of Germanic origin who attempted to usurp them by force.

== Ancient age ==
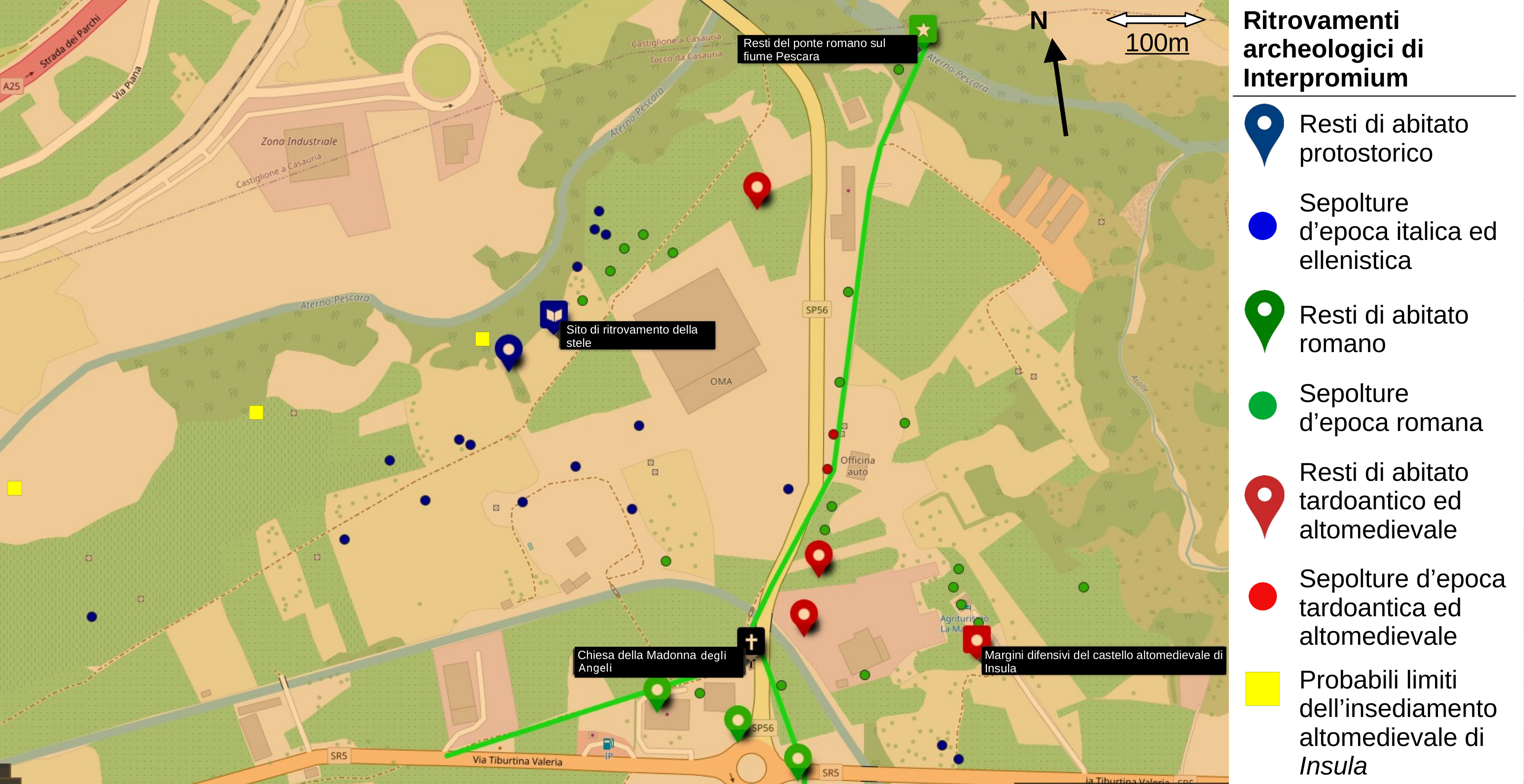
The plateau where the Church of Our Lady of the Angels is today, between the Pescara River and the intersection connecting SP 56 (heading toward the Abbey of San Clemente a Casauria and Torre de' Passeri) to the SS 5, which traces the ancient Via Tiburtina Valeria, is the site of the Interpromium settlement on which numerous archaeological finds have been unearthed dating back to different periods: protohistoric, Italic/Hellenistic, Roman and early medieval times

Although Tocco is of medieval foundation, there was already a settlement (pagus) called Interpromium in its territory in ancient times. Its location was not near the present town of Tocco (placed on an elevated area), but on the valley floor where the Via Tiburtina Valeria (today traced by State Road 5) passed near the plateau where the church of Our Lady of the Angels is today. The ancient settlement was about 25.5 km away from Corfinium. It has not yet been established with absolute certainty which Italic people inhabited it, whether the Marrucini or the Peligni, although historians consider the Peligni to have been more likely. Regarding its destruction, it is believed to have been caused by natural disasters such as earthquakes or floods, although the area of the ancient settlement was continued to be inhabited until the early Middle Ages.

== Middle Ages ==
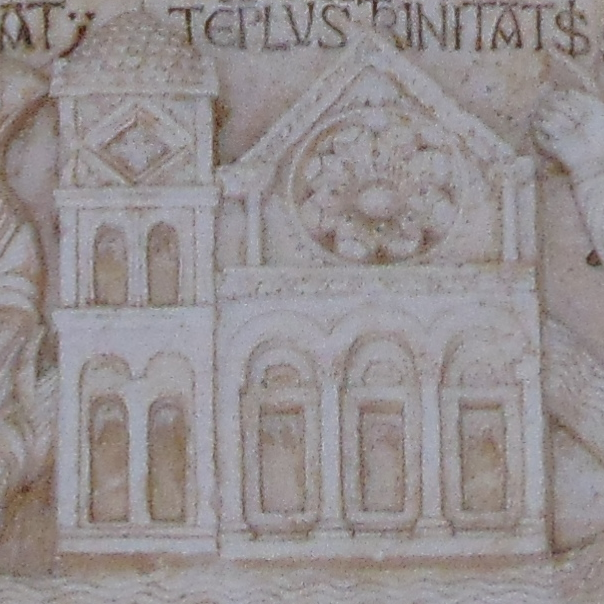
Depiction of the early medieval Abbey of San Clemente a Casauria

The most important document on medieval Tocco is the Chronicon Casauriense written by the monks of the Abbey of San Clemente a Casauria, which mentions Tocco for the first time in 872 as a curtis that was bought by the first abbot of San Clemente, named Romano, thus bringing that curtis under the jurisdiction of the Abbey. In the Chronicon it is recorded that the economy of the curtis of Tocco was predominantly agricultural, and the settlement in the 9th century began to gain importance over the settlements on the valley floor (including the one that had continuity with ancient Interpromium).

The emergence of the village of Tocco is linked to the process of medieval encastellation by which local and ecclesiastical lords sought to gain greater power and control over territories, with the territory of Tocco in particular being the subject of disputes between local rural lords of Germanic origin and the nearby Abbey of San Clemente a Casauria, in which the latter saw itself as the target of numerous territorial usurpations. This contention led to the founding of several castles in the area used to assert power over the various territories.

When the Abbey of St. Clement was destroyed by a Saracen raid in the first half of the 10th century, there was a Frank called Lupo, son of an official of Emperor Otto III of Saxony called Ludegerius, who usurped two unfortified settlements (villae) in the Cantalupo area (Note: The Cantalupo area is now on the municipal territory of Tocco da Casauria but outside its town center.) where there were bitumen mines, then a possession of the Abbey, and in 969 he had a castle (castrum) built there.

In 1016 Alberic, Lupo's son, usurped the settlement of Fara Inter Montes (located at the bottom of the Pescara Valley) from the Abbey, also building a castrum there. In the same year he, after forcibly imposing his authority on the local inhabitants, also built a castle in the area of the present town of Tocco. The Abbot of St. Clement Adam II reacted in 1019 with a military operation of infantrymen and horsemen with which he conquered the castle of Tocco, which was destroyed after being set on fire. Following the event, in the same year the Chronicon Casauriense referred to Tocco as a simple villae (unfortified settlement) and no longer as a castrum.

Part of the territory of Tocco was then ceded by the Abbey to Gerard, son of Alberic and lord of nearby Popoli, up to the third generation in exchange for a canon. However, the conflict between the Abbey and Alberic's heirs continued, and in 1024 the abbot of San Clemente, Guido, complained in a letter to the emperor about the usurpation of the curtis of Tocco to the detriment of the Abbey. Between 1025 and 1026 the Abbey managed to repossess several territories in the Tocco area, but possession of the curtis proper remained with Alberic's heirs (Gerard and Theodinus), who fortified it back into a castrum. In 1056 the territory of Cantalupo also returned under the control of the Abbey.

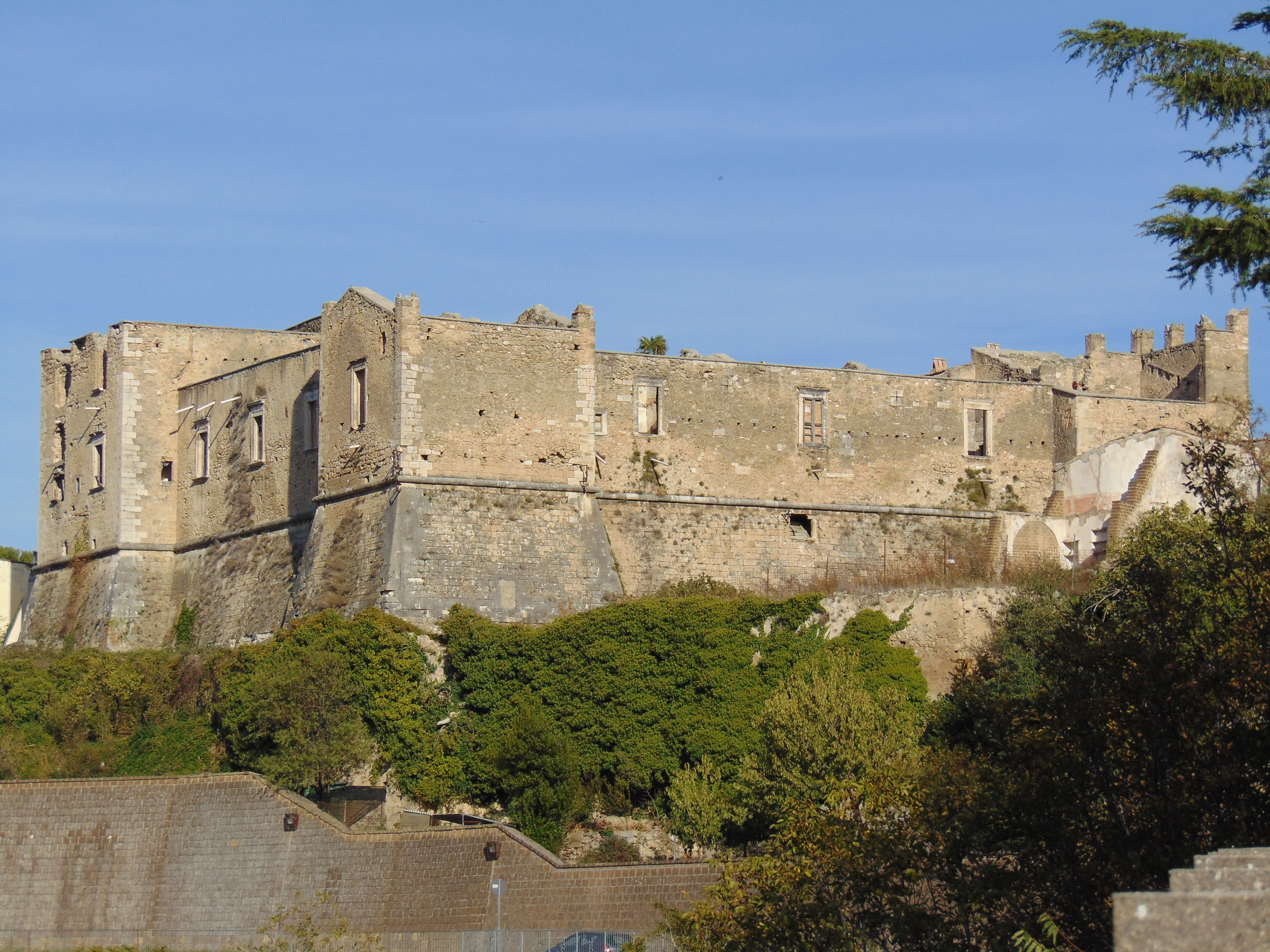
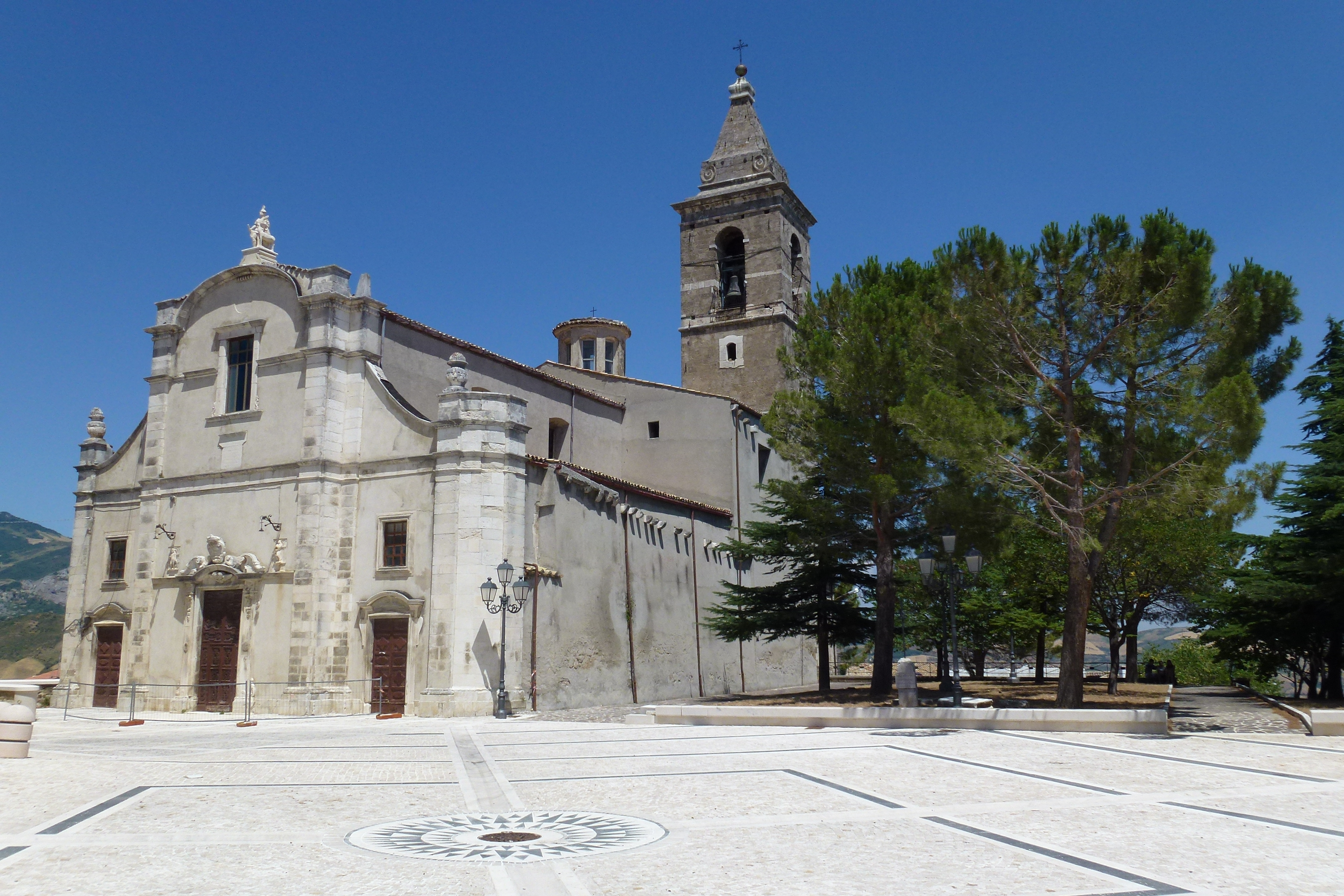
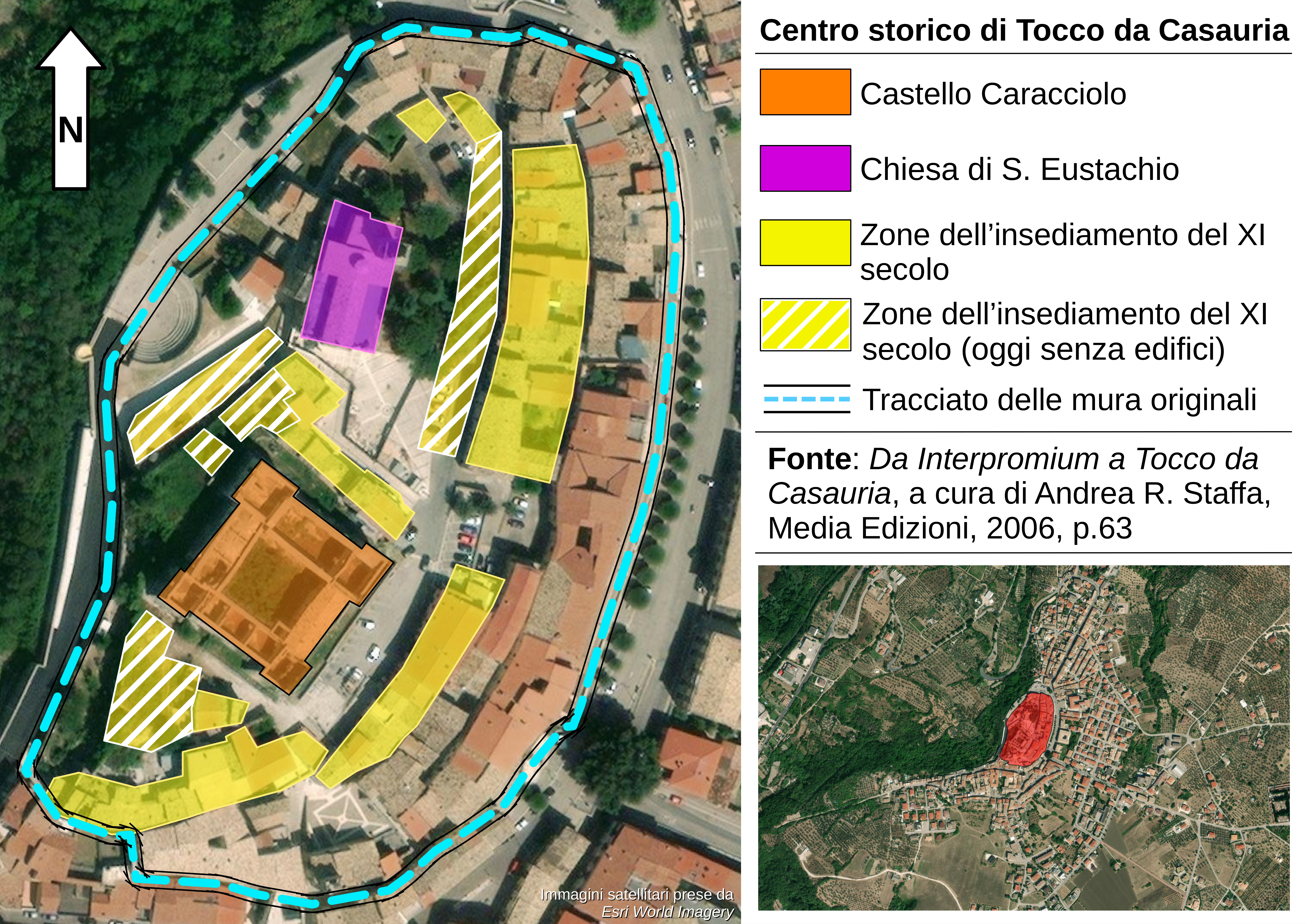
Caracciolo Castle (above left), Church of St. Eustace (above right) and map of the historic center (below)

In 1140 the territory of Tocco became part of the county of Manoppello, and from the 13th century the urban center was developed in stonework around the two most important buildings in the settlement at that time, the church of St. Eustace (whose existence was already reported in the Chronicon Casauriense on July 1, 1169) and the castle (rebuilt at the behest of Frederick II of Swabia).

In 1317 the church of St. Francis (now the church of St. Dominic) was built in the village and the Friars Minor Conventual along with the Third Order Regular of St. Francis settled there.

On September 9, 1349 there was an earthquake in the central-southern Apennines that caused severe damage to the town and killed many inhabitants.

In the second half of the 13th century the County of Manoppello, of which Tocco was part, was fragmented among various feudal lords and control of Tocco went to Matteo de Plexiaco, lord of Manoppello and Pescosansonesco.

== Modern Age ==
The earthquake in south-central Italy on December 5, 1456 killed about 350 people in Tocco and razed much of the town to the ground.

During the First Italian War (1494-1495) Charles VIII of France passed through Abruzzo on his descent into Italy against the Aragonese, and on his passage several towns abandoned their allegiance to the Aragonese and sided with the French, including Tocco.

On December 15, 1578, the Dominican friars officially settled in Tocco in the convent, which no longer exists, of Santa Maria della Pace.

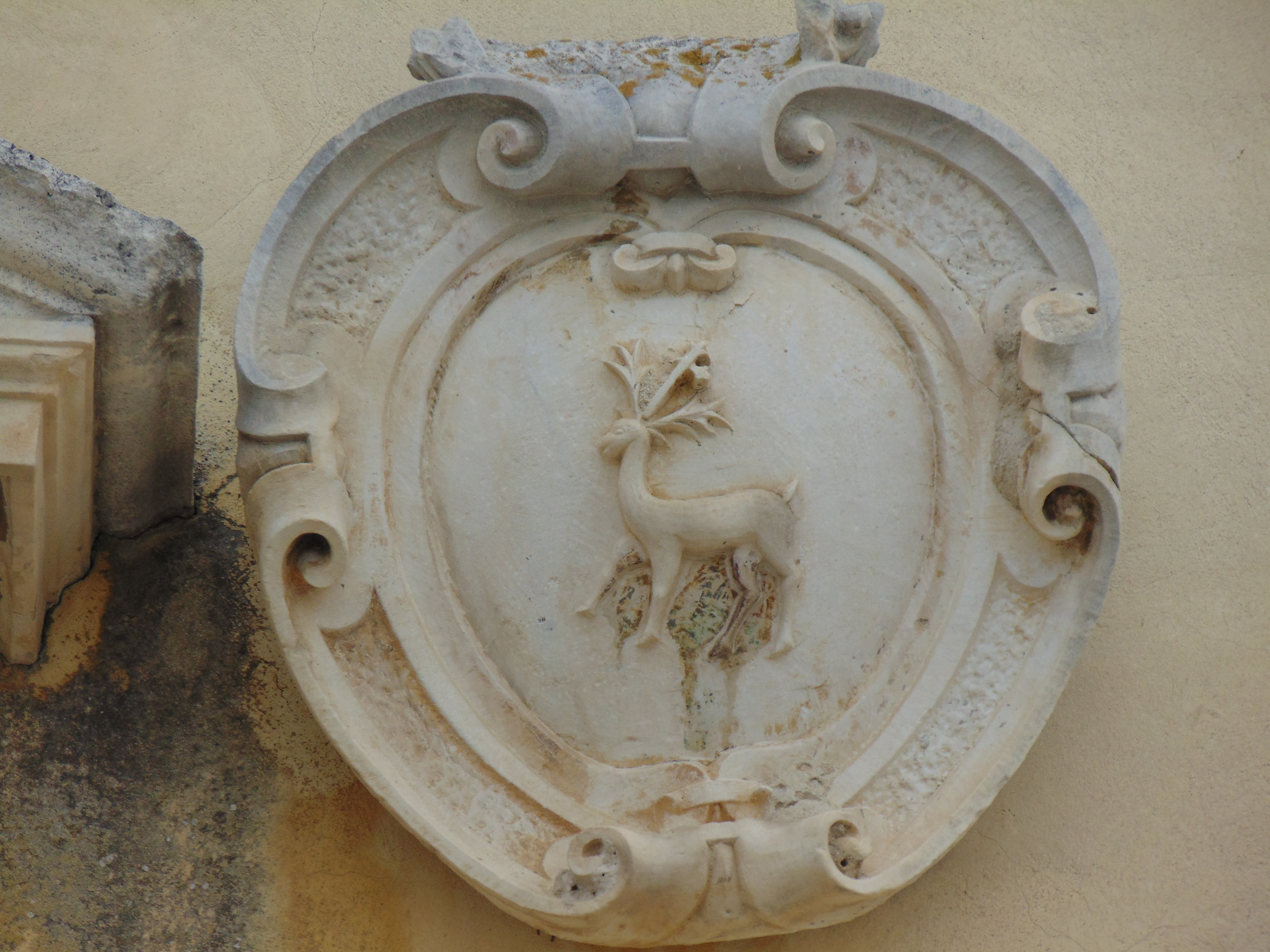
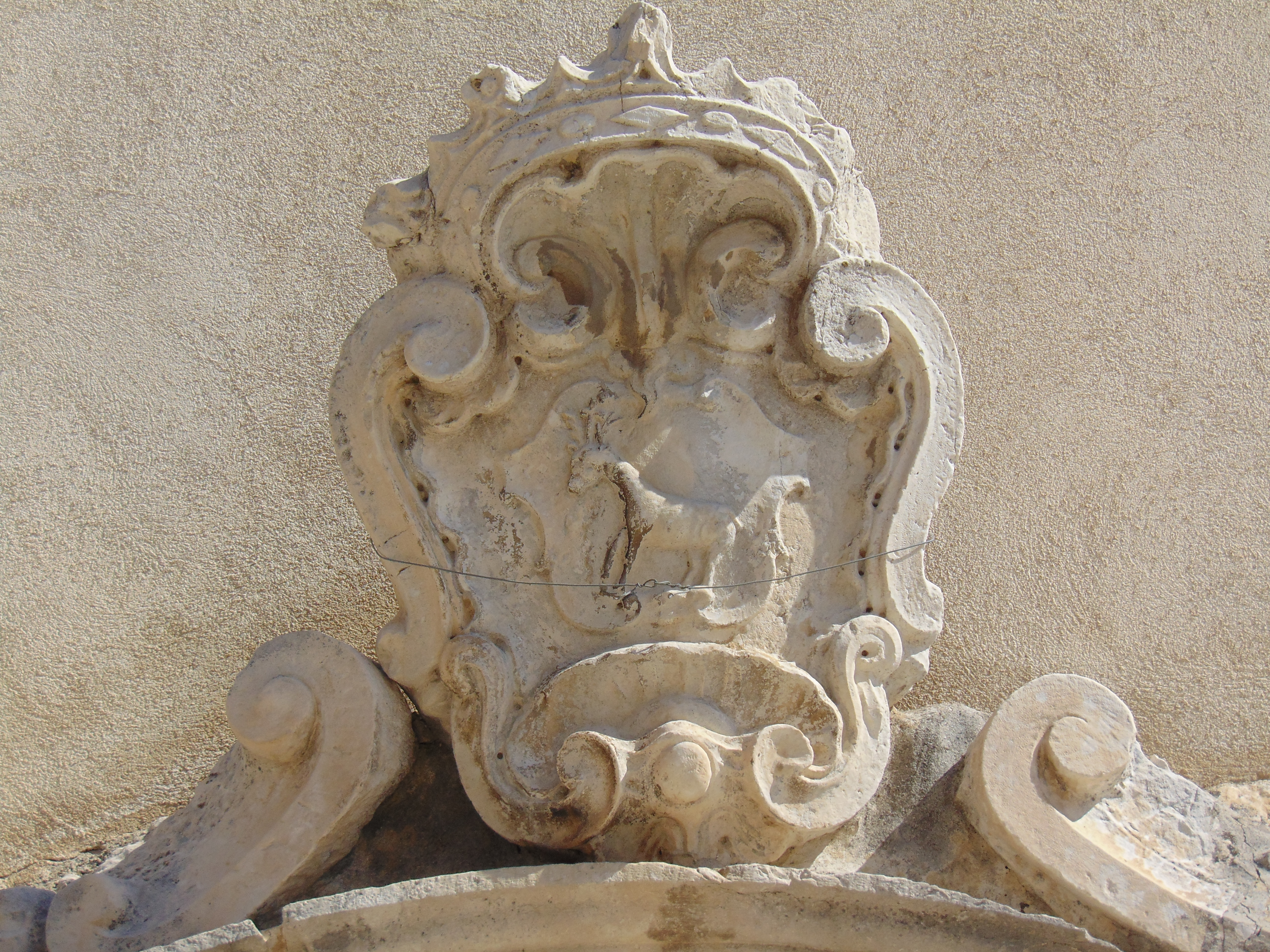
D'Afflitto coat of arms on the churches of Our Lady of Grace (left) and St. Eustace (right) (Note: The coat of arms depicting a deer with a Latin cross between its antlers refers to the tradition of the d'Afflitto family being descendants of Saint Eustace)

Records show that in 1550 the lord of Tocco was the nobleman Camillo Caracciolo, but control of the village passed to Ferrante d'Afflitto, count of Loreto Aprutino, in 1585. During the 1600s, Ferrante d'Afflitto carried out several important works in the village, such as the construction of the convent and church of St. Anthony of Padua for the Capuchin friars and the restoration of the church of Our Lady of Grace and the church of St. Eustace. Later, again during the 1600s, control of Tocco changed again, this time from the d'Afflittos to the Pinelli family, who ruled the town for centuries until the Unification of Italy.

During the plague epidemic of 1656 the town's parish priest Don Gualtieri Mattucci recorded the deaths day by day beginning on August 1, 1656 and ending on January 1, 1657, the day he noted the end of the contagion. The plague of 1656 killed 590 people in Tocco in a population of about 1300-1500.

On November 3, 1706, an earthquake in the Maiella area destroyed much of the town and killed about a hundred people in the village. Among the buildings that were totally destroyed were the Ducal Palace and most of the churches in the village. In addition to the damage to buildings, the earthquake was also the cause of landslides in the village that caused a temporary halt to agriculture in Tocco. The reconstruction of the village took about thirty years.

During the 1730s Tocco was ruled by Duke Francesco Pinelli, who because of his despotic manner of behavior was frowned upon by the people, clergy and local nobility. Some citizens of Tocco therefore wrote a memorial against him to the court of Chieti, which ruled on June 23, 1737, by a decree of King Charles III of Spain, that Francesco be removed from Tocco. Later he was also ordered to appear before the Grand Tribunal of Naples, which confirmed the previous sentence. However, the Duke, after much pressure, managed in 1739 to rule Tocco again and take revenge against those who accused him.

Toward the end of the century, between 1794 and 1795 there was a major smallpox epidemic in the village that killed about a hundred people.

== Contemporary age ==
=== 19th century ===
==== Napoleonic invasion and cholera epidemic ====
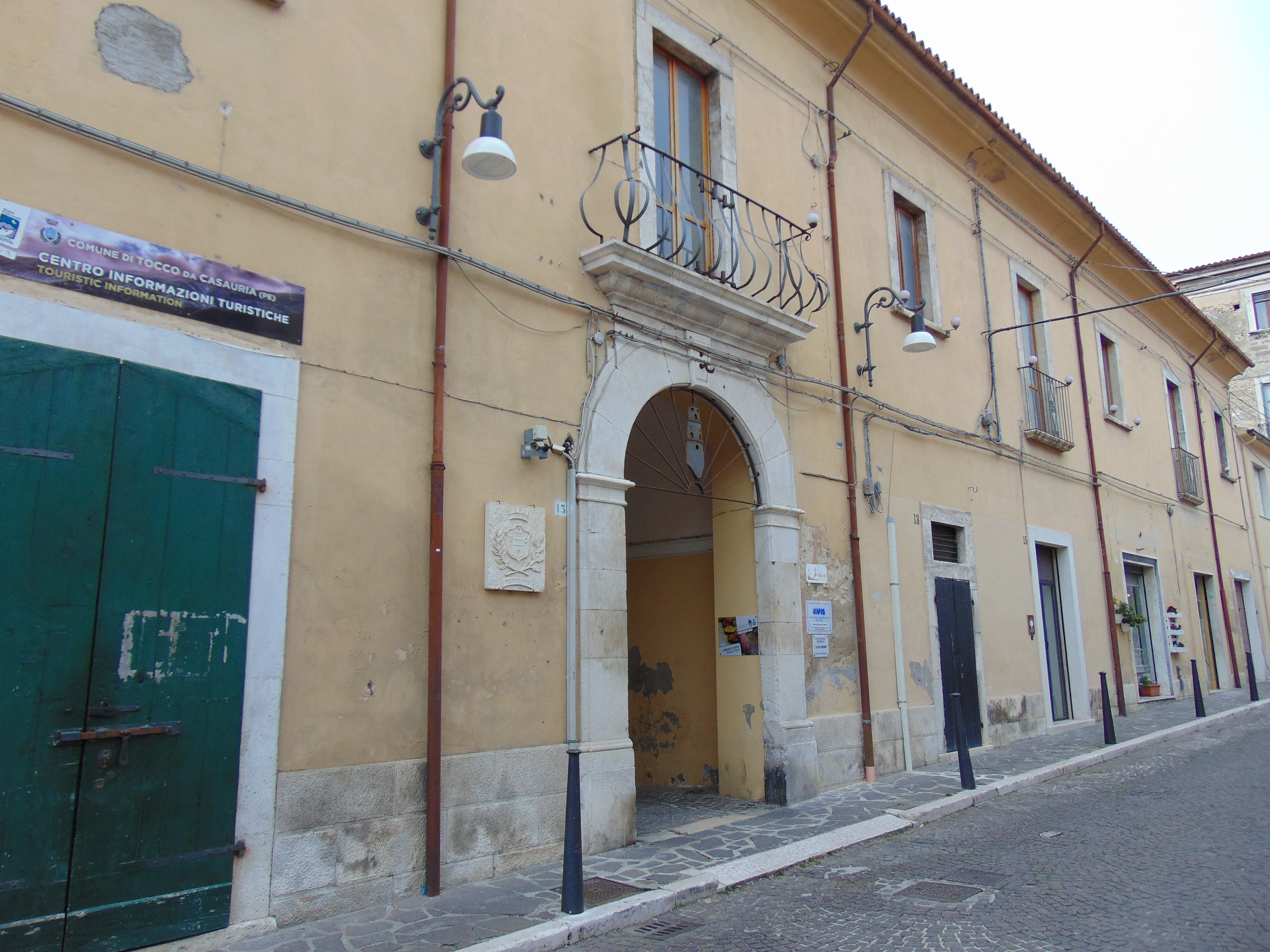
The former Dominican convent remained as the seat of the city hall until the 2009 earthquake rendered it unusable

Following the French invasion of Naples in 1806, a Napoleonic kingdom of the same name was founded with the French victory, and Tocco reentered the Chieti district. Following the French conquest there were the Napoleonic suppressions of religious orders. Convents were also closed in Tocco, and that of the Dominicans was initially used as military barracks for the gendarmerie, but by a decree of December 29, 1814, the property of the former convent was ceded to the municipality of Tocco, which used it to put its offices there. Even after the subsequent French retreat, the former convent remained the property of the municipality and did not return to its old religious function.

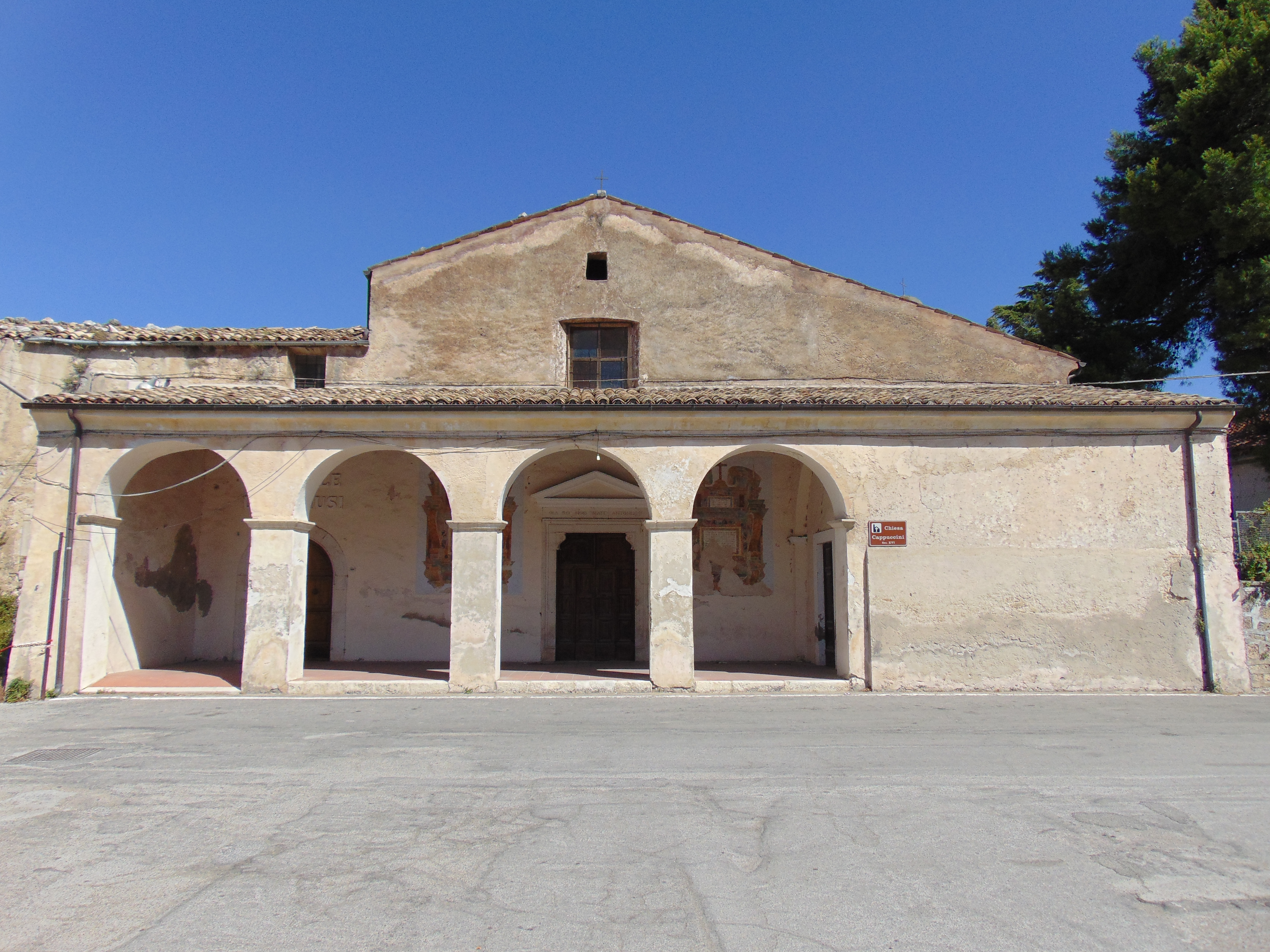
Capuchin Convent

Between 1834 and 1836 a cholera epidemic spread in the Kingdom of Naples, and in Tocco the sanitary commission took precautions in this regard; houses and premises were disinfected with lime and roadblocks were set up within the town. (Note: Roadblocks were set up in the vicinity of the following buildings: church of San Rocco, church of St. Anthony of Padua, church of Our Lady of Grace, church of St. Joseph and Quercelle tavern.) By order of the intendant of Abruzzo Citra in a letter dated September 8, 1836, the Capuchin convent was used as a hospital for cholera patients. Pharmacist Beniamino Toro, originally from Cansano, moved to Tocco in the early 1800s and in 1817 began the business of making centerbe liqueur in his Tocco pharmacy. The liquor's popularity grew during the cholera epidemic as it was used as a disinfectant and remedy for nausea.

==== 1848 ====
In the years leading up to 1848, cultural relations between Tocco and Chieti intensified because of the Tocco people who joined Chieti's political and cultural circles.

On March 23, 1848, the First Italian War of Independence broke out between the Kingdom of Sardinia and the Austrian Empire. In aid of the Kingdom of Sardinia other Italian states also sent contingents of troops, and among them was the Kingdom of the Two Sicilies, of which Tocco was part. Bourbon troops traveling through northern Italy stopped in Tocco in a festive town atmosphere where tricolors were displayed.

On March 15, 1848, riots broke out in Naples and a few days earlier, on May 7, there were violent clashes in Abruzzo at Pratola Peligna between the people and the National Guard. News of the riots reached Tocco and a group of Tocco peasants planned an insurrection in the village for March 20 during the feast of the patron saint. However, Domenico Stromei, a well-known poet in the town, after learning of this warned the lords of Tocco, who sent the gendarmerie to the town. On the morning of March 20, about 20 mounted gendarmes entered Tocco, and when the procession for the celebration of St. Eustace reached the Ducal Palace (the castle), a group of armed commoners arrived ready to start a riot, but the crowd that was already there for the procession did not side with them and instead railed against them. The rioters, therefore, retreated and there were no clashes.

Following the various uprisings in the Kingdom there came state repression, and in May 1849, a year after the failed uprising in Tocco, Bourbon troops arrived in the village to search Stromei's home and store despite the fact that the previous year he had warned the authorities of the planned uprising by the peasants. All the letters in his possession were seized but he was not arrested. In the following years there were other house searches in Tocco for political reasons and 3 citizens were arrested. (Note: The three of them were called Domenico Mattucci, Domenico De Lutis, and Eustachio Santilli.)

==== Unification of Italy and the post-unification period ====
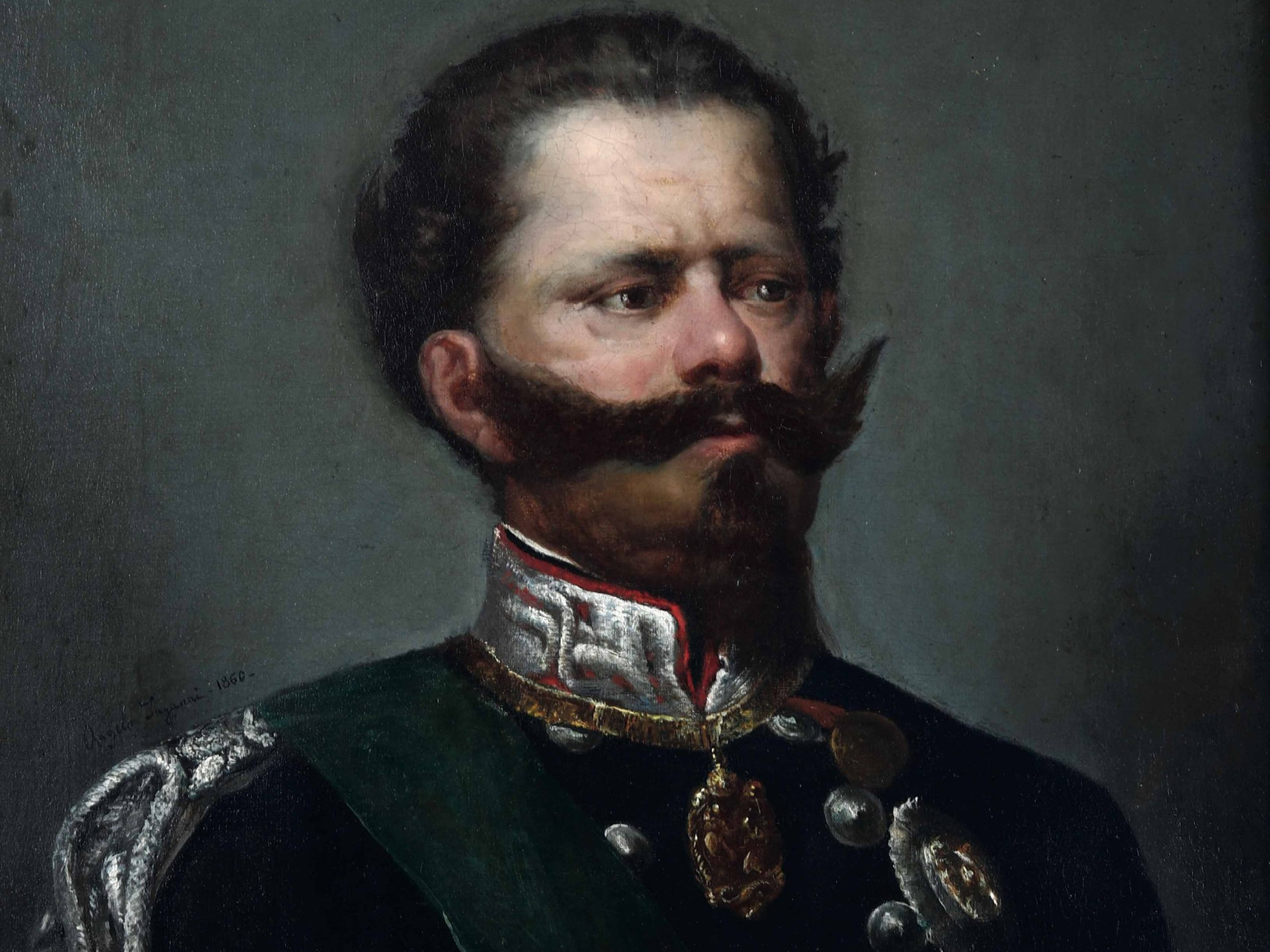
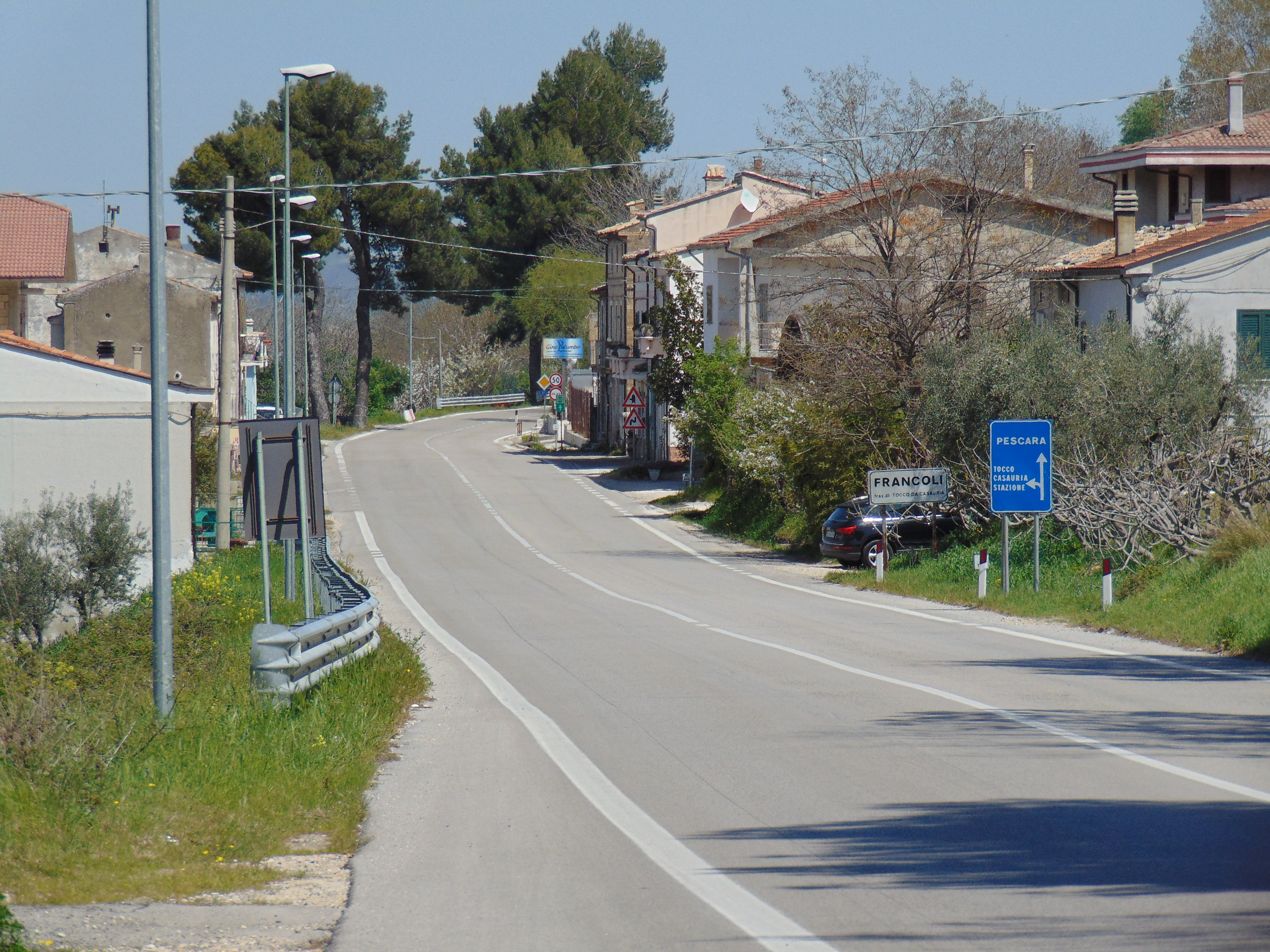
Victor Emmanuel II of Savoy (left) and the hamlet of Francoli (right) where he was greeted by a cheering crowd

In 1860, during the Expedition of the Thousand, riots broke out in Tocco, so the mayor requested the royal authorities to send a detachment of gendarmerie troops to Tocco from Chieti to maintain order. When Victor Emmanuel II of Savoy entered the territory of the Kingdom of the Two Sicilies to meet Garibaldi in Campania, he passed through Abruzzo and on October 19, departing from Chieti on his way to Popoli, he passed over the territory of Tocco in the hamlet of Francoli along the Via Tiburtina Valeria where he was cheered by a jubilant crowd.

After the Proclamation of the Kingdom of Italy in 1861, there arose the problem of having to give a name to the municipality of Tocco to distinguish it from a municipality of the same name in the Province of Benevento. At a meeting of the City Council on November 26, 1862 this was discussed. It was proposed as a name "Tocco di Abruzzo" approved by 6 votes to 1 and "Tocco Tremonti" proposed by the councilman who voted against the other proposal, so a unanimous decision was not reached. In the end, the choice for the decision on the new name was entrusted to the Prefect who established the name "Tocco Casauria" because of its historical and geographical proximity to the Abbey of San Clemente a Casauria, a decision that was finally made official by a Royal Decree in January 1863.

Following the Unification of Italy, there was a dispute between the municipalities of Tocco and Salle, both of which claimed ownership of an area of land between the two municipalities, the "Stazzo di Carnevale," a plateau with a snowfield that was used for both agriculture and grazing. In 1864 the authorities established that the ownership of this area belonged to the municipality of Salle.

After the Unification of Italy, the phenomenon of post-unification brigandage began, which also involved the territory of Tocco; evidence of this can be found in the essay Il Bel Paese written by the geologist Antonio Stoppani, who visited Tocco in 1876 and described in his book the fear felt in the area due to the presence of brigands who carried out raids in the town.

In 1863, the first oil well drilled by mechanical means in Italy (and among the first in Europe) was used in Tocco. This was the work of industrialists Maurizio Laschi of Vicenza and Carlo Ribighini of Ancona, pioneers of mechanical oil extraction.

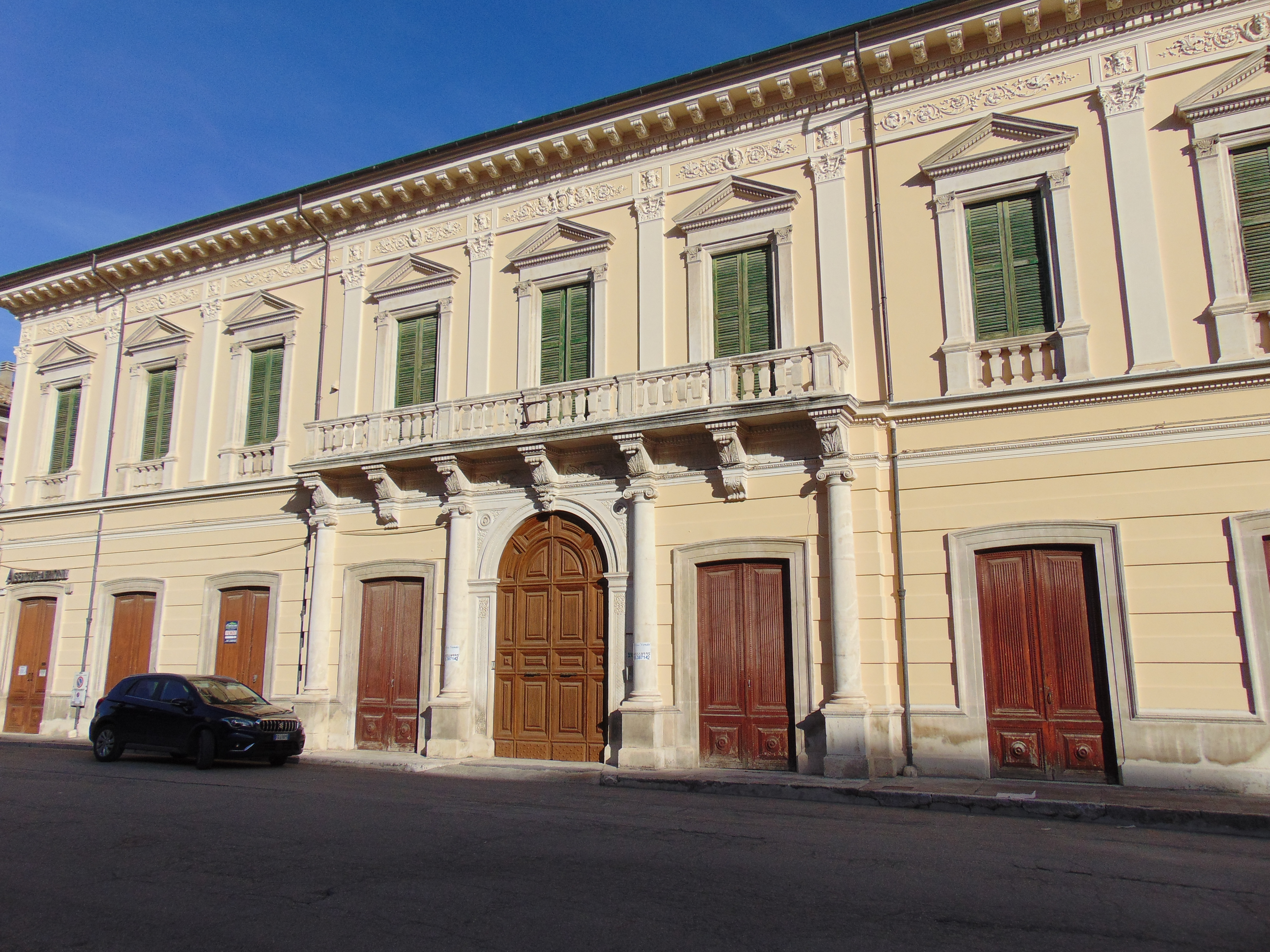
Palazzo Toro

In the mid-nineteenth century Beniamino Toro began to have a palace built in the town for the purpose of using it as a dwelling and centerbe manufacturing plant and it was completed in 1870. Also in that year, one of Abruzzo's first mutual aid workers' societies was founded in Tocco.

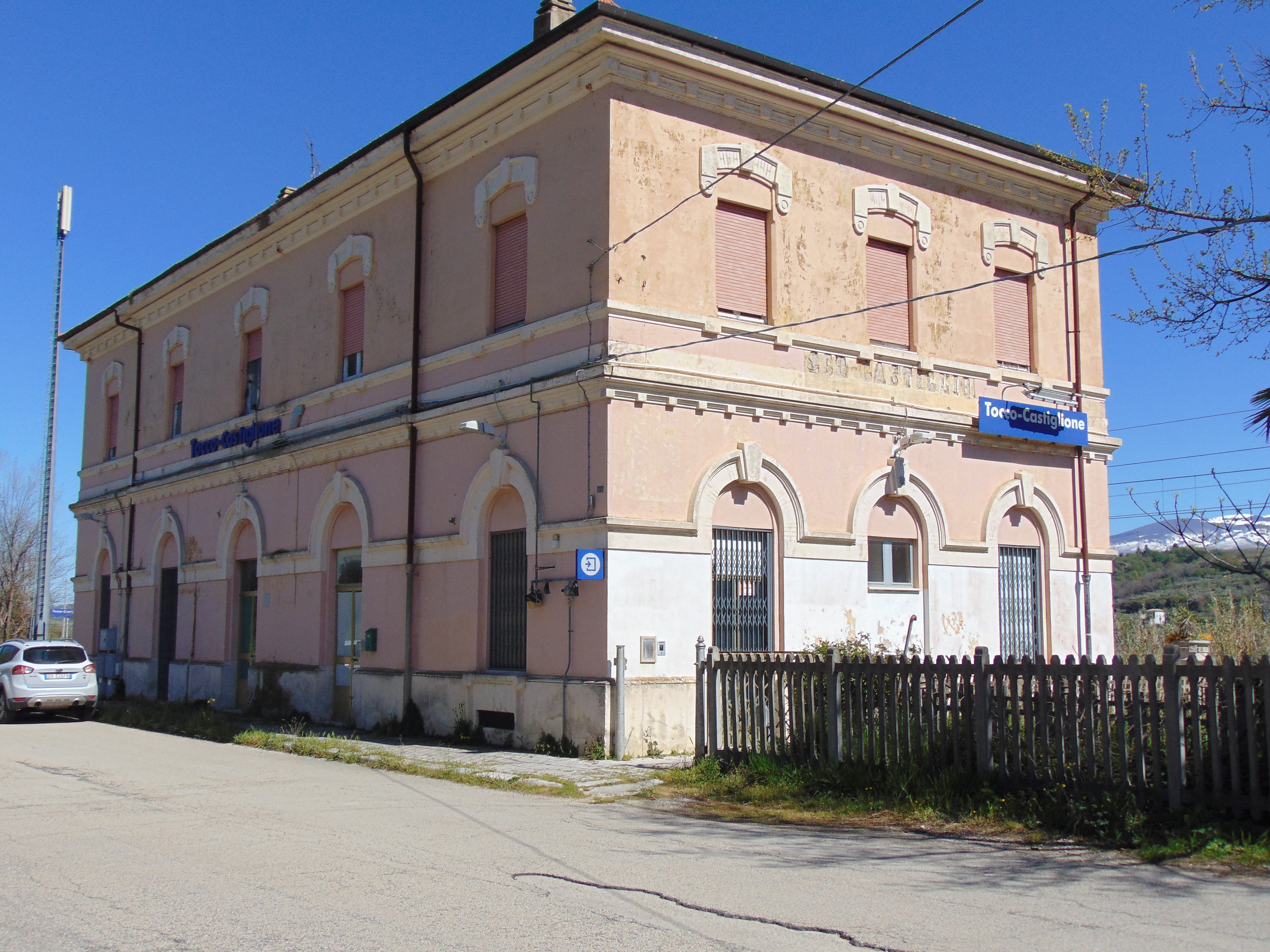
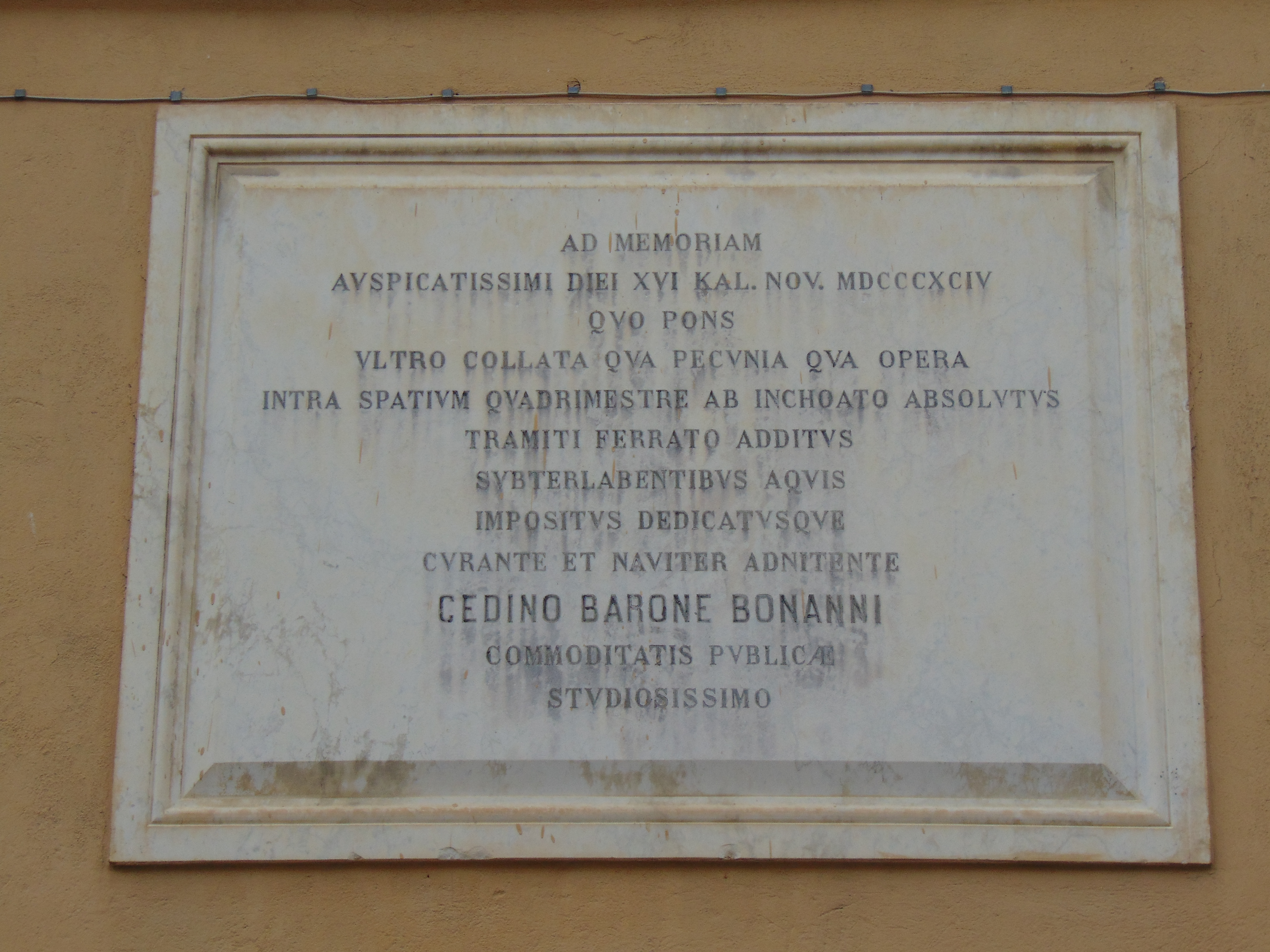
Tocco-Castiglione station (left) and plaque on the historic town hall commemorating its construction (right)

On March 1, 1873, the Pescara-Popoli section of the Rome-Sulmona-Pescara railway was inaugurated. This railway line also passed over the territory of the municipality of Tocco, and as early as 1871 (since before the railway itself was inaugurated) the municipality had been lobbying for the construction of a station to serve the town. It was built only decades later along with a bridge over the Pescara River to reach it and was inaugurated on October 17, 1894.

=== 20th century ===
In 1910, the first turbines were put in place to produce electricity at the Tocco hydroelectric power plant on the Pescara River.

On January 13, 1915, the Avezzano earthquake also caused severe damage in Tocco. There were several collapses, many religious buildings suffered damage and in particular the sacristy of the church of St. Eustace was destroyed. The Ducal Palace also suffered major collapses.

==== Fascism ====
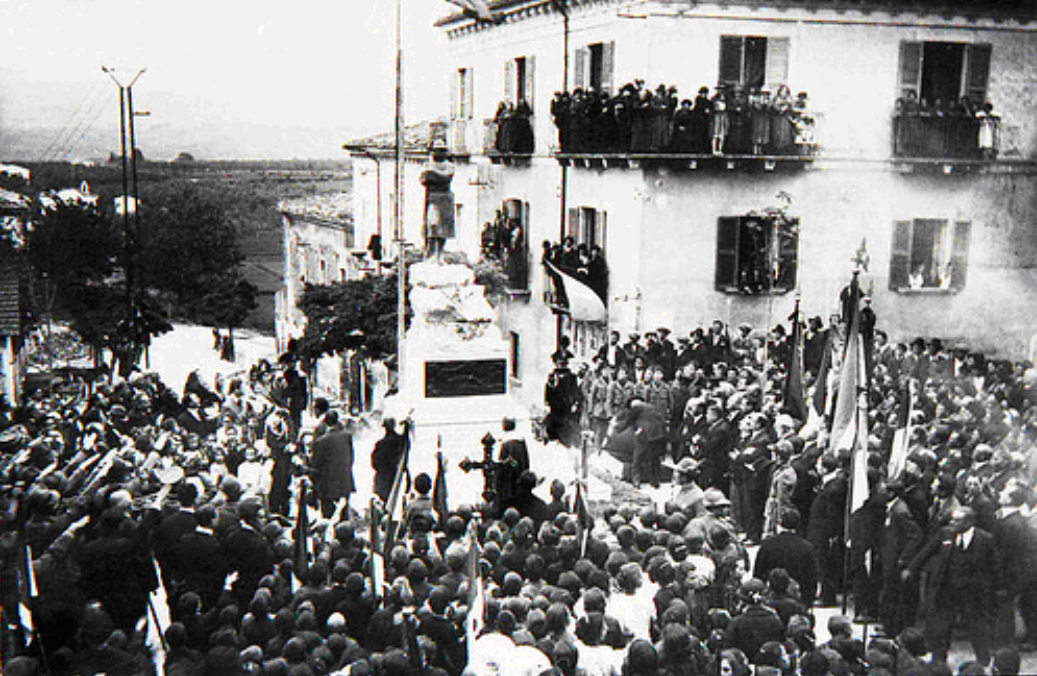
Inauguration of the war memorial, May 20, 1923

Fascism took hold in the village from before the March on Rome, and the phenomenon of squadrismo against anti-fascists involved Tocco as well with some incidents.

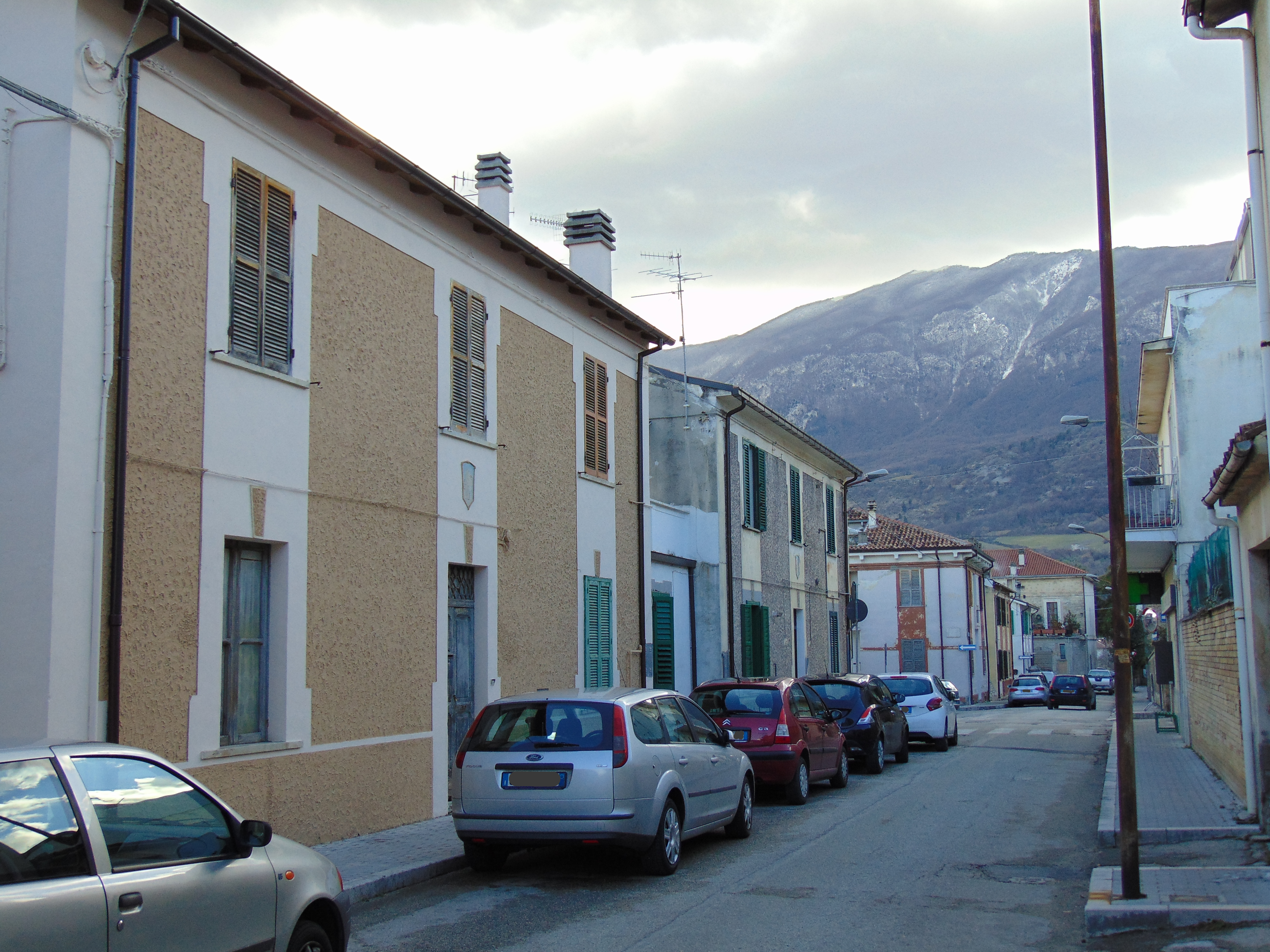
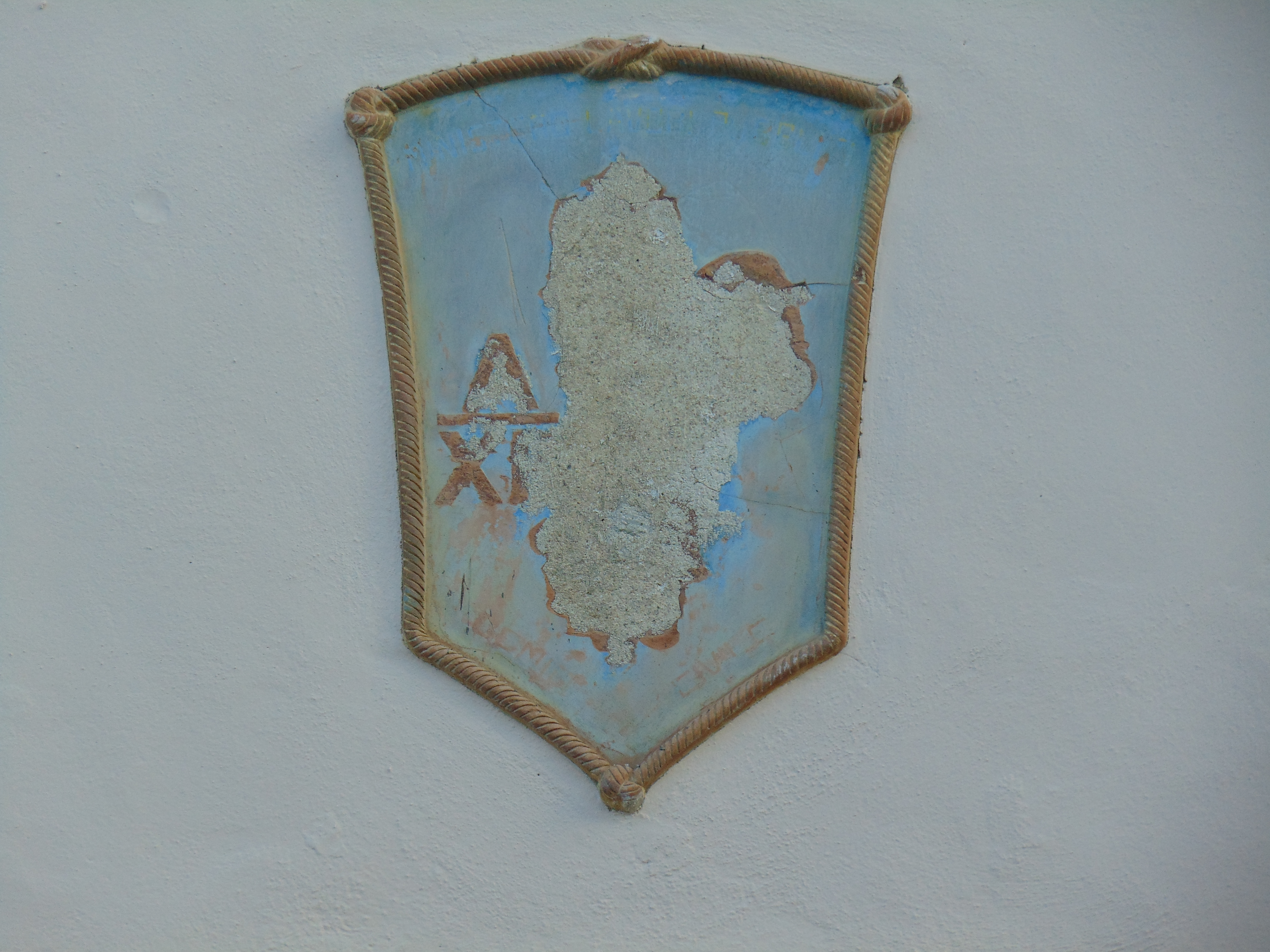
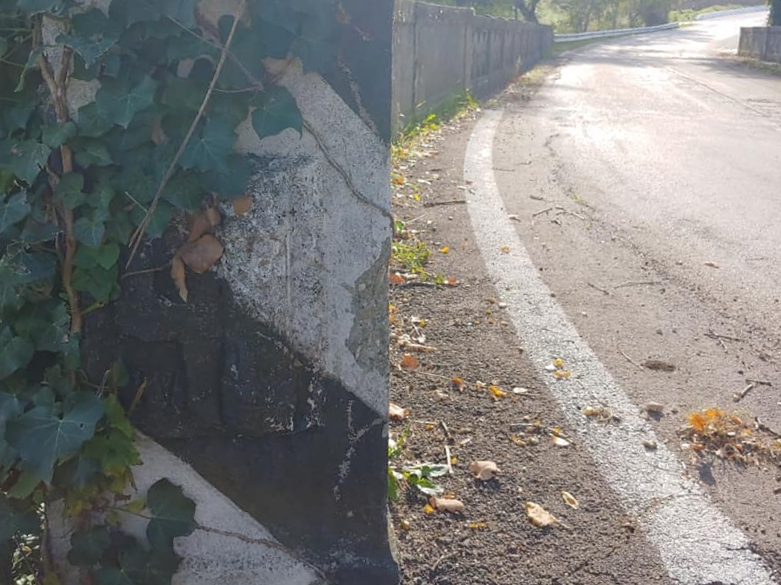
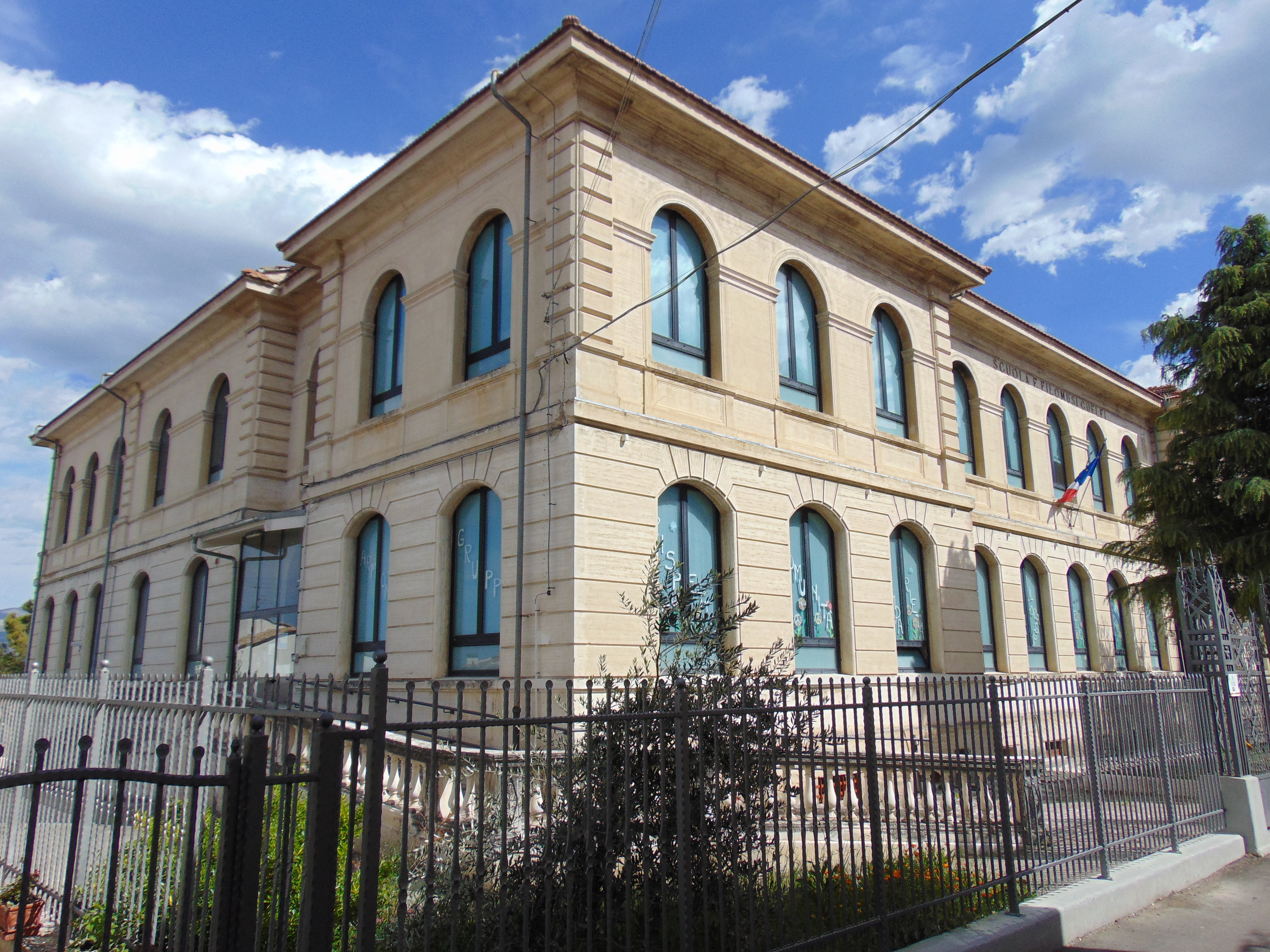
Via Roma and one of the half-erased fasces on the facades of houses in the neighborhood (above), a fasces of the public works department on the Marano bridge connecting Tocco to Musellaro (Note: Marano is a fraction of the municipality of Tocco da Casauria, while Musellaro is a fraction of the municipality of Bolognano. The bridge is located along Provincial Road 67.) (below left) and the Francesco Filomusi Guelfi School (below right)

During the period of the Fascist regime, the urban center of Tocco was particularly developed in the area of Via Roma. Public works were built in the village and there were various restorations of churches and public areas. The town's first school building was also built, the project for which was begun in 1926 with the purchase by the municipality of private land in the area of today's Piazza Domenico Stromei with a view to a future school building that was begun in 1935. In 1923 the war memorial by Torquato Tamagnini was placed and unveiled.

Between 1925 and 1926 the fascistissime laws were enacted, which, among other things, provided that the functions previously performed by the mayor, town council and city council were transferred to a podestà appointed by the government by royal decree, and on April 22, 1927 the installation of the first podestà Giorgio Ventura took place in Tocco.

On January 2, 1927 the Province of Pescara was established, which also incorporated the municipality of Tocco da Casauria, previously belonging to the Province of Chieti.

The Maiella earthquake of 1933 struck Tocco with an intensity of VIII on the Mercalli scale causing some injuries among the population but no deaths. The houses that suffered damage were surveyed as: 38 damaged irreparably, 58 severely and 517 slightly; in total, the estimated damage to private homes amounted to 344,067 liras.

==== World War II ====
During World War II, following the events of September 8, 1943, the Germans settled on the Gustav Line. Tocco, being north of the Line, was occupied and the Germans settled in various public and private buildings in the town. (Note: Among the occupied buildings were the Ricotti Palace, the school (which was used as a military hospital) and the observance convent (which was converted into a slaughterhouse).) After the occupation, Tocco was also affected by Allied bombing: on one occasion the town's hydroelectric power plant was bombed, while on another occasion, on the morning of January 25, 1944 around 9:30 a.m., a single British air force plane bombed the town of Tocco causing civilian deaths and damage to buildings.

On June 8, 1944, the evening before withdrawing from Tocco, around 8 p.m. the Germans blew up a bomb and ammunition depot near the town's train station. The following day they left Tocco at 3 p.m. departing for L'Aquila, and on June 10 Allied troops entered the town. Following the arrival of the Allies, in the transitional constitutional period the parties chose as mayor Beniamino Toro (who previously served as podestà in the village from 1929 to 1943), who administered from July 8, 1943 to September 2, 1944, and was later replaced by Emilio di Donato until March 26, 1946. In the first democratic local elections after World War II, the Christian Democrats won in Tocco with their mayoral candidate Vittorio D'Angelo.

==== Second half of the 20th century ====
In 1954, the birth house of Francesco Paolo Michetti, a famous artist from Tocco, was turned into a house museum.

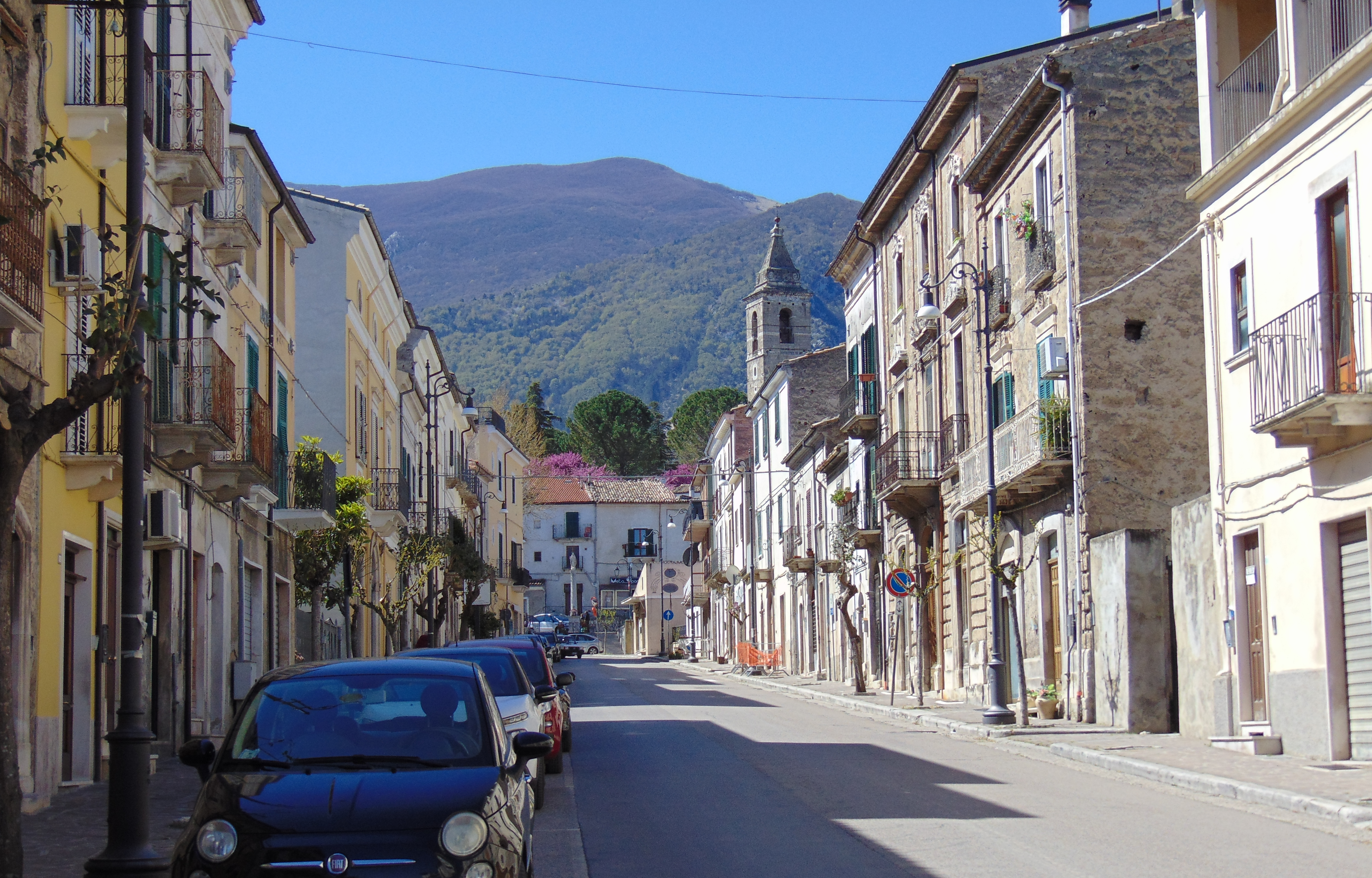
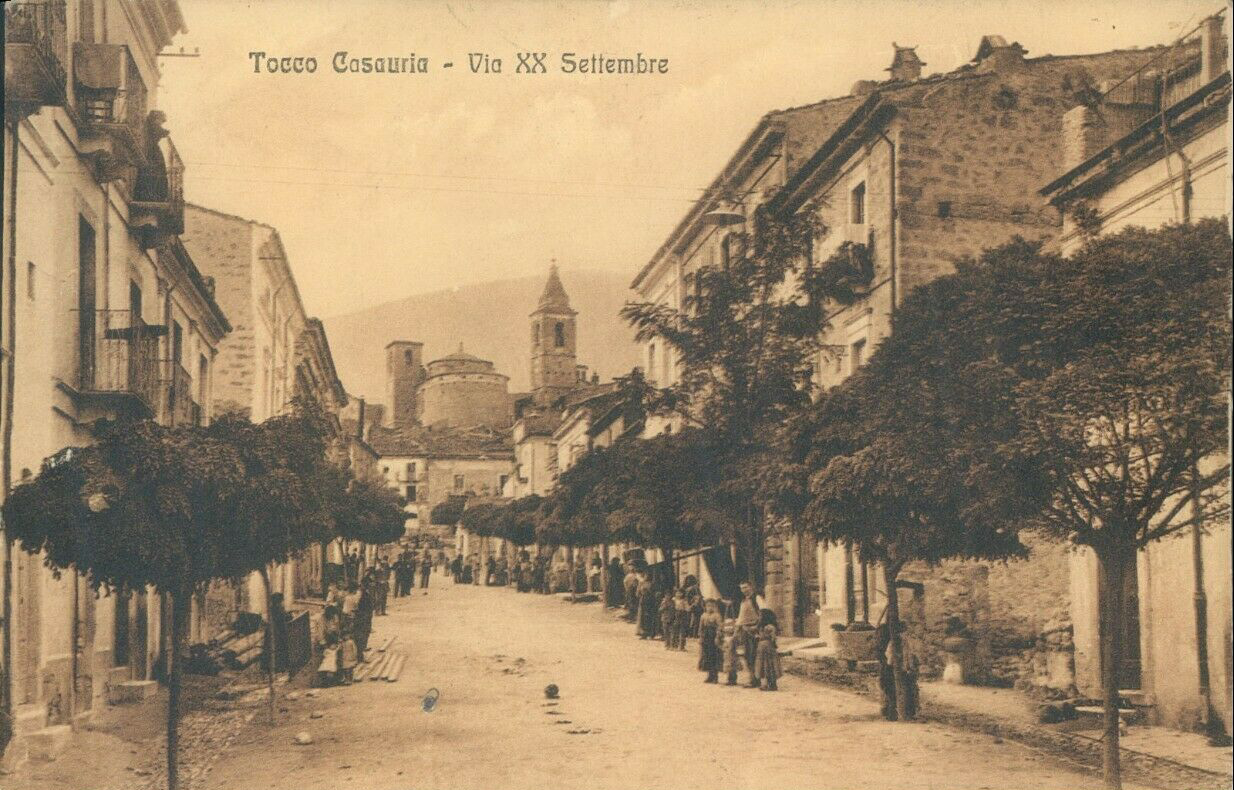
Via XX Settembre, on the left in 2022 and on the right prior to the demolition of the Church of the Mount of the Dead (adjacent to the Church of St. Eustace), which is still visible

In 1960 Tocco underwent major changes in its town center. Due to an ordinance of the public works department, several historic houses on the slope of Porta del Borgo towards the hill along with the Monte dei Morti church were demolished, as they turned out to be buildings still unsafe from the 1933 Maiella earthquake that damaged them. Also in the Porta del Borgo area, the fountain with the obelisk dedicated to Giordano Bruno was demolished, while in today's Via Santa Liberata the church of Santa Liberata was demolished.

On May 7, 1984 there was an earthquake in central and southern Italy that struck Tocco with an intensity of VI on the Mercalli scale. There were 2 evacuation orders and some religious buildings were declared unfit for use.

In 1992 the town's wind farm was established with 2 wind turbines of 200 kW, which would later be upgraded to a total capacity of 4 MW in 2009.

=== 21st century ===
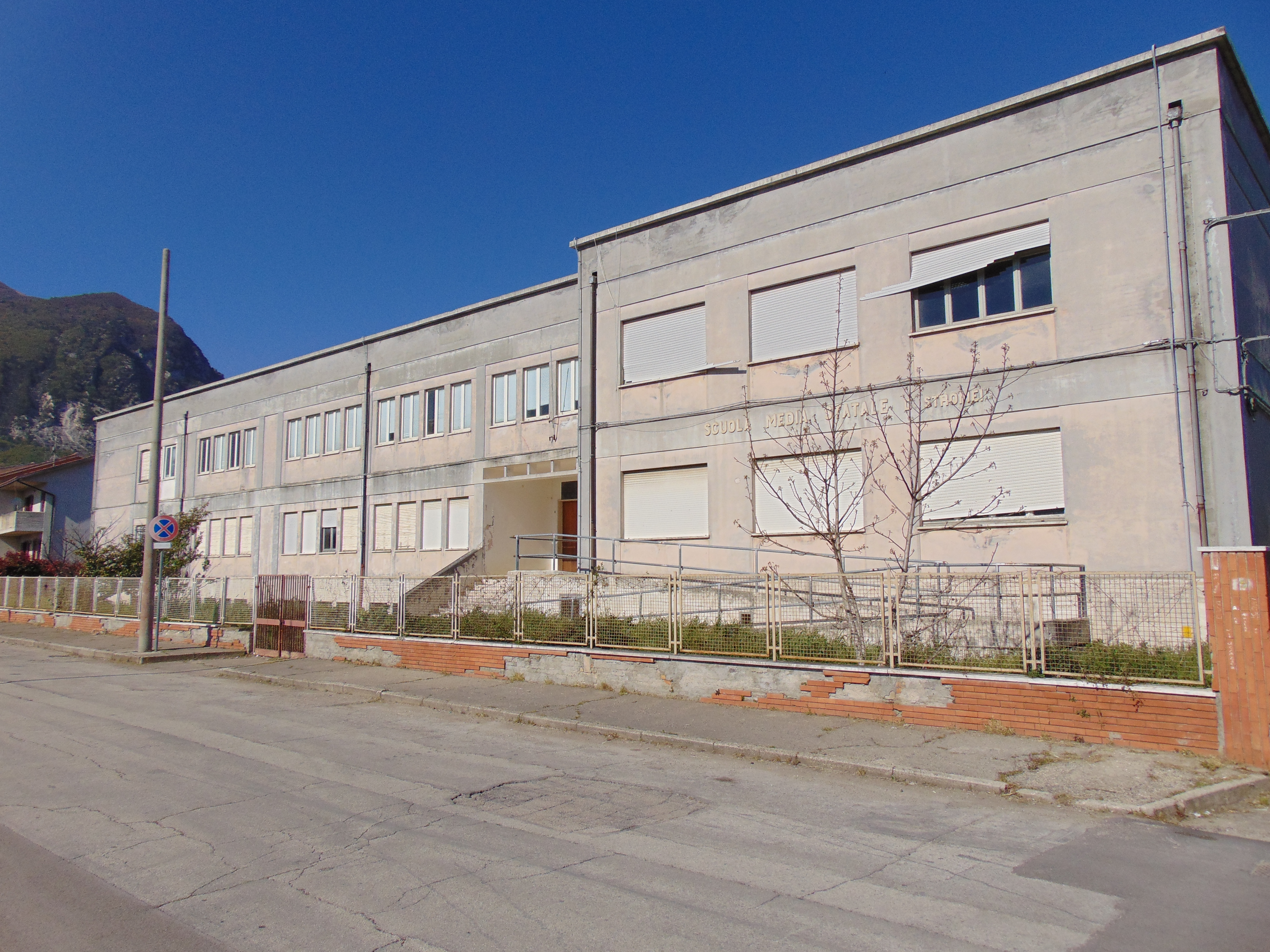
The former Domenico Stromei Middle School

The 2009 L'Aquila earthquake caused damage to several building aggregates and individual buildings in Tocco, including the historic town hall, the Church of St. Eustace and the Domenico Stromei Middle School being declared unusable.

In 2016, earthquakes in central Italy also hit Tocco causing damage in the town.

== See also ==
- Tocco da Casauria

== Bibliography ==
- "Tocco da Casauria, un balcone sulla Val Pescara". Gli antichi Italici nella Valle Peligna. Vol. 59. foto di Luca Del Monaco. Pescara: De Siena Editore. June 2021. pp. 120–137.
- Sandro Sticca (2015). Storia della stazione ferroviaria di Tocco. Centro internazionale di studi e ricerche Il "Melograno".
- Sandro Sticca (2010). Dal census arcaico romano al censimento di Tocco Casauria del 1881. L'Aquila, Roma: Studia Italia.
- Sandro Sticca (2009). Tocco Casauria 1859-1868. Risorgimento, brigantaggio, guardiana rurale. Tipolitografia Sigraf.
- "Tocco da Casauria". Borghi e paesi d'Abruzzo. Vol. 10. Pescara: Carsa Edizioni. 2008. pp. 62–75.
- Andrea R. Staffa; Vincenzo d'Ercole; Marco Buoncore; Elisa Cella; Giovanni di Giulio; Caterina di Nicola; Felice Virgilio di Virgilio; Alberta Martellone; Viviana Merlino; Roberta Odoari; Simona Romano; Manuela Rosati (2006). Andrea R. Staffa (ed.). Da Interpromium a Tocco da Casauria (PDF). Media Edizioni.
- Gerardo Massimi (2002). Tocco da Casauria. Un profilo geografico (PDF). Pescara. Archived from the original (PDF) on 15 January 2021.
- Felice Virgilio di Virgilio (September 1998). Tocco Casauria. Storia Arte Tradizioni (2 ed.). Avezzano: Uranographia Editrice Avezzano.
- Gianfranco Pinti (September 1998). Tocco da Casauria tra storia e leggenda. Pescara: (stampato in proprio).
- AA.VV. (1997). "Tocco da Casauria". Il Parco Nazionale della Majella. Guida ai 38 Paesi del Parco. Vol. 2. Pescara: Multimedia Edizioni. pp. 245–249.
- Felice Virgilio di Virgilio (1991). I Francescani a Tocco Casauria. L'Aquila: Edizione Frati Minori d'Abruzzo.
- Sandro Sticca (1995). La chiesa della Madonna delle Grazie. Sulmona: Libreria Editrice Di Cioccio.
- Sandro Sticca (1986). Il convento di Santa Maria del Paradiso a Tocco Casauria. Vol. 9. L'Aquila: Deputazione abruzzese di storia patria.
- Felice Virgilio di Virgilio (1982). Statuto municipale di Tocco Casauria (secolo XVI). L'Aquila: Japadre.
- Samuele Iovenitti (July 1960). Tocco Casauria attraverso i secoli: storia, leggende, tradizioni. Sulmona: Editrice d'Amato.
- Natascia Ridolfi (10 October 2005). Economia di una catastrofe. Il terremoto della Majella in epoca fascista (in Italian). FrancoAngeli.
