= Castello Caracciolo =

Castle in Tocco da Casauria, Italy

Coordinates: 42.2133°N 13.9120°E

Caracciolo Castle
- Castello Caracciolo
- Tocco da Casauria
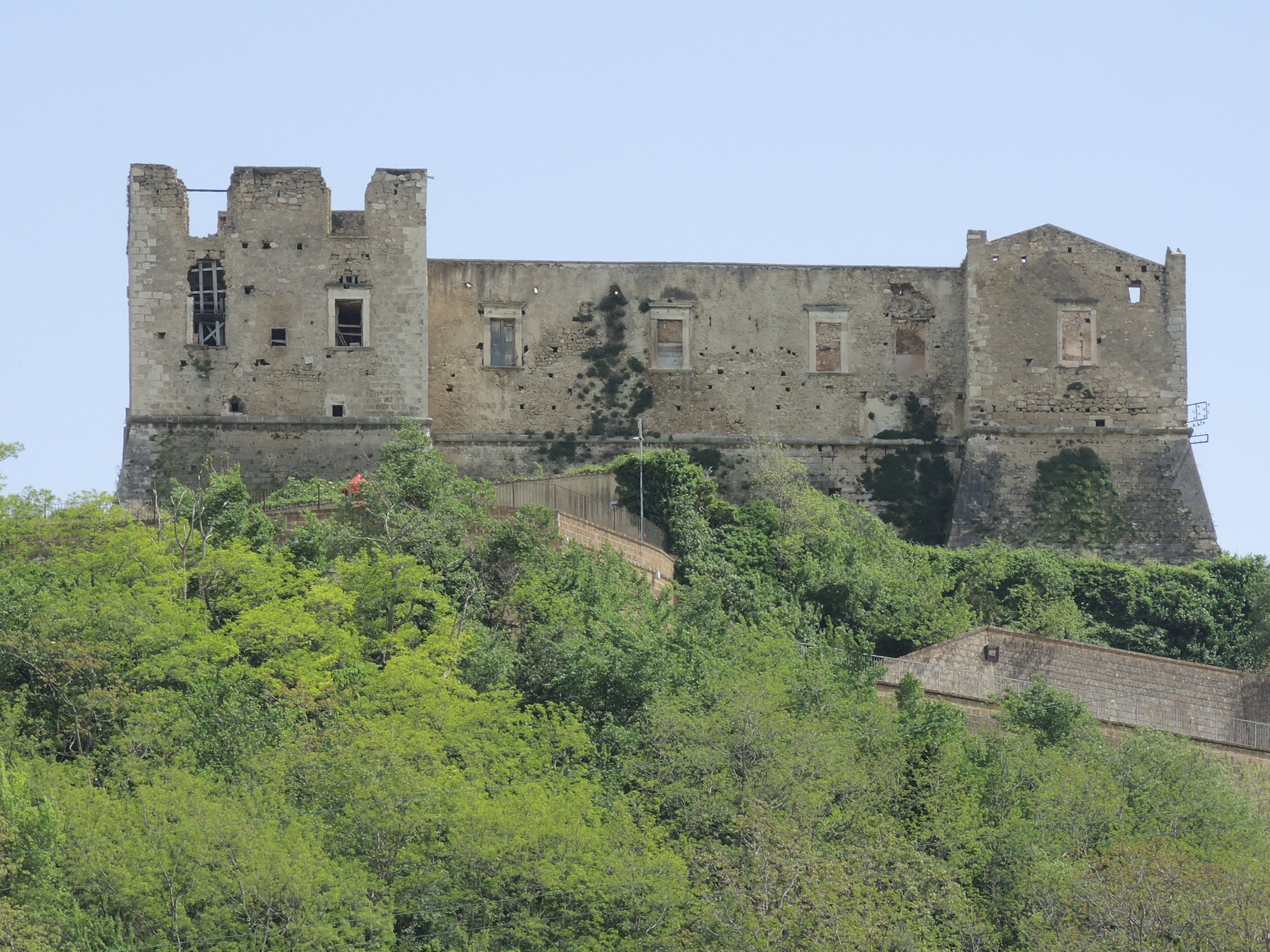
- Castle in Tocco da Casauria

Site information
- Type: Castle

Location

Site history
- Built: 1187

Castello Caracciolo (Italian for Caracciolo Castle) is a Middle Ages castle in Tocco da Casauria, Province of Pescara (Abruzzo).

Constructed between 1000 and 1100 as a military fortification, it was razed by the 1456 Central Italy earthquakes. It was rebuilt in the Renaissance style the following year as a noble residence and became known as the Ducal Palace.

The Palace, now abandoned, is owned by the Municipality of Tocco da Casauria.

== History ==
=== Origins ===
The first historical source on the castle is the Chronicon Casauriense, which cites the event where the heirs of Girardo, lord of Popoli, obtained possession of the Castrum Tocci from the abbot of the Abbey of San Clemente a Casauria in 1016; after conquering all the nearby villages, they built a pharum or tower and also a castle. However, the castle was soon destroyed by the abbot himself, and its ashes were sifted into round baskets called corbelli, which were then scattered over the valley below, henceforth known as the "valley of the corbellari".

=== First Reconstruction ===
The current castle is mentioned by the Chronicon Casauriense, which cites it in other documents dating from 1000 to 1100. The Chronicon also mentions a donation made on July 1, 1169, to Abbot Leonate, drafted in the castle of Tocco and in the Church of Sant'Eustachio, witnessed by a certain presbiter Alesius. Therefore, the castle existed before 1200 and before the reign of Frederick II, contrary to the belief of Francesco Filomusi Guelfi (later taken up by Samuele Iovenitti), who dated the castle's construction between 1215 and 1220.

Frederick II certainly used the pre-existing castle, having it rebuilt as it was strategically positioned for the defense of the entire Pescara Valley. According to Felice Virgilio di Virgilio, the reconstruction of the castle was influenced by two citizens of Tocco da Casauria who were serving at Frederick II's court in Naples at the time: court judge Simone da Tocco and court master of arms Enrico da Tocco. The fact that Frederick II deemed it necessary to rebuild the castle might indicate that the previous structure, after its initial destruction, was only partially rebuilt or was not substantial enough to serve a proper military function.

=== Second Reconstruction and Conversion to a Palace ===
On December 5, 1456, around 3:00 AM, an earthquake with an estimated magnitude of 7.1 struck Central Italy and Southern Italy, also destroying the castle of Tocco. The then lord of Tocco, Giovanni De Tortis, died under the rubble, and his son Antonio, helped by his subjects, immediately began the reconstruction. The castle was rebuilt in 1457 (during the fifth indiction) not as a military fortification, but as a palace residence (in Renaissance style) for the Dukes of Tocco; hence the name Ducal Palace.

In the palace courtyard, there is a plaque commemorating these events, which reads:

ANNO DO(MI)NO MILLESIMO QUADRIGENTESIMO QUINQUAGESIMO SEPTIMO

QUINTA IND(ITIONE) P(OSTQUAM) E TERREMOT(U)
OPPRESSUS FUIT D(OMI)NUS JOH(ANN)ES
DE TORTIS CU(M) TER CENTUM(M) BO(LOGNINIS)
M(A-GNIFIC)I V(IRIQUE) TOCHO LAN(I) I(N) S (TAURAVERUNT) KASTRU(M)
SINE VALLO

SA(N)CTU(S) DE ROCCA

=== From the End of the Middle Ages to the Contemporary Period ===
The castle, transformed into a palace, became the residence of the Dukes of Tocco.

The De Tortis family were Dukes until the end of the 15th century.

In the early 16th century, Francesco Caracciolo became lord of Tocco. At the end of the 16th century, Ferrante d'Afflitto became lord of Tocco, remaining there until probably 1625, when he was succeeded by Duke Francesco Pinelli, from a noble Neapolitan family. The Pinelli family remained in Tocco until the Italian unification, during which their family line became extinct.

In 1706, Tocco was destroyed by the Majella earthquake of 1706, which razed the Ducal Palace, churches, and houses to the ground. The then Duke of Tocco, Cesare Pinelli, survived with his family and began the reconstruction of the town (and the Ducal Palace, which was rebuilt within the following year). Cesare's son, Francesco, was a despot, and the citizens of Tocco wrote a memorandum against him to the court of Chieti, which ordered his removal from Tocco. He was then forced to appear before the Grand Tribunal of Naples, which confirmed the court of Chieti's decision. After much pressure, he was allowed to return to Tocco in 1739. He was succeeded by his son Cesare, who ruled Tocco until the early 19th century. Cesare's heir, Maria Caterina, married Don Antonio Montalto, Duke of Fragnito. Subsequently, her daughter married Duke Don Gennaro Caracciolo of Naples, and thus the palace passed into the hands of the Caracciolo family.

The Caracciolo heirs lived there until after World War II.

Subsequently, the castle, now abandoned, passed from the Scali-Caracciolo family residing in Scafa to the Municipality of Tocco da Casauria.

== Architecture ==
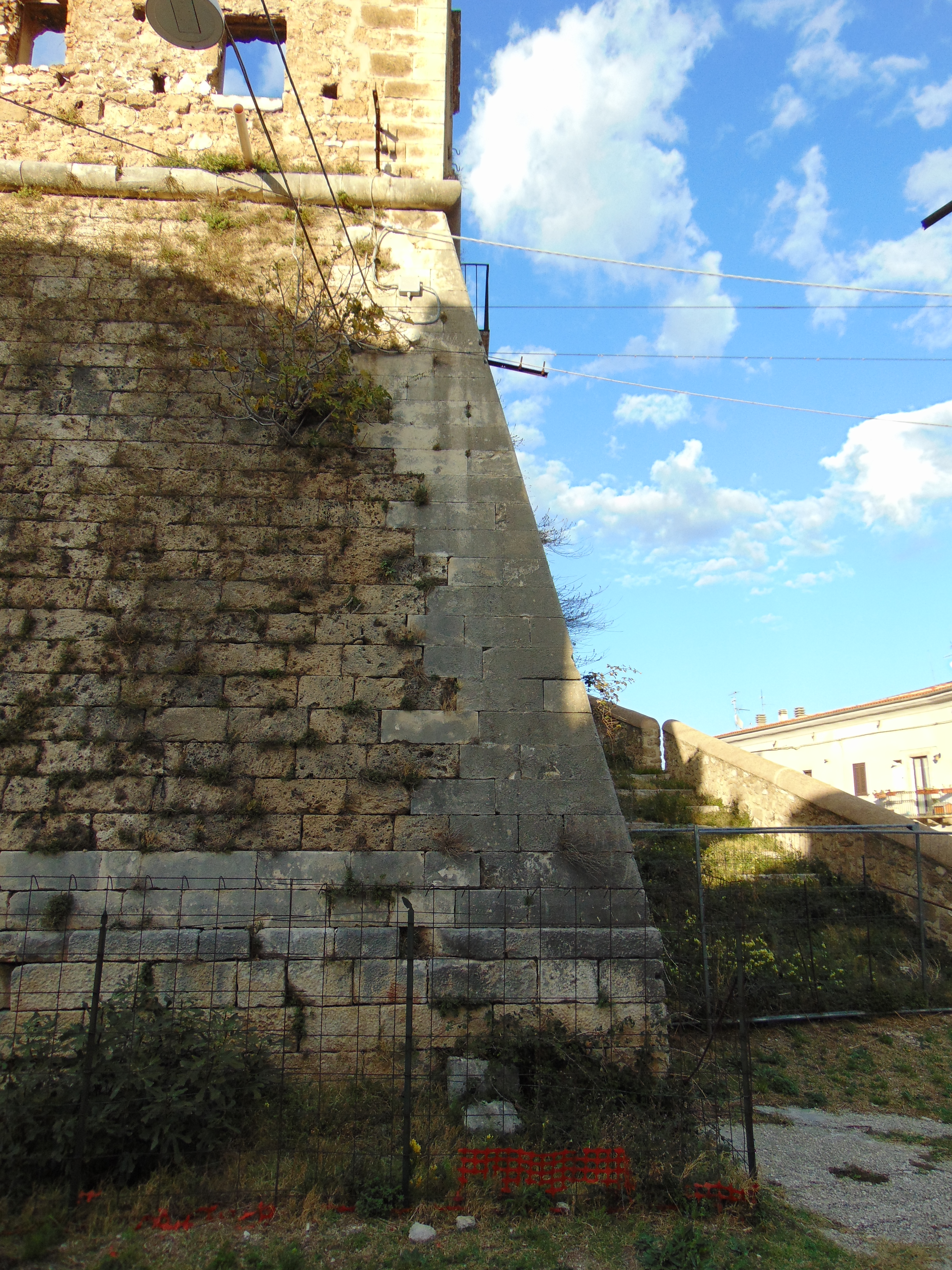
Batter of the left front tower

The castle consists of four wings connected to four square towers at the corners of the building that enclose a central courtyard.

The lower part of the building is made of large blocks of tuff, while the corners and the string course are made of harder, well-squared light gray stones. The upper part of the building, however, is made of brown stones that are almost not squared at all.

The structure has a battered base that reaches about halfway up the building, where a string course separates the batter from the upper part. Along the base are loopholes, while the upper part of the walls has rectangular windows framed by decorated moldings.

The southern tower still has some Ghibelline battlements, which are believed to have been present on all four towers. The eastern tower housed the "Lombard prison." The southeast façade features the entrance portal, characterized by a pointed arch supported by capitals of Renaissance style. To the left of the entrance portal is a staircase, while to the right is an inclined plane for carriages.

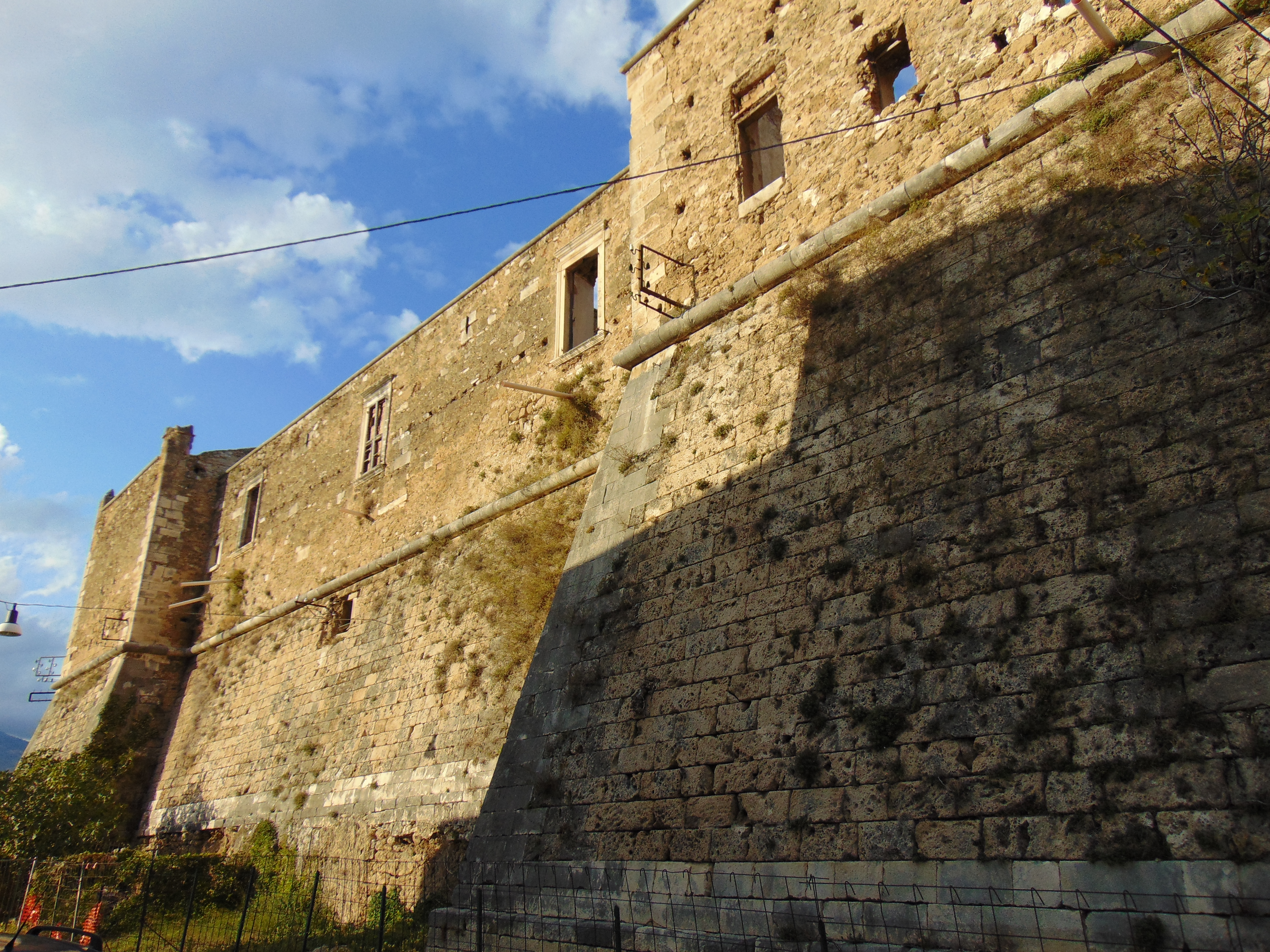
Left façade

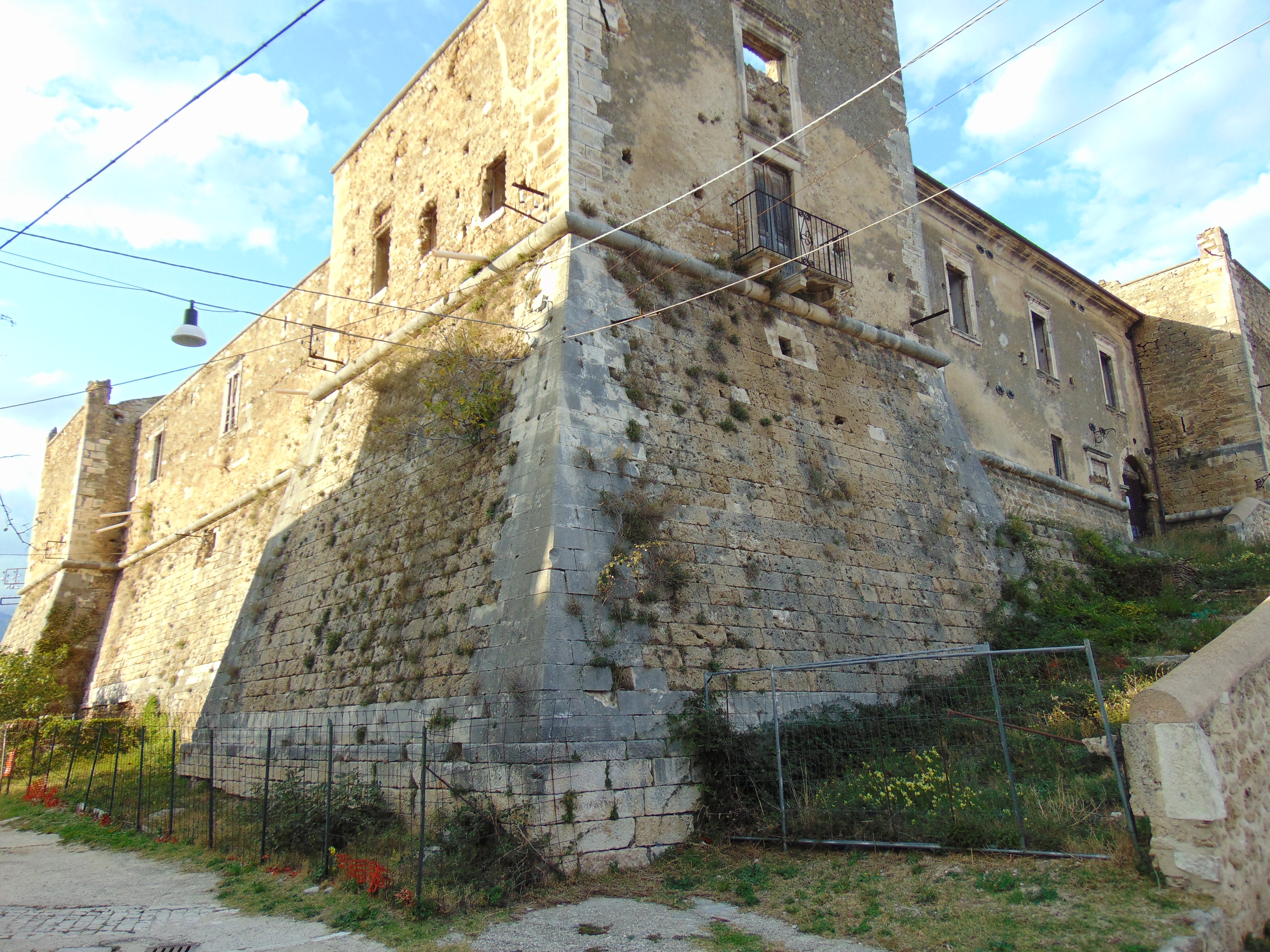
Left and front façades

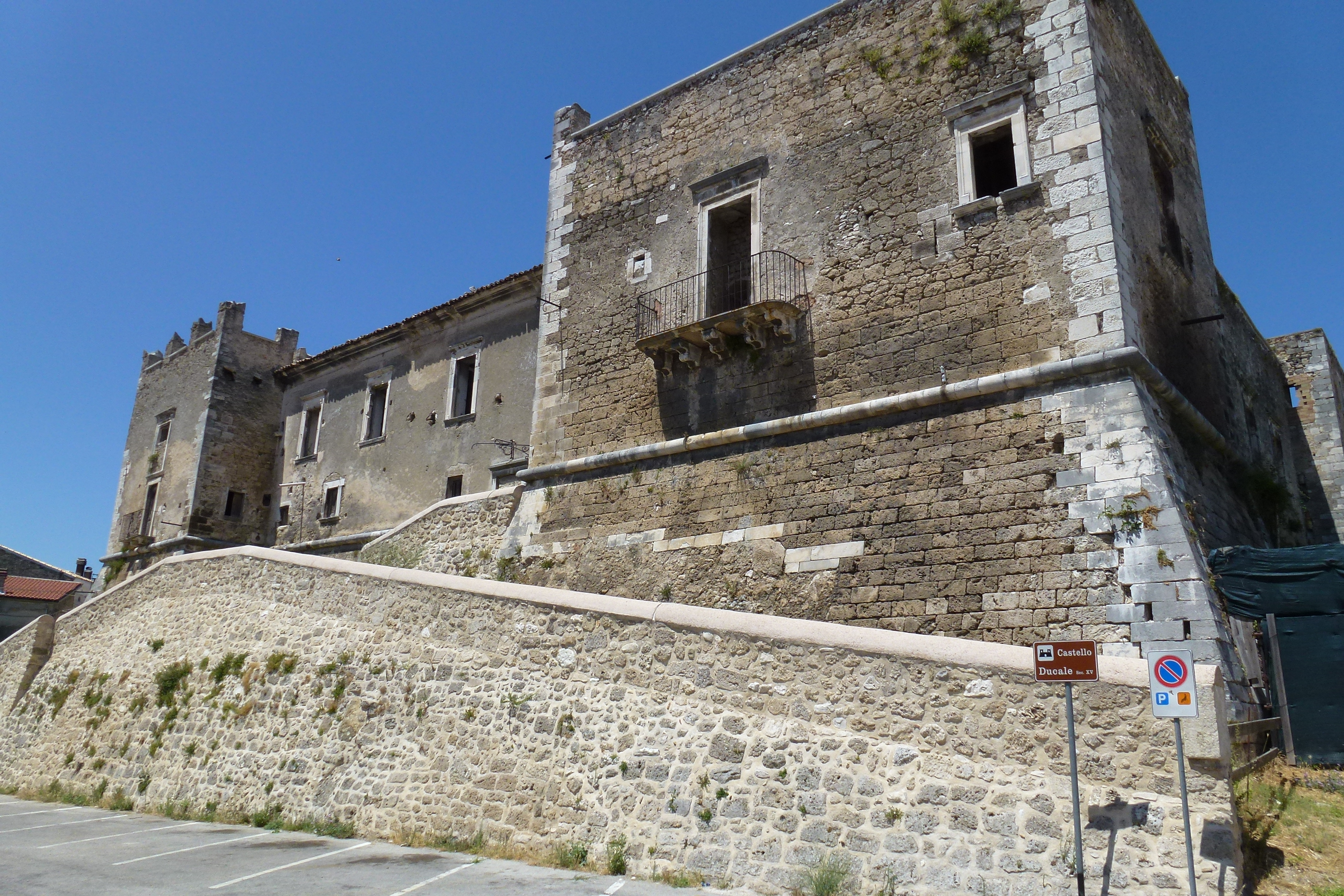
Front façade

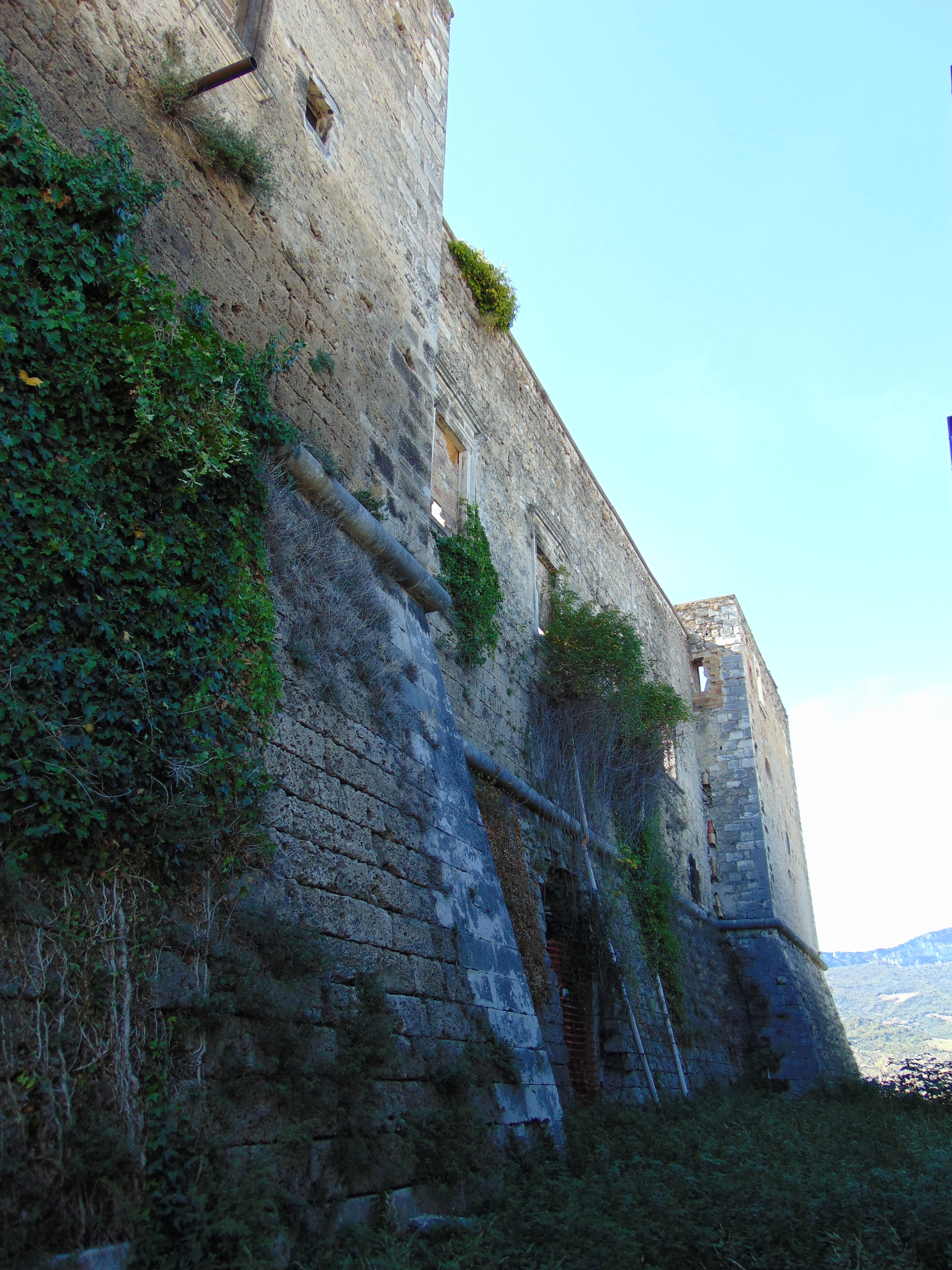
Right façade

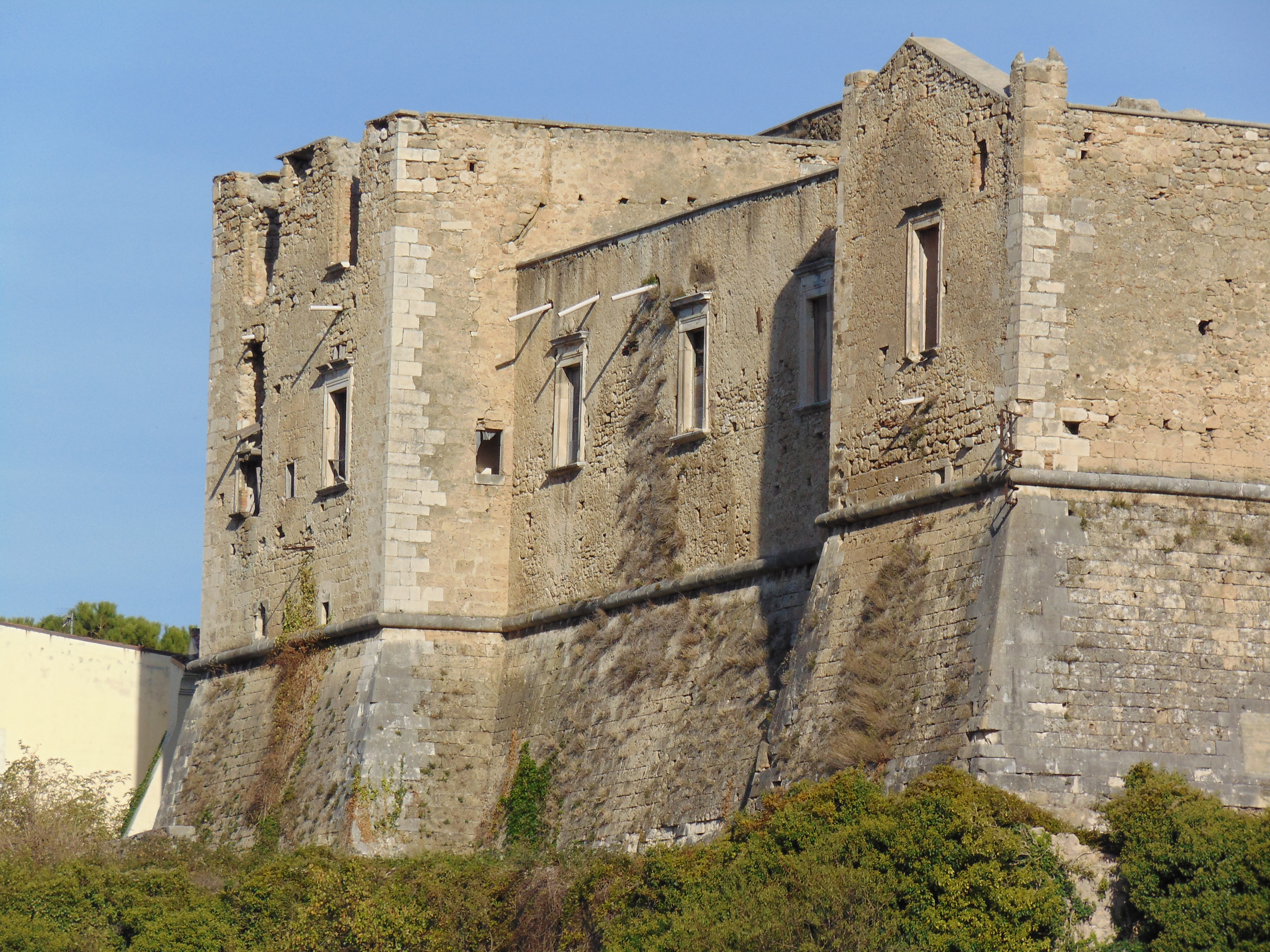
Rear façade
