= Tocco da Casauria =

- Comune
- Comune di Tocco da Casauria
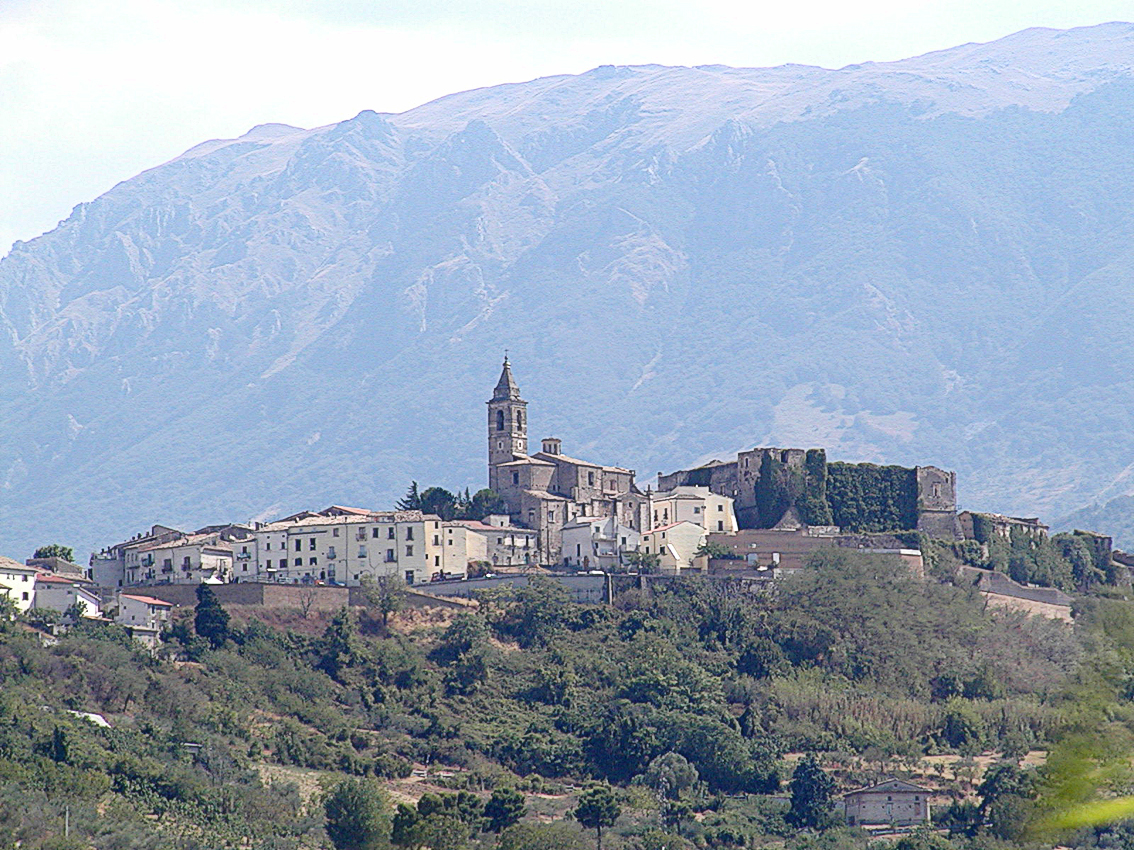
- View of Tocco da Casauria

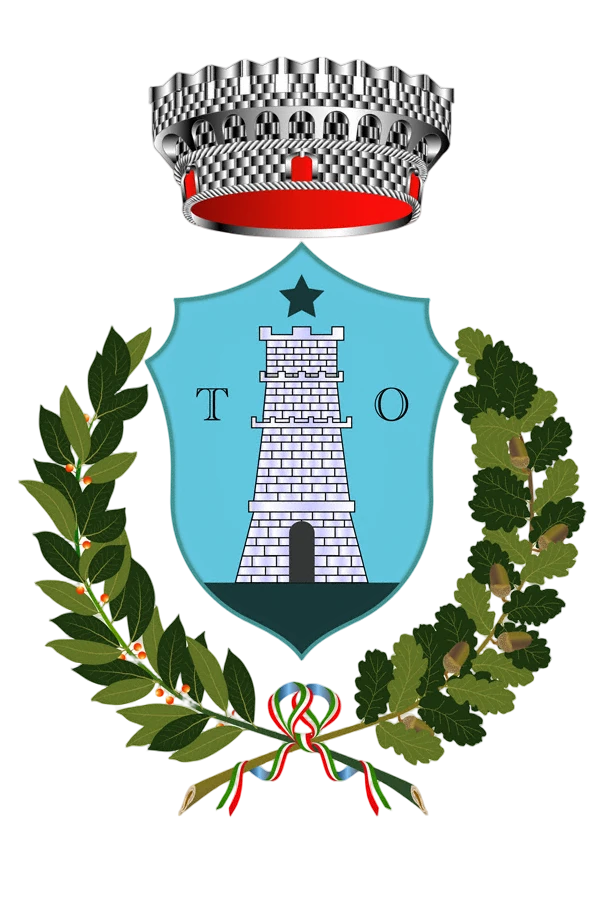
- Coat of arms

- Location within Italy Location within Abruzzo
- Coordinates: 42°13′N 13°55′E
- Country: Italy
- Region: Abruzzo
- Province: Pescara (PE)
- Frazioni: Fràncoli, Marano, Pareti, Rovètone

Government
  - Mayor: Riziero Zaccagnini

Area
  - Total: 29.67 km^{2} (11.46 sq mi)
- Elevation: 356 m (1,168 ft)

Population (1-1-2017)
  - Total: 2,662
  - Density: 89.72/km^{2} (232.4/sq mi)
- Demonym: Toccolani
- Time zone: UTC+1 (CET)
  - Summer (DST): UTC+2 (CEST)
- Postal code: 65028
- Dialing code: 085
- ISTAT code: 068042
- Patron saint: Sant'Eustachio
- Website: Official website

Tocco da Casauria is a comune and town in the Province of Pescara in the Abruzzo region of Central Italy.

The centre was known for centuries as simply Tocco, and the name "da Casauria" was added only after 1861. It rises on a hill between the Pescara river and the Arolle, a small stream, against the background of the Maiella. The town is known for the production of Centerba, a highly alcoholic mixture of Maiella herbs which is said to have healthy effects on metabolism.

== History ==
In nearby Vasto an inscription of the 2nd century BC was found, along with other remains from the Roman empire, which prove there was a Roman settlement in this strategic position between the Gole di Popoli and the valley of the Pescara river. The castle rose in the early 11th century, as shown by a record in the Chronicon Casauriensis: Gerardo di Rocco, lord of Popoli, had in location from the powerful Monastery of Casauria lands and farms in the area, and his descendants decided to come into full possession building there a castle. Then there was a succession of feudal Lords: Boemondo di Tarsia from Manoppello, the De Plesciaco family from Provence, the de Tortis, Caracciolo, d'Afflitto and Pinelli families. Terrible earthquakes in 1456 and 1706 caused serious damage to the historical centre.

== Notable natives ==
- Francesco Paolo Michetti, painter
- Annibale de Gasparis, astronomer
- Henry Salvatori, an American geophysicist, businessman, philanthropist and political activist

== Events and festivities ==
20 September: Feast of Saint Eustace (Sant'Eustacchio in italian).
