= Centerbe =

Italian liquor

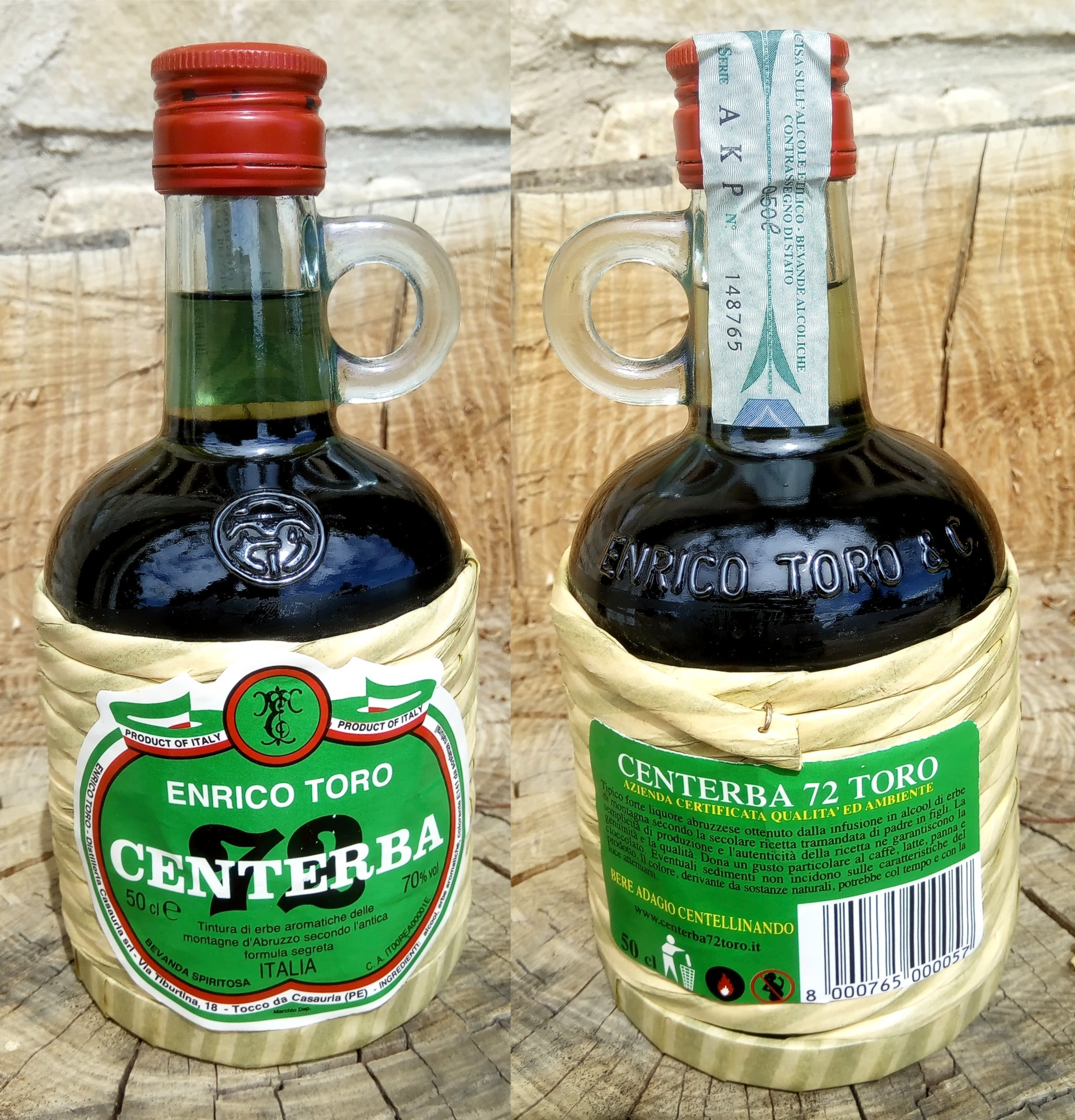
- Type: Amaro
- Origin: Mount Majella, Abruzzo, Italy
- Introduced: 1817
- Alcohol by volume: 75%

Centerbe (Italian: [ˌtʃɛnˈtɛrbe]) or Centerba (Italian for 'Hundred Herbs') is a liqueur made by aromatic herbs commonly found on Mount Majella. It is a typical Abruzzese liquor in central Italy and is made on a base of 70% alcohol. The liqueur comes in two strengths: strong and mild. The strong centerba is widely used as digestif after-meals and has antiseptic properties. It was originally manufactured by Beniamino Toro in Tocco da Casauria in 1817.

It is usually made with 60 to 150 proof (30–75%) alcohol by volume, and can be made by placing orange leaves, basil, chamomile, rosemary, sage, juniper, cloves, cinnamon, toasted coffee beans, saffron, mint, lemon leaves, mandarin leaves, thyme blossoms, and marjoram in a bottle.

"White Unsweetened Centerbe" is an ingredient in the forgotten (presumably French) Coup de Foudre ['Love Struck'] cocktail, included in the United Kingdom Bartenders Guild's '1700 Cocktails' (1934). Verbatim, the recipe is: 1/3 White Unsweetened Centerbe', 1/3 Red Curaçao, 1/3 Coates Plymouth Gin. Serve with a small piece of candied orange peel.

There was a "green and unsweetened" version, as listed in the "Green Devil" cocktail recipe included in the book "Drinks Long and Short" (1925 - Nina Toye and A.H. Adair) also published in the UK. "A potent cocktail, very dry, warranted to wake up any party. Contrary to most cocktails no depression is felt when the effects wears off. This cocktail can be mixed or bottle for use. Four glasses of gin, three quarters of a glass of Noilly Prat Vermouth (Martini Rossi), half a glass of Centerbe, green and unsweetened. Ice and shake well. Serve so cold that the glasses are frosted."

"Unsweetened" suggests that, at that time, a strictly medicinal version of Centerbe was available, perhaps similar to the homemade recipe above without the sugar syrup. Alternatively, many of the 18th century sweet recipes are, to modern tastes, exceptionally sweet. So perhaps standard Centerbe was routinely sweetened to make it palatable. Bols and Grand Marnier both formerly made red curacaos. Coates, then owners of Plymouth Gin, subsidised the publication of 1700, and in return became the gin brand named in almost all the recipes.

== See also ==
- Chartreuse
