= 1706 Abruzzo earthquake =

Earthquake in Italy

- Location within Italy
- Local date: 3 November 1706
- Local time: 13:00 (CEST)
- Duration: 20 seconds
- Magnitude: 6.6–6.84 M_{w}
- Epicenter: 42.076°N 14.080°E
- Type: Unknown
- Areas affected: Abruzzo, Italy
- Max. intensity: MMI XI (Extreme)
- Casualties: 2,400 dead

The 1706 Abruzzo earthquake, also known as the Maiella earthquake, occurred on November 3 at 13:00 CEST. The earthquake with a possible epicenter in the Central Apennine Mountains (Maiella), Abruzzo had an estimated moment magnitude of 6.6–6.84 M_{w}. It was assigned a maximum Mercalli intensity of XI (Extreme), causing tremendous destruction in Valle Peligna. At least 2,400 people were killed.

== Tectonic setting ==
The central Italian Peninsula is dominated by active extensional tectonics, forming the Apennine Mountains. The mountain range formed during the Miocene and Pliocene due to the subduction of the Adriatic Plate beneath the Eurasian Plate. The resulting subduction formed a fold and thrust belt. During the Quaternary, thrust tectonics gave way to extensional tectonics, with the development of a zone of normal faulting running along the crest of the mountain range. One possible explanation for the change in the tectonic regime is slab rollback occurring within the Adriatic Plate as it subducts beneath the Tyrrhenian Sea. Another explanation is because the back-arc basin in the Tyrrhenian Sea is opening at a faster rate than the African Plate is colliding with the Eurasian Plate. Extensional tectonics in the region is mainly accommodated by northwest–southeast striking normal faults.

In the Central Apennines, the zone of extension is about 30 km wide, closely matching the zone of observed extensional strain as shown by GPS measurements. Recent large earthquakes in this area have been caused by movement on southwest-dipping normal faults. The region has seen very destructive earthquakes in its history, including an M_{w} 6.6 in the 2nd century AD, 1706, 1915, 1933, and 2009.

== Earthquake ==
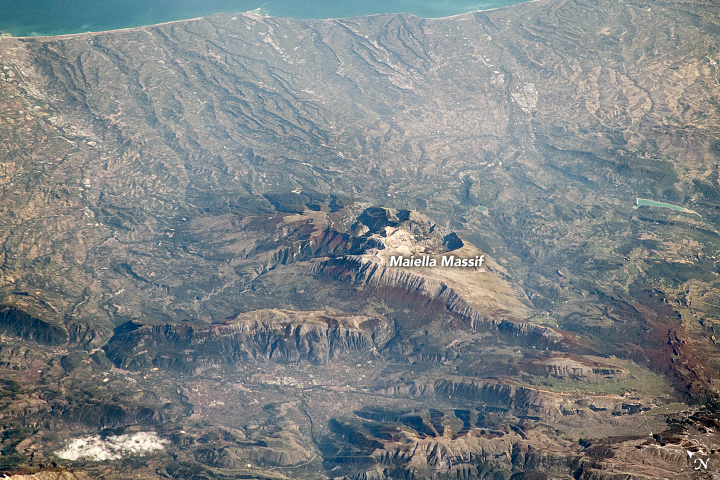
Maiella Massif, location of the earthquake and its source fault.

The earthquake was associated with shallow crustal faulting within the extensional zone on the Italian Peninsula, near Maiella massif. This part of the tectonic zone represents the outermost anticline of the Central Apennines fold and thrust belt. Thrusting resulted in uplift and formation of the massif until the late Pliocene, when extension became dominant. The Caramanico Fault, a 30-km-long normal fault, runs the western base of the massif. Two other faults; the Palena and Porrara faults are situated at the southwestern part of the massif.

The source mechanism of faulting is debated between normal or thrust faulting. A known fault commonly associated with the earthquake is the Porrara Fault; a 20-km-long, west northwest–east southeast trending normal fault located at the southwestern portion of Maiella massif (Monte Porrara). The fault scarp associated with the Porrara Fault is visible for 3 km. However, modelling of the earthquake using its geological and seismic intensity information suggest rupture on a southwest dipping thrust fault at a shallow depth of 5–10 km.

== Damage ==
The 1706 disaster occurred just three years after a series of destructive earthquakes struck the Central Apennines. It lasted twenty seconds but caused massive destruction. A second shock on the night of November 4 caused additional damage and some casualties in areas less affected by the previous one. In total, the earthquakes killed 2,400 people.

The historic city of Sulmona suffered heavy damage, and more than 1,000 people died. This has been inferred by the presence of many buildings, all built in the 18th and 19th centuries. The earthquake effectively destroyed much of the city's architectural heritage. Much of the town of Anversa degli Abruzzi was destroyed, including castles and homes. Serious damage was also reported in Chieti, Lama dei Peligni, Manoppello, Palena, Cansano, Prezza, Raiano, Vittorito, Roccacasale, Salle, Tocco da Casauria, Rivisondoli, Roccaraso, Lettopalena, Lama dei Peligni, and Fara San Martino. In Palena, out of a population of 450, three hundred residents perished. Damage was also reported in L'Aquila. More than 100 fatalities were reported in Gamberale, and the town was destroyed. Five people were killed and 120 were injured in Fara San Martino. At Lama dei Peligni, the death toll was 130, while a further 120 were injured. At least sixty deaths were recorded in Lettopalena and 100 in Taranta Peligna. The abbey of San Liberatore a Maiella and its church were damaged, but restored successfully.

Damage was also reported in the regions of Lazio, Molise, and Apulia. In Cassino and Sora, Lazio, and the wider Apulian region, plaster on buildings fell. It also fell off the Monte Cassino abbey. Many towns in Molise suffered minor to extensive damage, but no human casualties were reported.

== See also ==
- List of earthquakes in Italy
- List of historical earthquakes
