= Santa Maria Assunta, Bominaco =

Church in Abruzzo, Italy

Church of Santa Maria Assunta
- Chiesa di Santa Maria Assunta
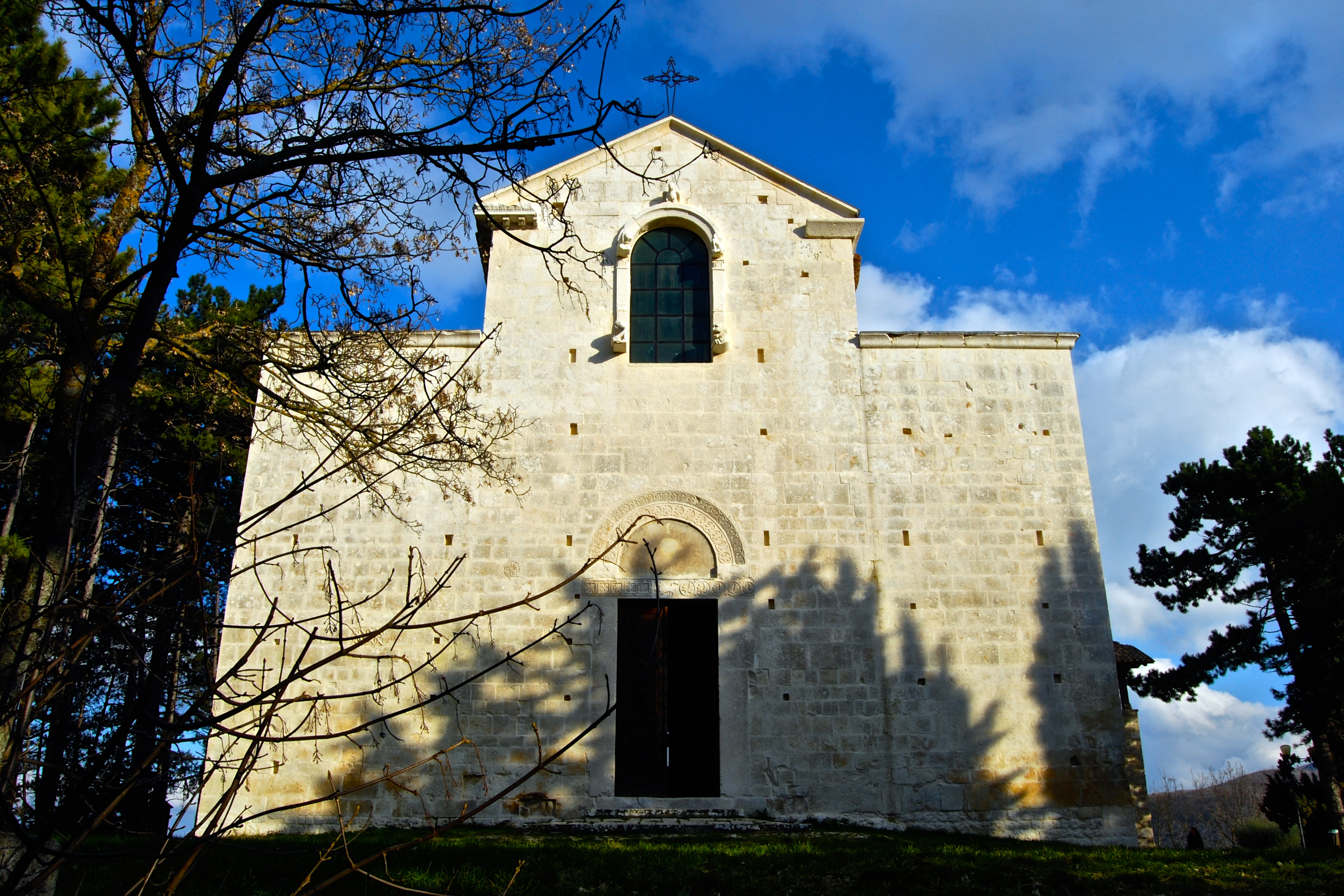
- View of the church

- 42.242828°N 13.660372°E
- Location: Bominaco (Caporciano)
- Country: Italy
- Denomination: Catholic

History
- Status: Church

Architecture
- Functional status: Active
- Style: Romanesque
- Completed: 1233

Administration
- Diocese: Archdiocese of L'Aquila

Chiesa di Santa Maria Assunta (Italian for Church of Santa Maria Assunta) is a Romanesque church in Bominaco, Province of L'Aquila (Abruzzo).

== History ==
The Church of Santa Maria Assunta and the Oratory of San Pellegrino were part of a monastery dating back to the early Christian era when, between the 3rd and 4th centuries, the site became the burial place of San Pellegrino, who was martyred in Bominaco, pierced by lances. The first church was built around the 8th century and was later donated to the Abbey of Farfa, becoming independent again in 1001. The exact dating of the Church of Santa Maria Assunta is uncertain, but it definitely precedes the dates of 1180 on the pulpit and 1223 on the altar.

The first historical references to the church are an imperial diploma from Conrad II the Salic in 1027, a diploma from Henry V in 1118, and a bull from Pope Leo IX in 1051. In these documents, the monastery is referred to as ecclesia sancti Peregrini. In the donation act of Ugo di Gerberto from 1093, however, the church is dedicated to the Mother of God (Deigenetricis) and Saint Pellegrino, suggesting a name change, with the name Maria then appearing in the inscription on the ambo and the altar. Probably following this change, the oratory dedicated to Saint Pellegrino was built. In 1902, it was declared a National Monument of Italy.

== Architecture ==
=== Exterior ===
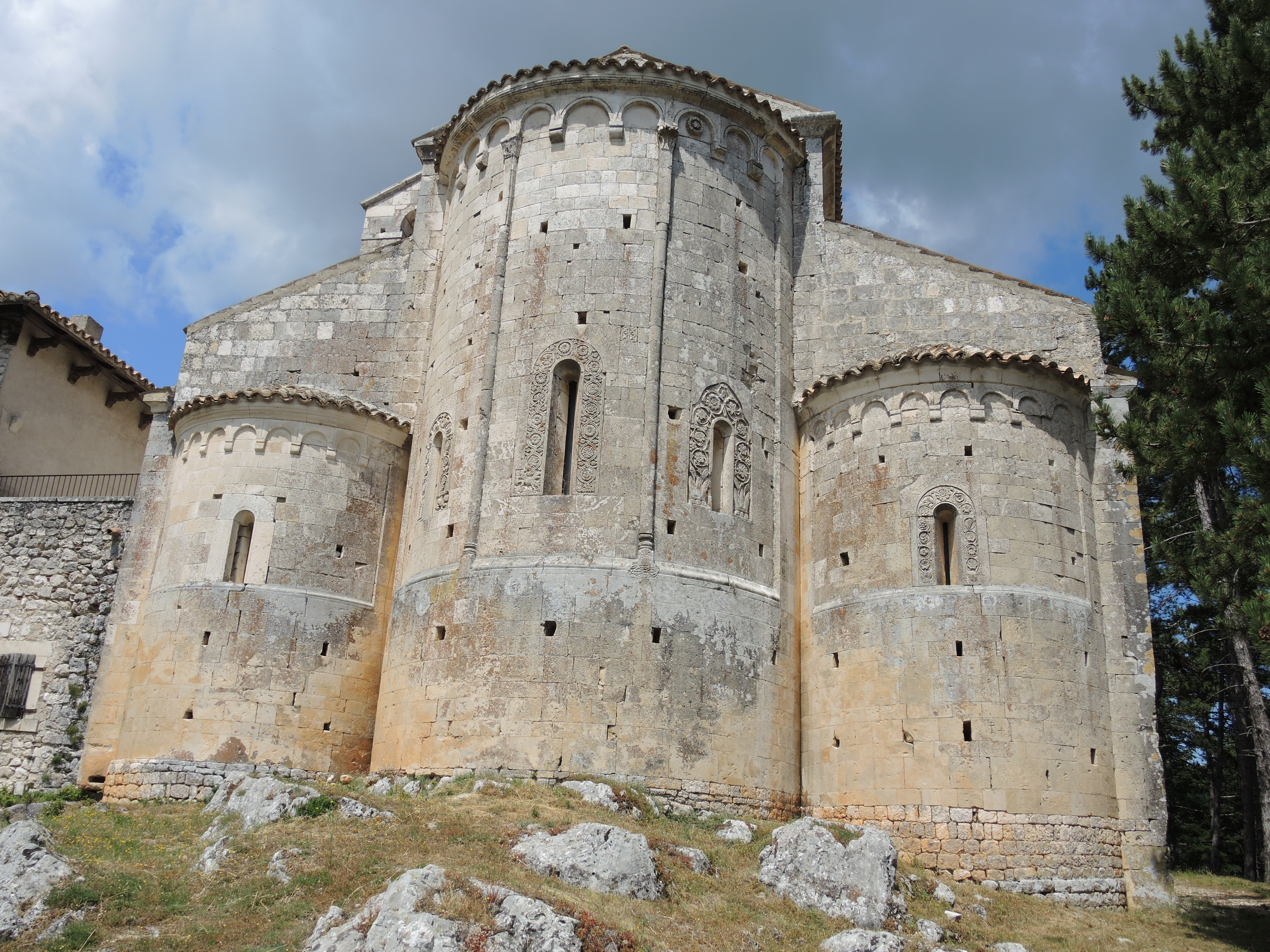
Absides.

The church is in Romanesque style, although the interior has Baroque elements. The structure mirrors that of the Abbey of San Liberatore a Majella, with a layout of three naves and three apses. At the end of the right nave is a bell tower with two arches.

The facade is a smooth wall of ashlar stone, with a gable corresponding to the central nave and horizontal to the lateral naves. The facade features a simple portal and a monofora at the center of the gable. The archivolt of the portal is decorated with a palmette motif, while the architrave alternates palmettes with a floral motif, with a lion at the center. The single-lancet window has a round arch and is framed by a raised border hosting four corbels with lion figures.

The left side wall of the church, which was once connected to the monastery, is extremely simple with four windows and two plain doors, while the right side features windows with frames decorated similarly to the facade.

The rear of the church houses three apses resting on a high plinth, with the central one taller than the two lateral ones. The central apse is divided by two pilasters into three bays, each with a narrow window with splayed openings, and is decorated at the top with nine small arches. Similar decorations are found on the narrow window of the left apse, while the right apse is completely plain.

=== Interior ===
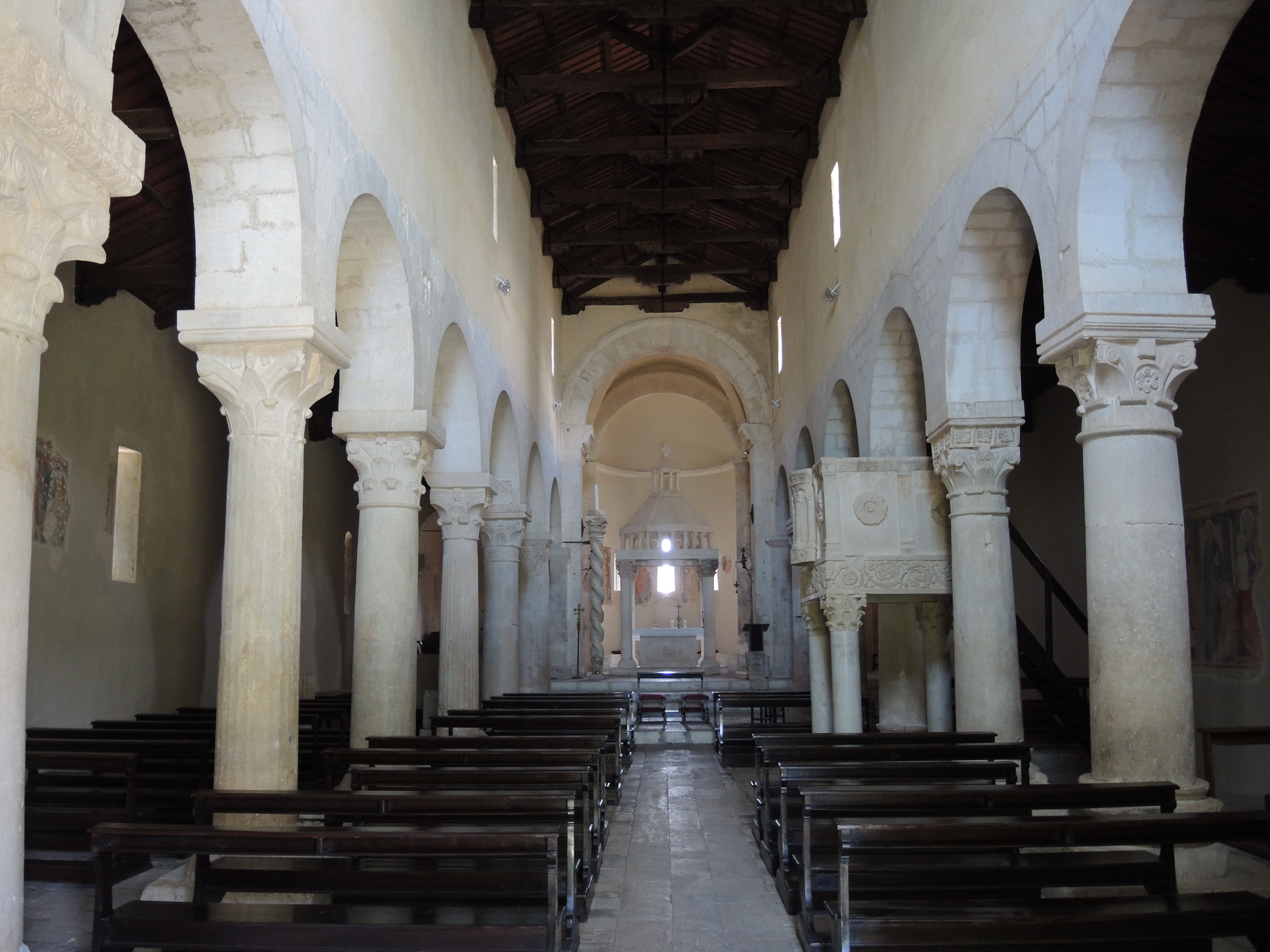
Central nave.

The interior of the church features three naves separated by twelve columns, all different from one another, presumably made with materials recovered from the nearby Peltuinum, supporting round arches. The roof of the nave was originally wooden, later transformed with Baroque vaults.

On the left side of the central nave, next to the fourth column, is the ambo from 1180, created by Abbot Giovanni. It is supported by three cylindrical columns and one spiral column with Corinthian capitals that support architraves with intricate friezes. The friezes support rectangular balconies, with the two lateral ones divided by a pillar into two sections, each containing a sculpted flower. The front balcony is divided into three areas, with the central one hosting a semicylinder intended for the lectern.

The presbytery is raised three steps above the nave, separated from it by two cross-shaped pilasters, and has a vaulted ceiling. The ciborium and altar are dated to 1233, the year of the church's consecration. Next to the ciborium is an Easter candle holder consisting of a spiral column supported by a stilophore lion; it ends with a capital on which rests a crown that holds the candle.

Also by Abbot Giovanni is the cathedra located in the apse of the central nave.

== Gallery ==
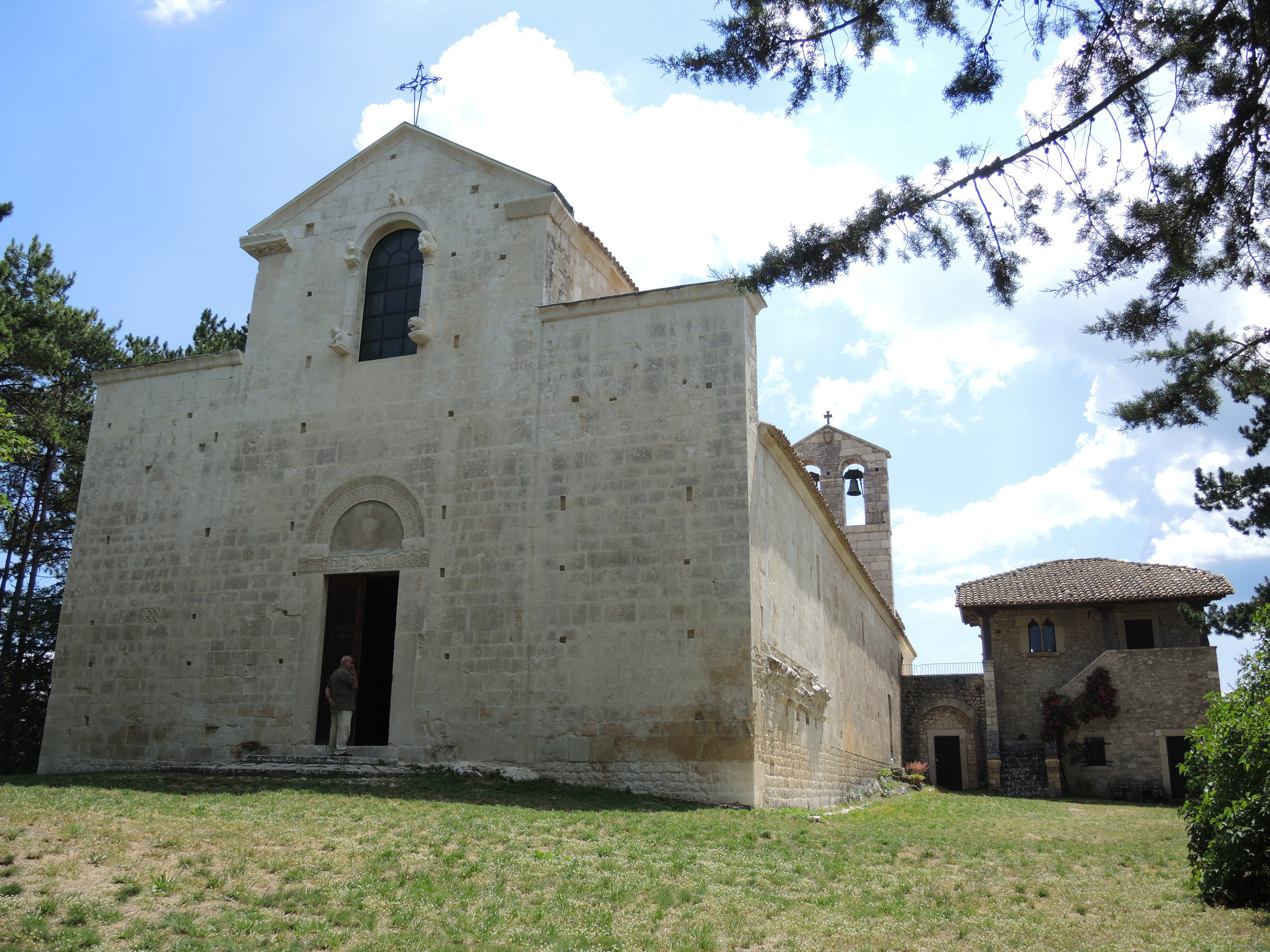
Right side wall

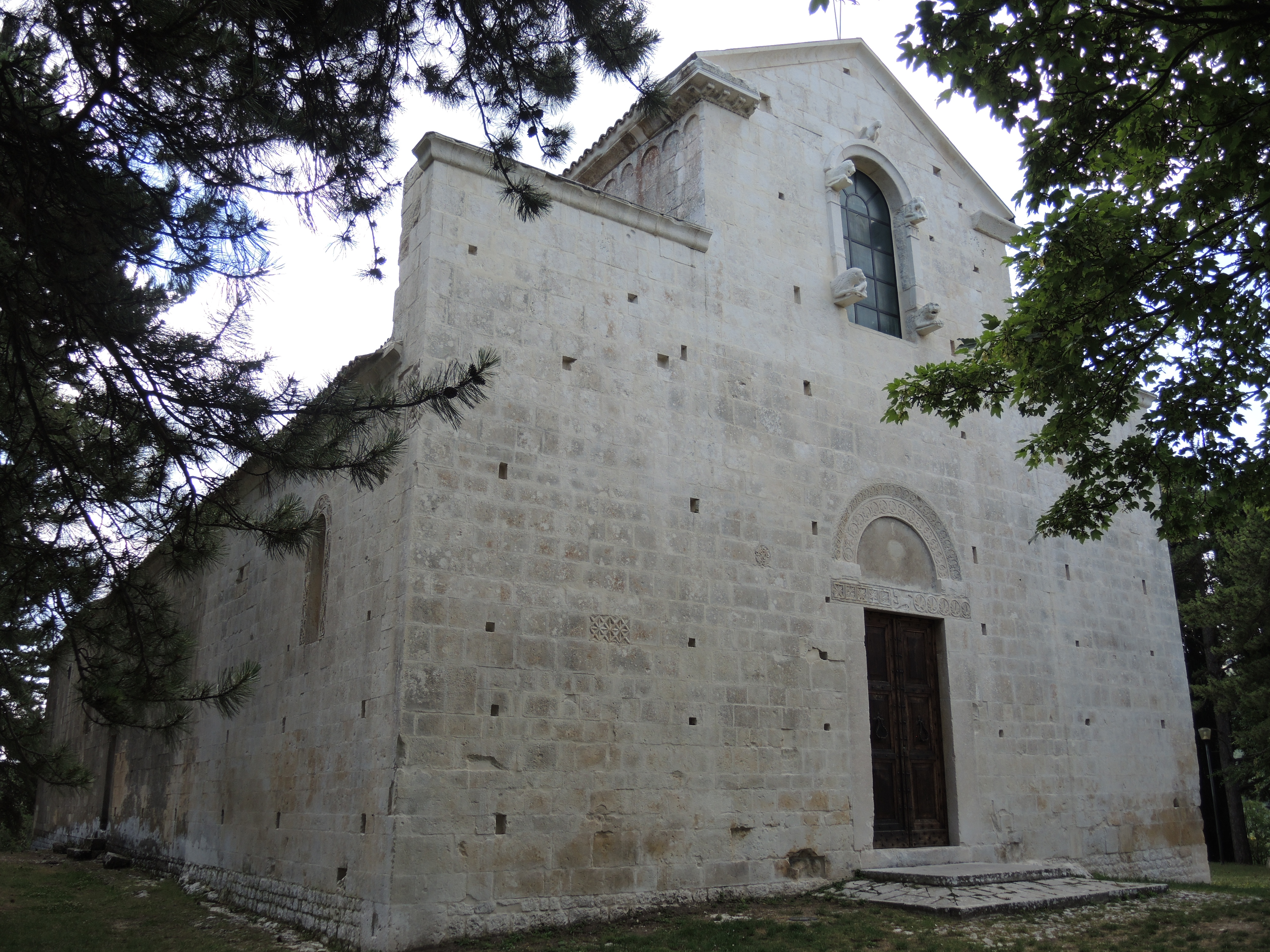
Left side wall

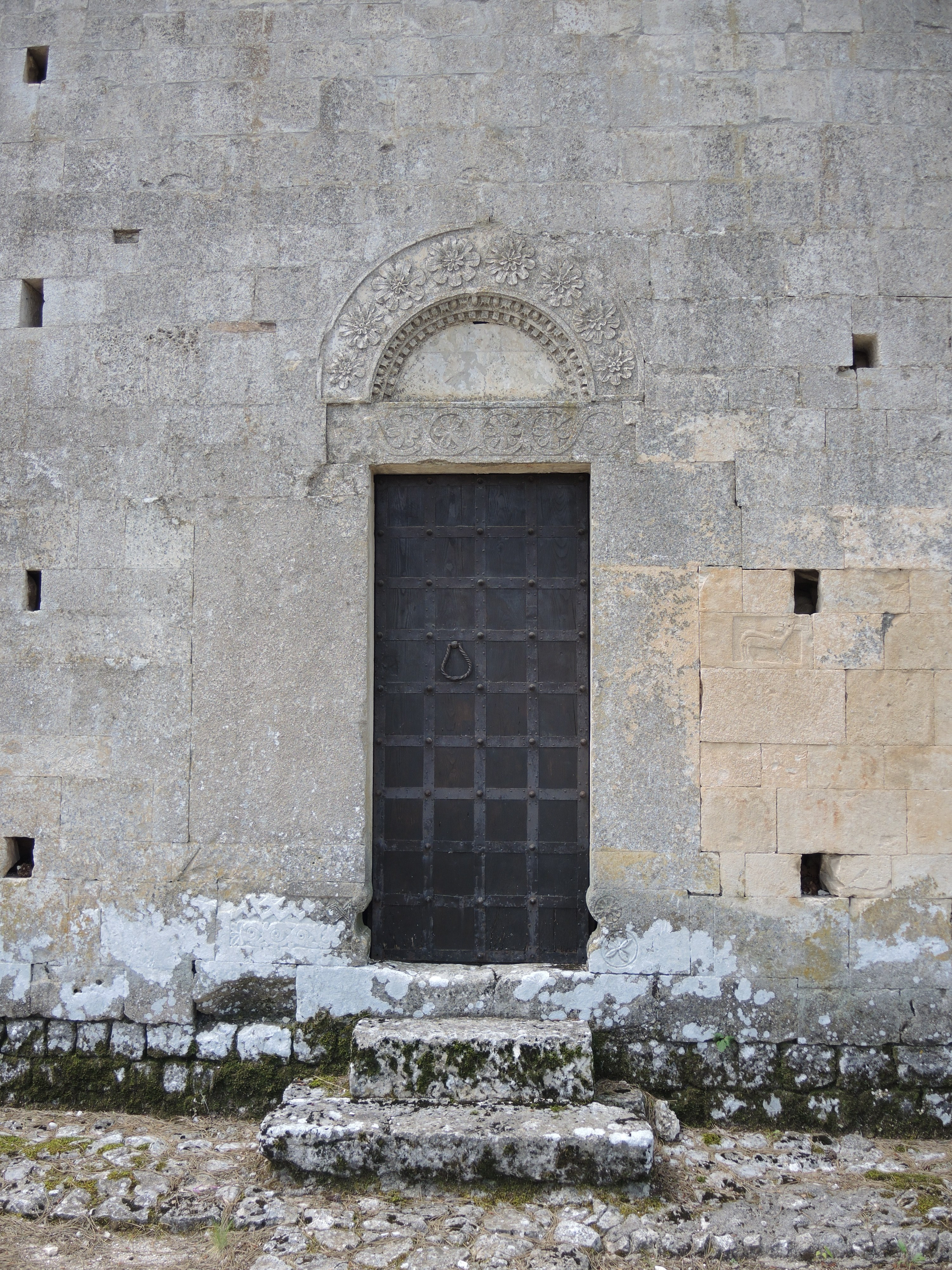
Left side portal

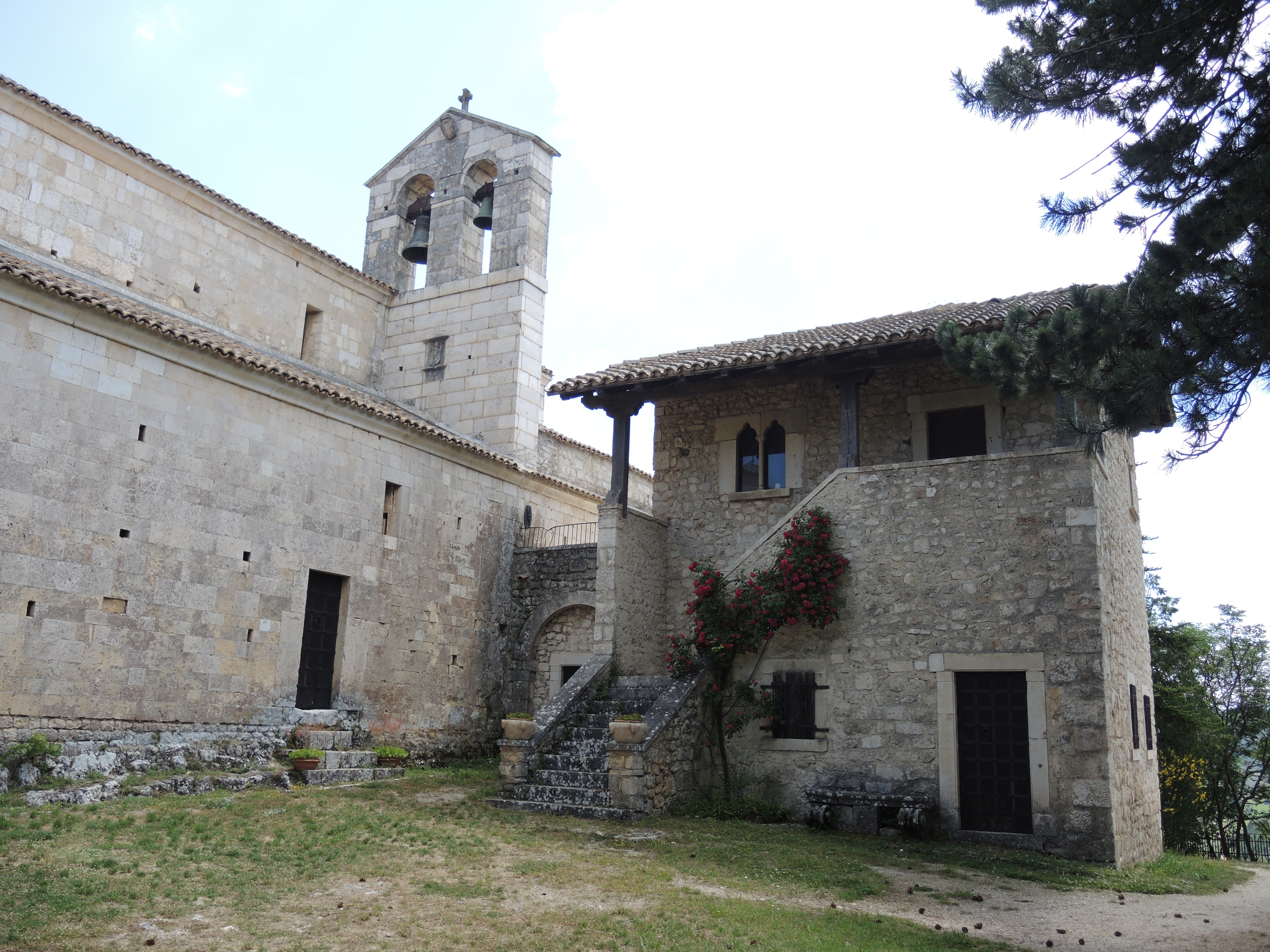
Right side wall

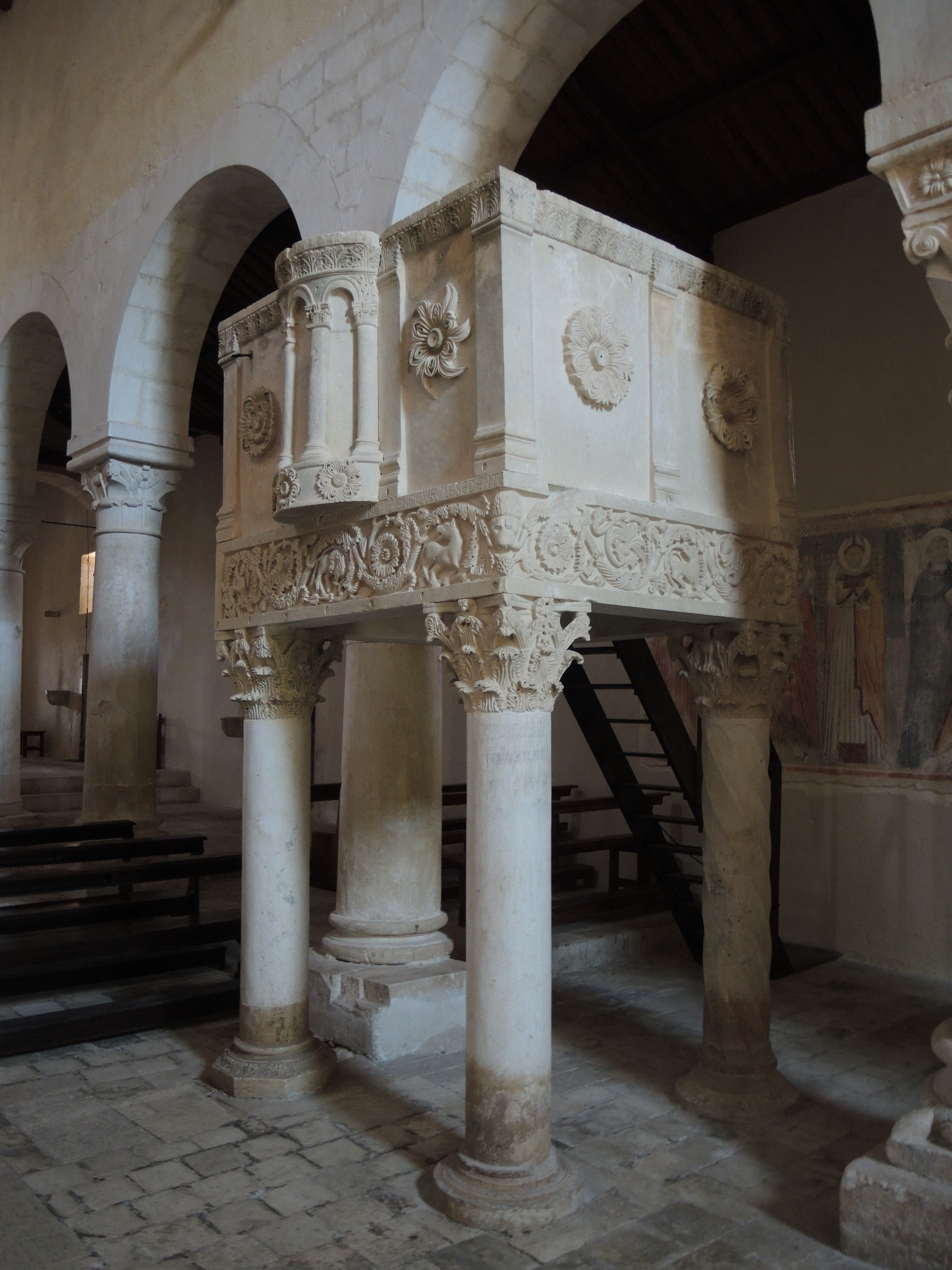
Ambo

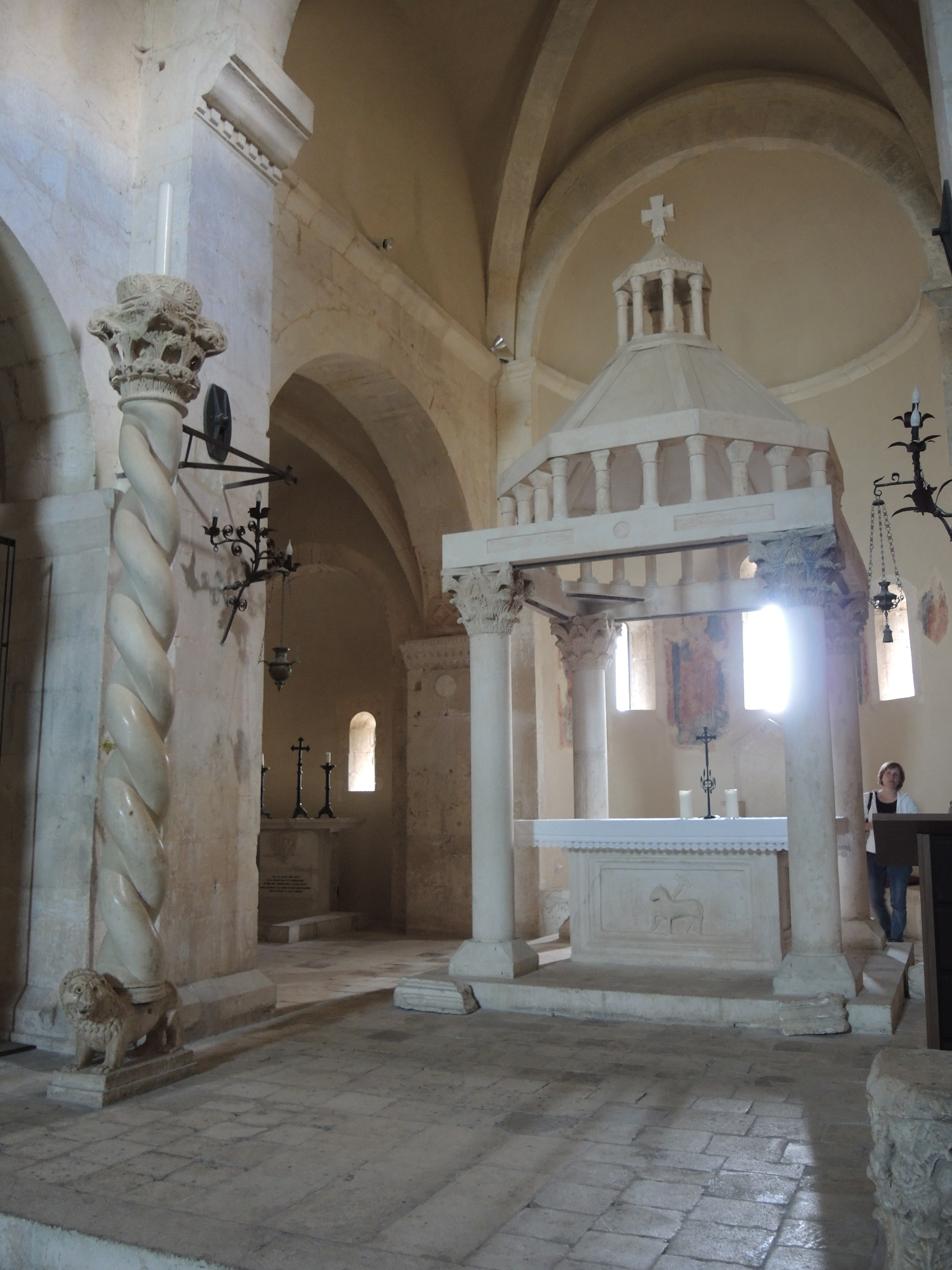
Easter candle holder

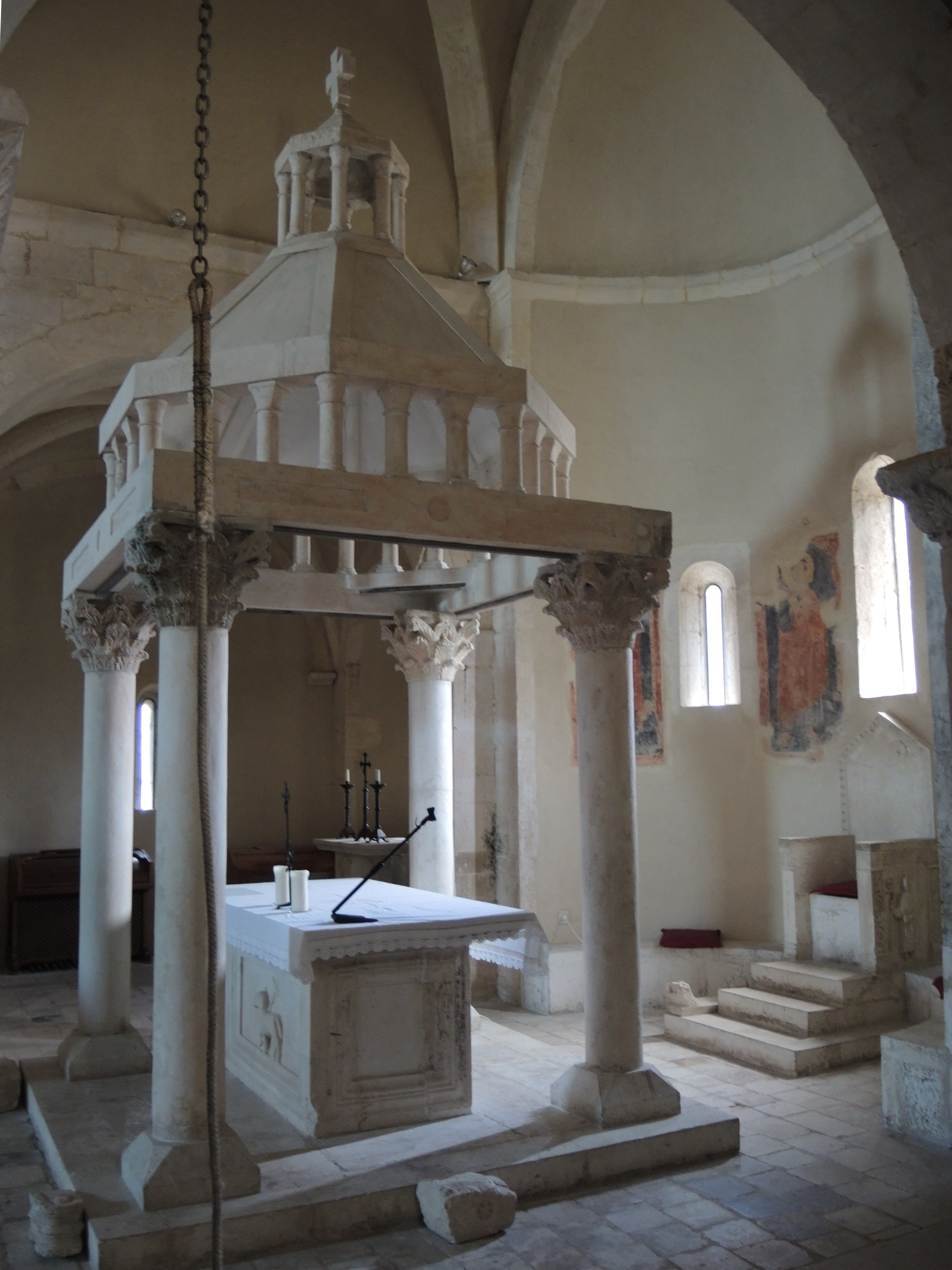
Altar, ciborium, and cathedra

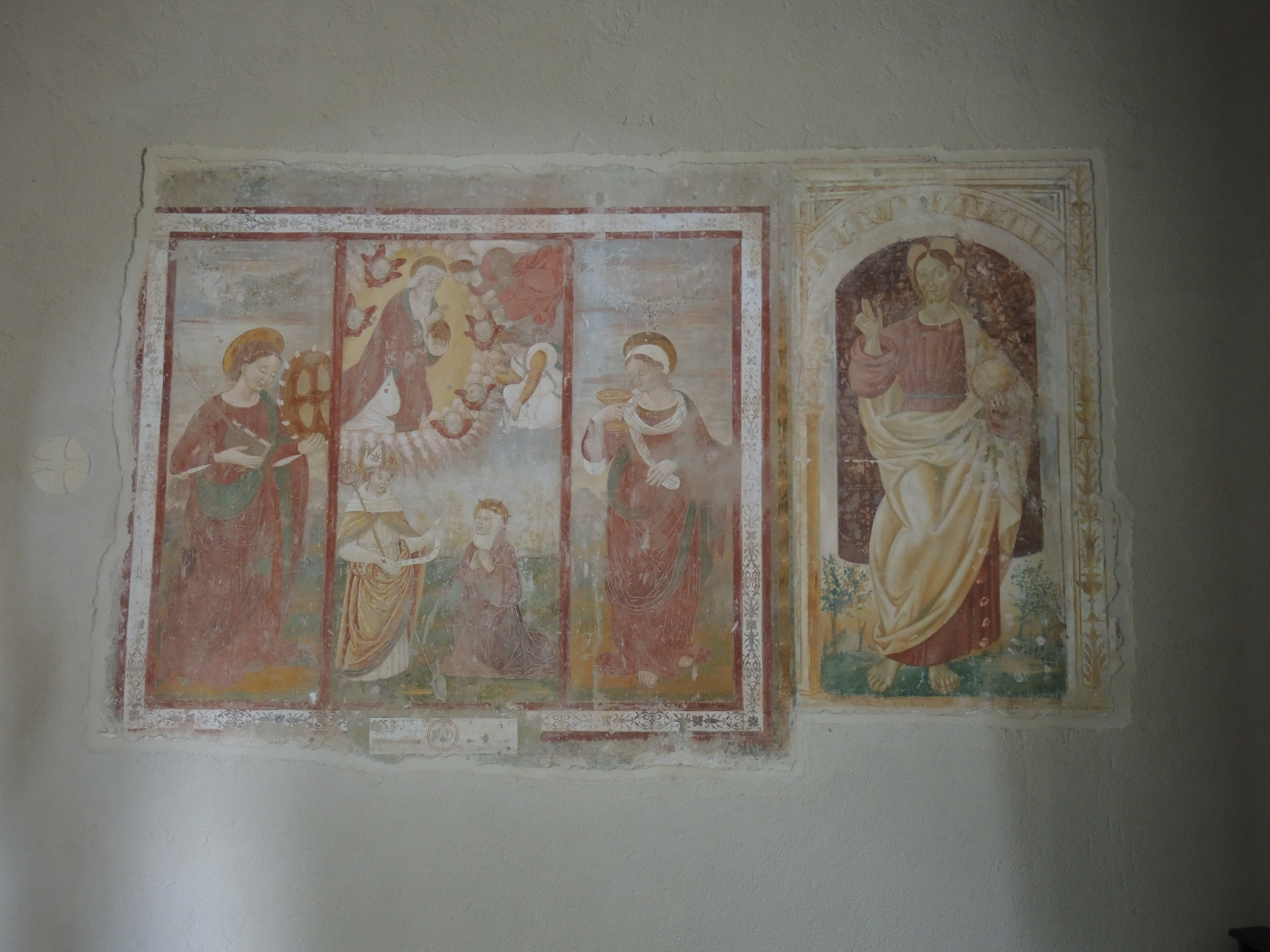
Frescoes of the left nave

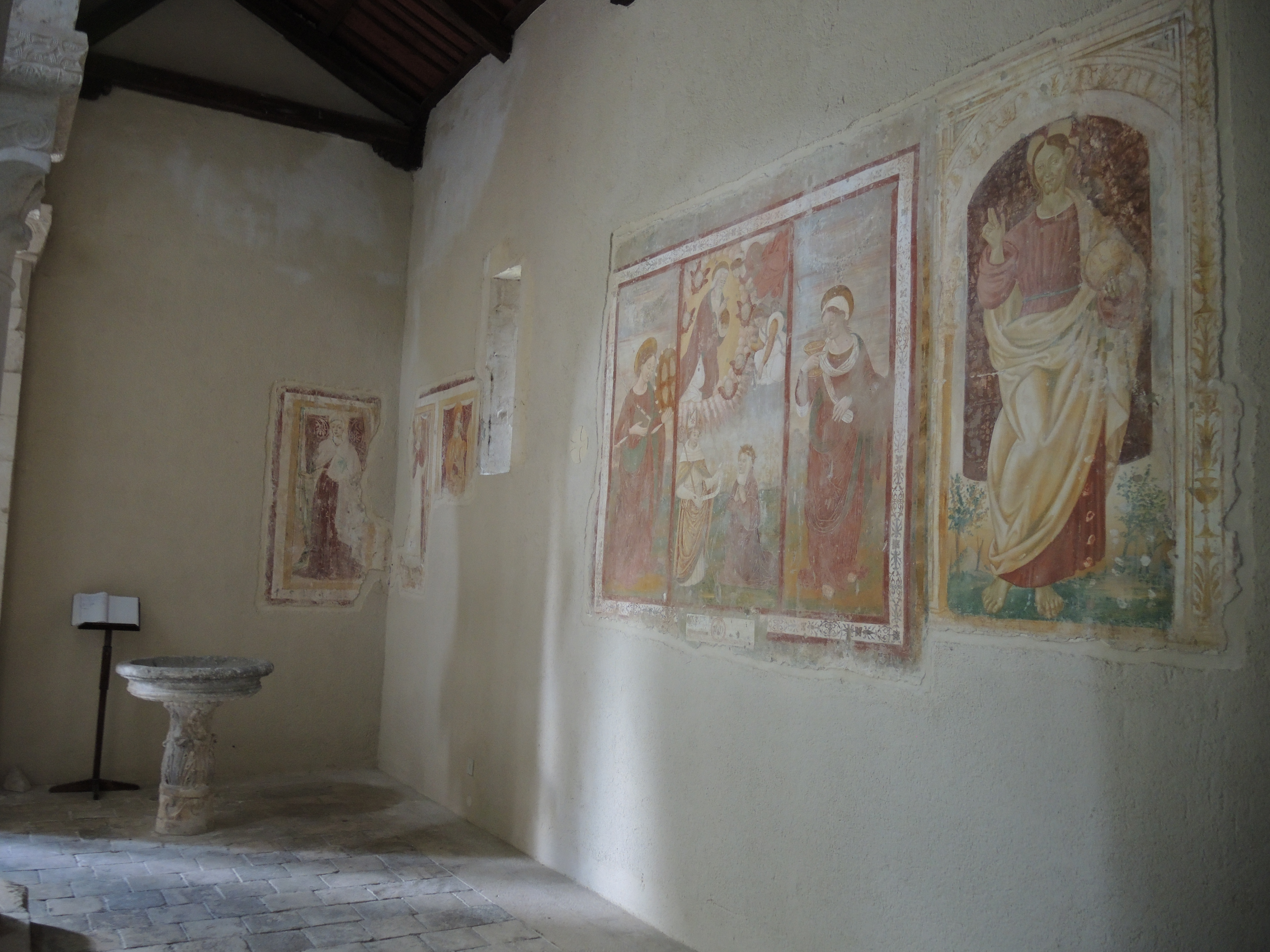
Frescoes of the right nave
