= Rock-cut complex of San Liberatore =

Rock-cut architecture in Pescara, Italy

Coordinates: 42.2395°N 14.0945°E

- Complesso rupestre di San Liberatore
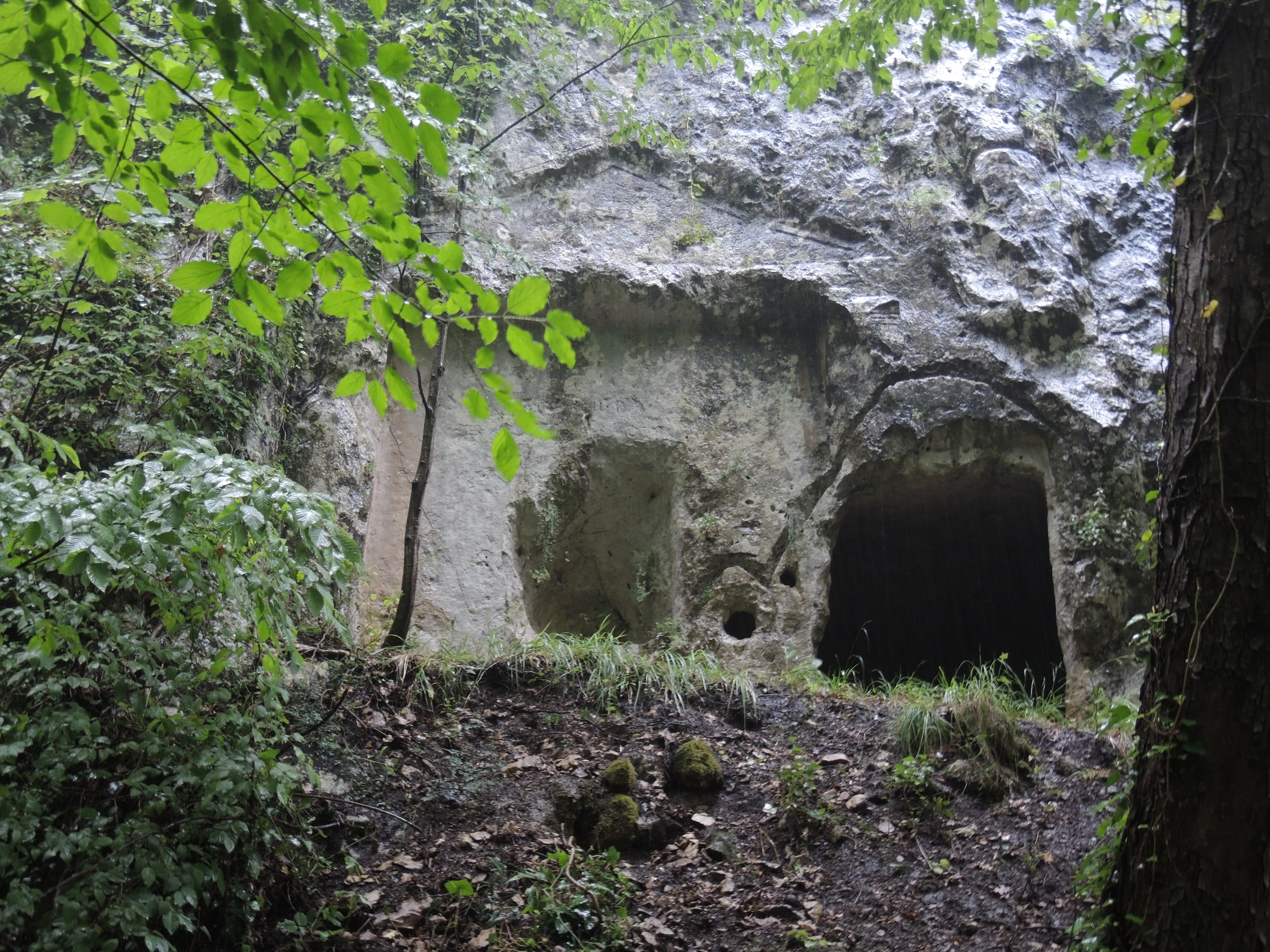
- View of the complex

- Location within Abruzzo

Religion
- Affiliation: Roman Catholic
- Province: Province of Pescara
- Region: Abruzzo

Location
- Municipality: Serramonacesca
- State: Italy
- Interactive map of Rock-cut complex of San Liberatore

Complesso rupestre di San Liberatore (Italian for Rock-cut complex of Saint Liberator) is a rock-cut architecture located in Serramonacesca, Province of Pescara (Abruzzo, Italy).

== Location ==
The complex is located on the rocky wall to the right of the road that leads from Serramonacesca to the Abbey of San Liberatore a Maiella, immediately after the church of the Madonna dell'Annunziata. Visitors must venture a few meters into the vegetation to glimpse the complex located under the rocky wall.

== History ==
There are no historical sources on the origin of the rock complex. It is believed that the caves were created by the monks of San Liberatore, presumably for burials or as hermit cells. The complex may also have been used as a shelter for animals.

== Architecture ==
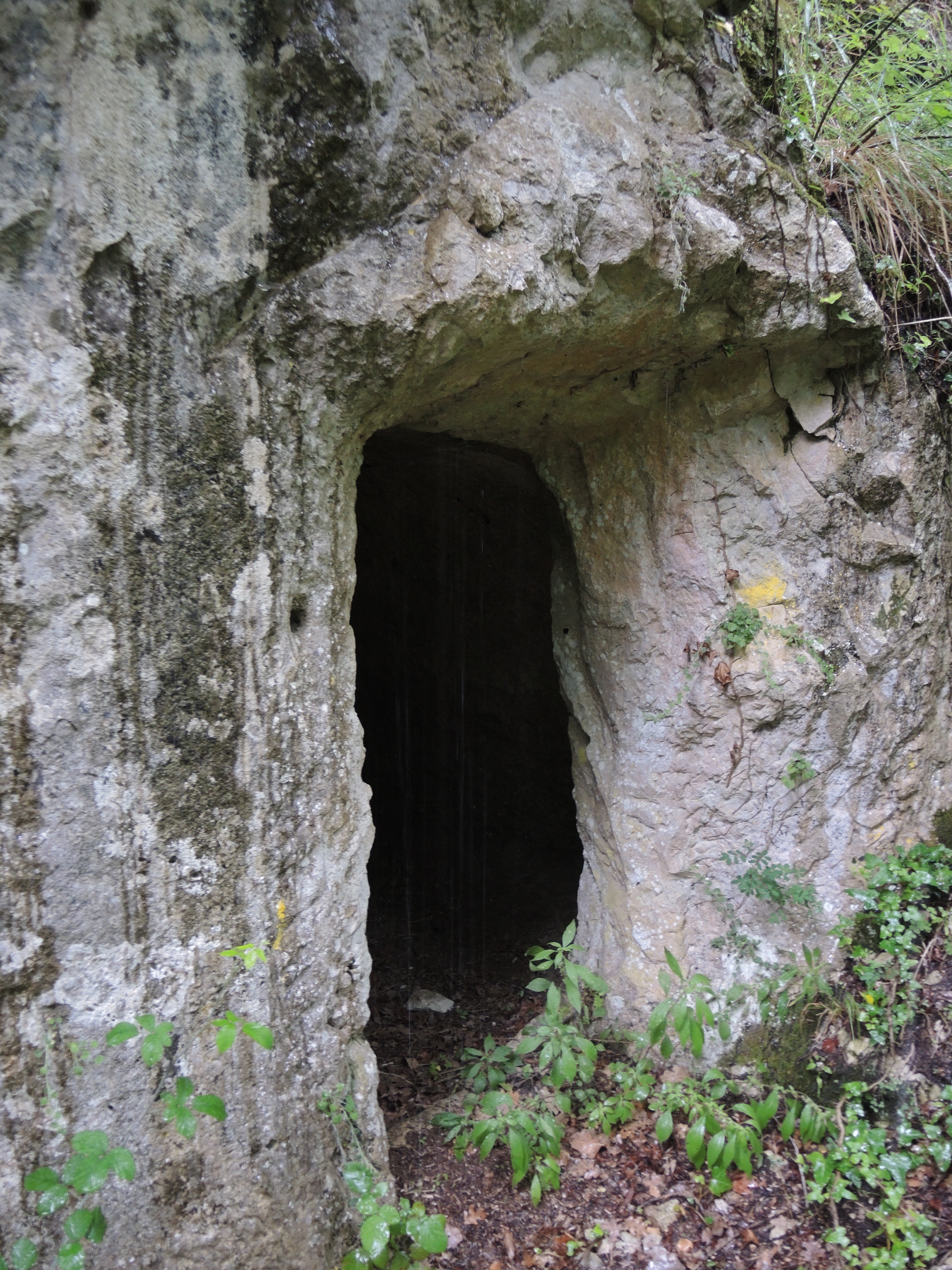
Entrance to the smaller cell

The structure consists of two cells: a larger one on the left and a smaller one on the right. The plan of both cells is rectangular with irregular vaults carved into the rock.

The front wall of the complex features a niche surmounted by a pediment, to the right of which is the entrance door to the larger cell, characterized by a seat carved into the stone in its left wall. There is the entrance door to the second cell.
