= Castel Menardo =

Medieval castle in Abruzzo, Italy

Coordinates: 42.2402°N 14.0862°E

Menardo Castle
- Castel Menardo
- Serramonacesca
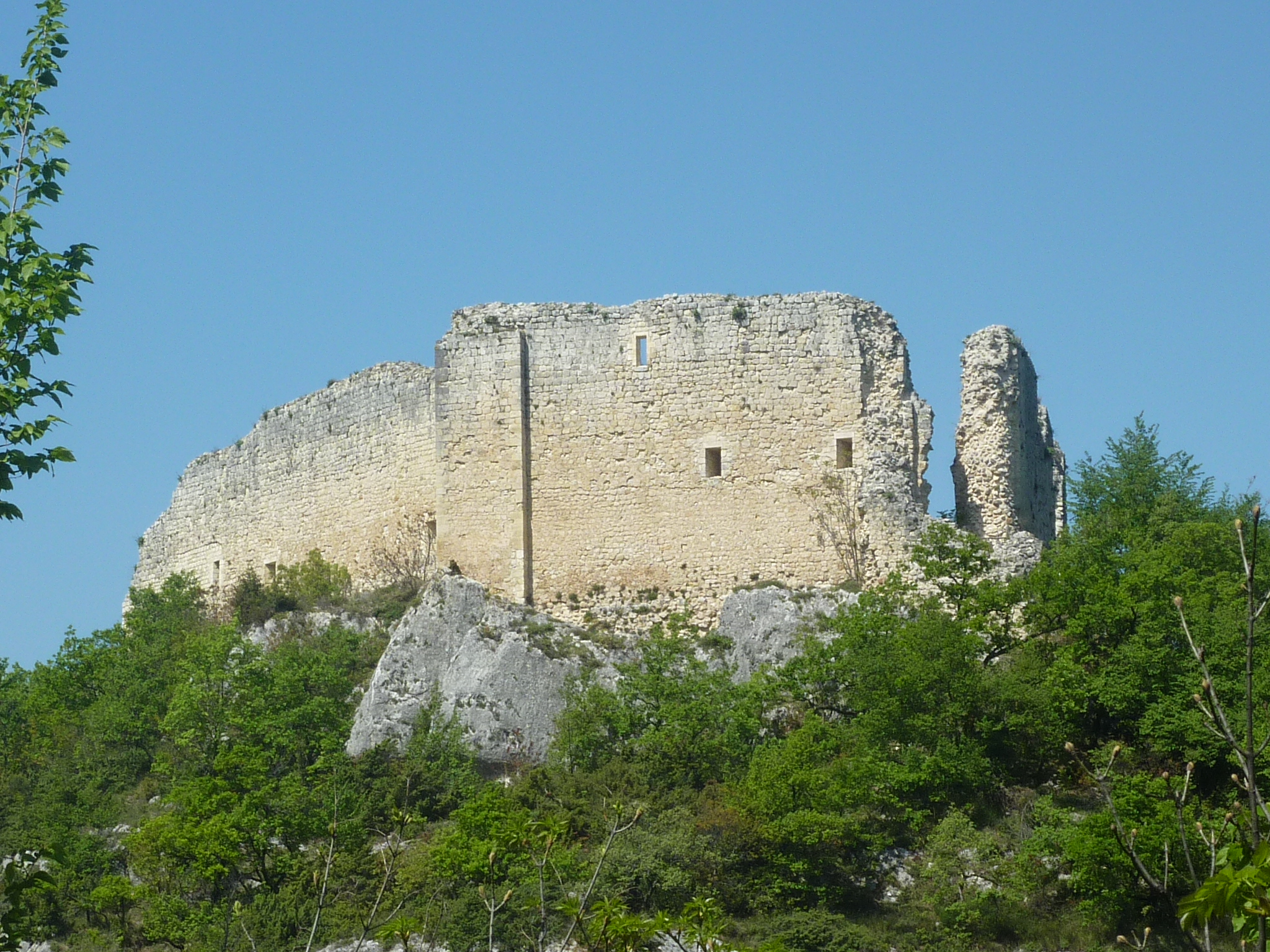
- Castle in Serramonacesca

Site information
- Type: Castle
- Condition: Ruins

Location

Site history
- Built: 12th century

Castel Menardo (Italian for Menardo Castle) is a medieval castle in Serramonacesca, Province of Pescara, Abruzzo, southern Italy.

== History ==
The location of Castel Menardo, between the Val Pescara and the Maiella mountains, suggests that the fortress had a defensive role against Saracen incursions aimed at the nearby Abbey of San Liberatore. In this context, the castle should be considered together with the tower of Polegra, situated diametrically opposite the church.

There are no reliable sources confirming the origin of the castle. However, tradition, as with the abbey, attributes its construction to Charlemagne, who supposedly built it to defend the southern edge of his empire. More likely, however, the construction of the castle dates back to between the 12th and 14th centuries.

== Architecture ==
The current ruinous state of the castle makes it difficult to reconstruct its structure. The layout is triangular, with a quadrangular structure at one end and the other two vertices protected by circular towers. The main body was likely on two levels with traces of rooms at a lower level than the castle's main floor.

The castle, visible from the road leading to the Hermitage of Sant'Onofrio, is not easily accessible except on foot via a path approximately one kilometer long.
