= Oratory of San Pellegrino =

- Oratorio di San Pellegrino
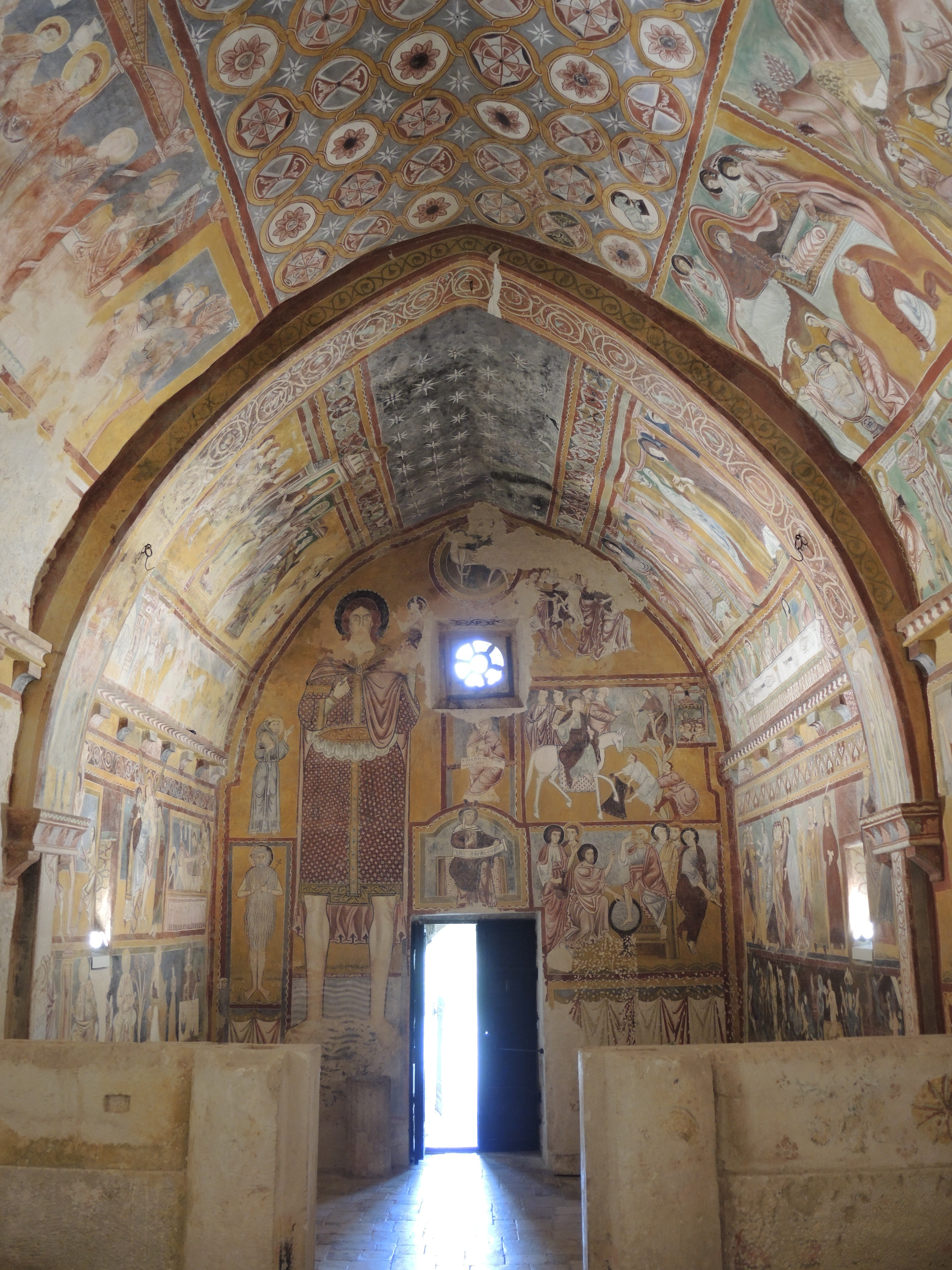
- Frescos

- 42.243047°N 13.660833°E
- Location: Bominaco (Caporciano)
- Country: Italy
- Denomination: Catholic
- Website: http://www.comunecaporciano.aq.it/hh/index.php

History
- Status: Oratory

Architecture
- Functional status: Active
- Style: Medieval
- Completed: 1263

Administration
- Diocese: Archdiocese of L'Aquila

Oratorio di San Pellegrino (Italian for Oratory of San Pellegrino) is a medieval oratory in the village of Bominaco, in the municipality of Caporciano in the Province of L'Aquila (Abruzzo). The interior walls of the church are entirely covered in frescoes that represent a historical testimony of medieval Abruzzo. In 1902, the oratory was declared a national monument.

== History ==
The oratory was part of a Benedictine monastery, Santa Maria Assunta, that was established in the Carolingian era. An inscription on the back wall indicates it was constructed in 1263, commissioned by Abbot Teodino. The oratory was believed to have been constructed over the tomb of San Pellegrino of Syria, a saint evidently highly regarded in this area, but little is known about him.

UNESCO declared the oratory a World Heritage Site in 1996.

== Architecture ==
Exterior

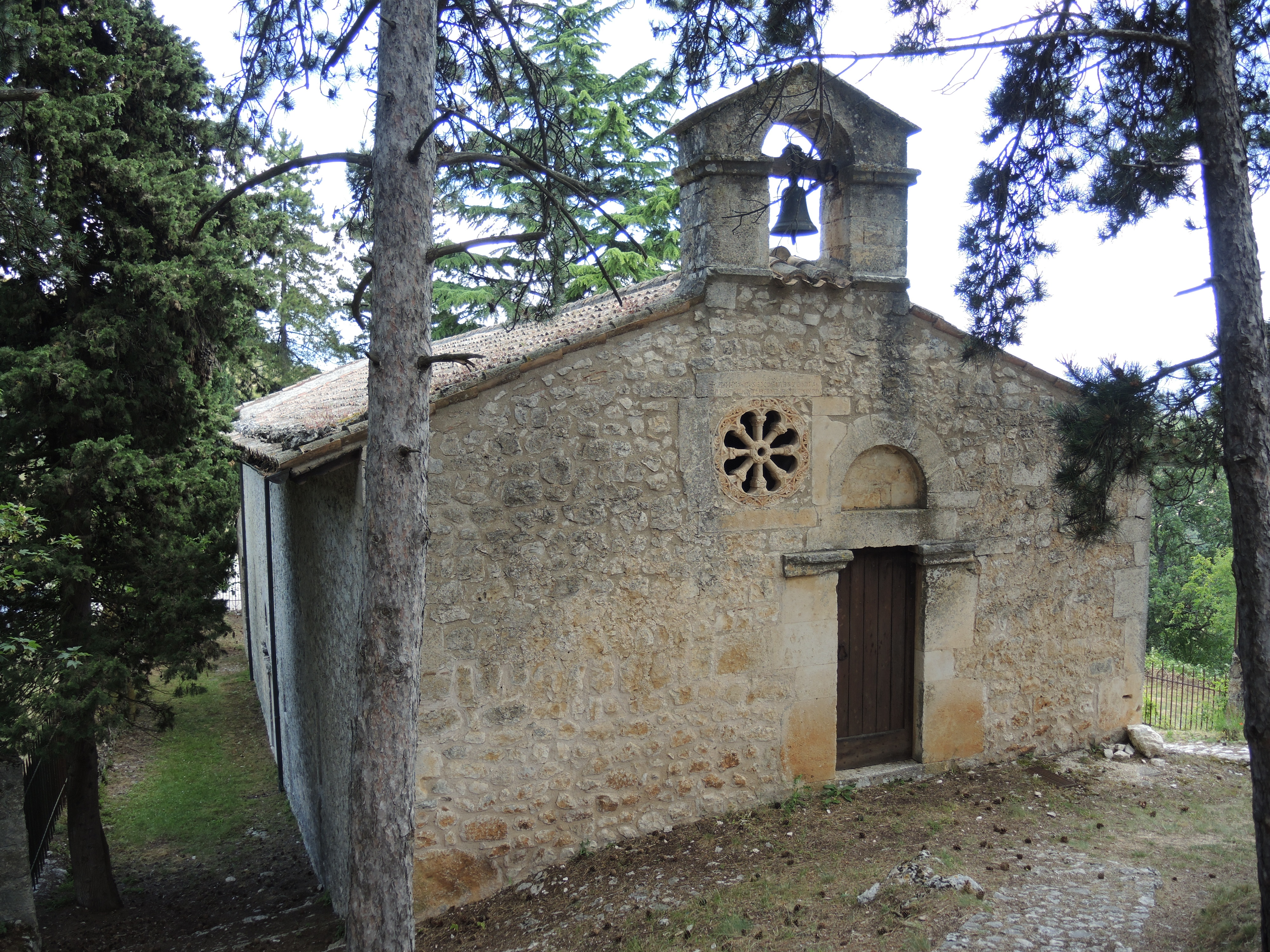
Rear facade

An eighteenth-century porch marks the front facade, while a bell tower tops the back.

Interior

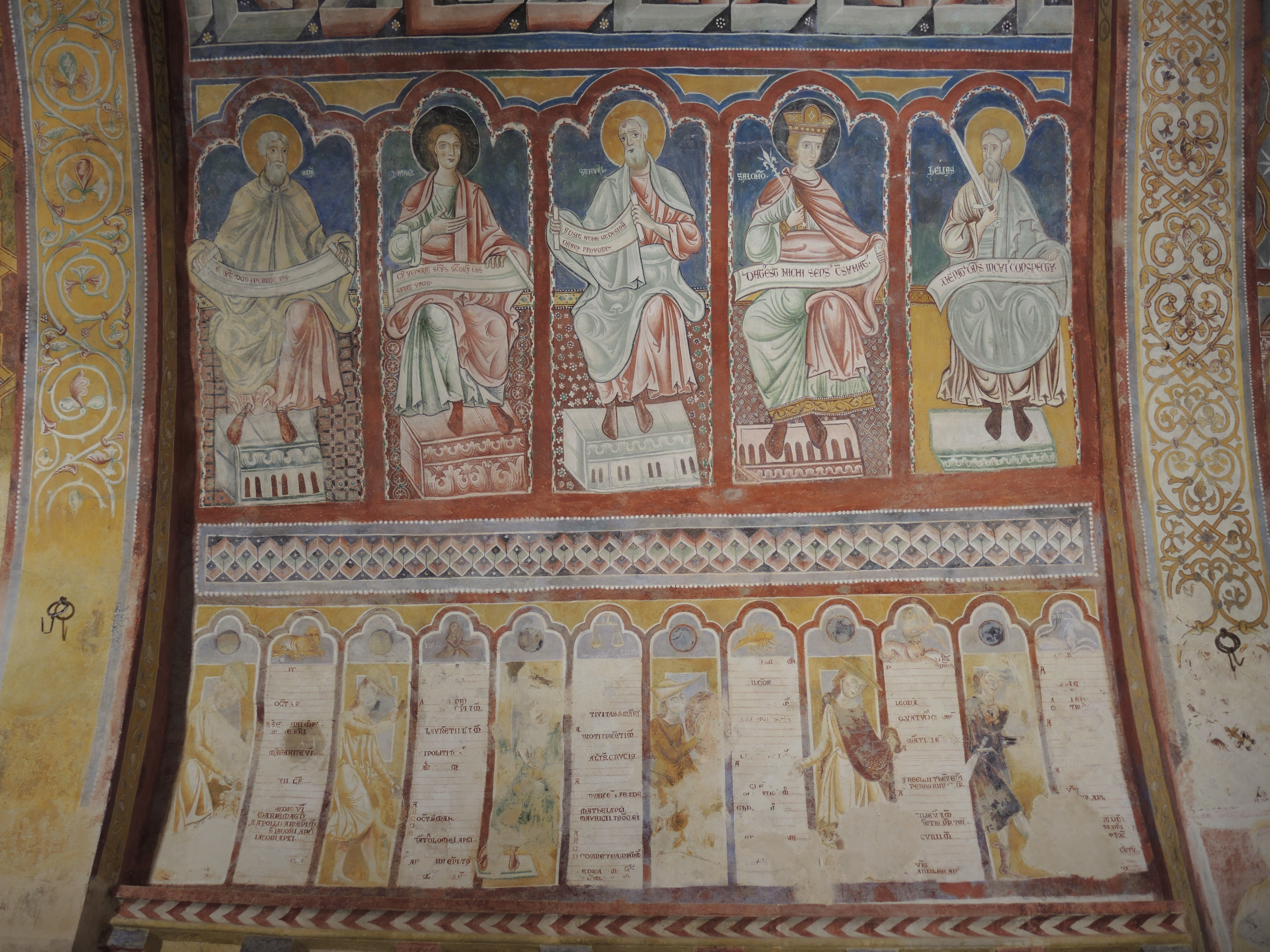
The so-called "Calendario Bominacese" frescoes

The small space (18.7 x 5.6m) comprises a single nave with ogival vaults in 4 bays. (Interior of Oratory) It is lit by three small windows on each side and rosette windows on the front and back facades. The space is divided by a half wall that must have served to separate lay visitors from the monks. The interior walls are entirely covered with frescoes, which date to the late 13th century.

== Frescoes ==
4 rows of frescoes decorate the walls. At the lowest level are faux hanging curtains. Above, 3 rows of narratives represent scenes from the childhood of Christ, the Passion, the Last Judgment, the lives of St. Pellegrino and other saints, and months of the calendar. It has been suggested that a Charlemagne cycle was also included (now fragmentary). The apex of the vaults is covered with bands of geometric patterns. At least 3 different artists are thought to have produced the paintings, which owe a strong debt to Byzantine-Roman medieval traditions. Scholars have also noted a strong interest in lively naturalism in many of the frescoes, suggesting influences of northern Gothic art.
