= Rock-cut tombs of San Liberatore =

9th-century burial place in Abruzzo, Italy

Coordinates: 42.2351°N 14.1005°E

- Tombe rupestri di San Liberatore
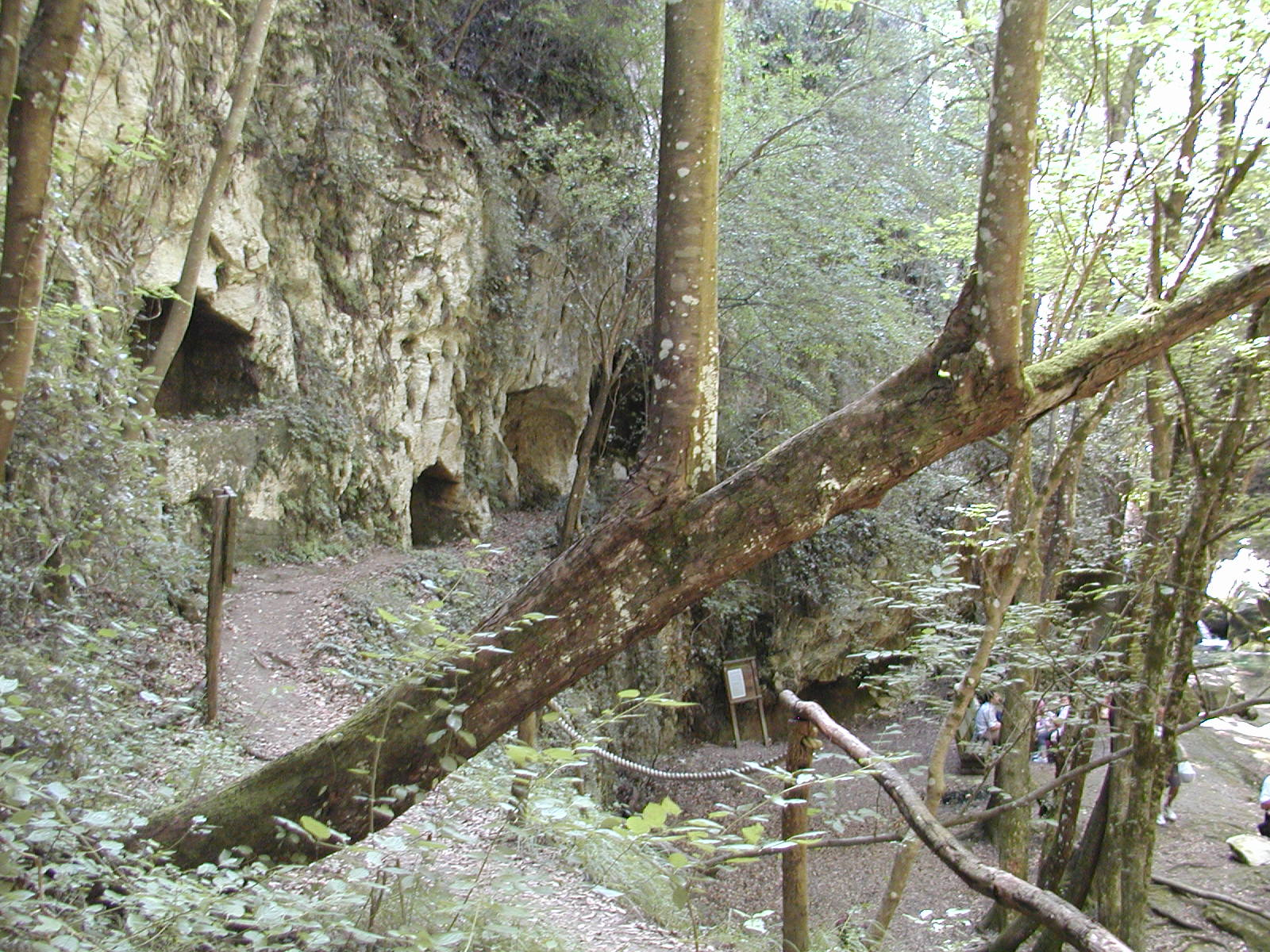
- View of the tombs

- Location within Abruzzo

Religion
- Affiliation: Roman Catholic
- Province: Province of Pescara
- Region: Abruzzo

Location
- Municipality: Serramonacesca
- State: Italy
- Interactive map of Rock-cut tombs of San Liberatore

Architecture
- Completed: 8th-9th century

Tombe rupestri di San Liberatore (Italian for Rock-cut tombs of Saint Liberator) is a burial place located in Serramonacesca, Province of Pescara (Abruzzo, Italy).

== History ==
There are no historical sources about the origin of the tomb complex. It is hypothesized that it was built by a small group of hermits who inhabited the area between the 8th and 9th century.

From the toponymy of the area, it is deduced that it must have been dedicated to Saint John, as the place is still called San Giuannelle (Little Saint John), presumably due to the presence of a youthful statue of the saint in one of the niches carved into the wall.

== Architecture ==
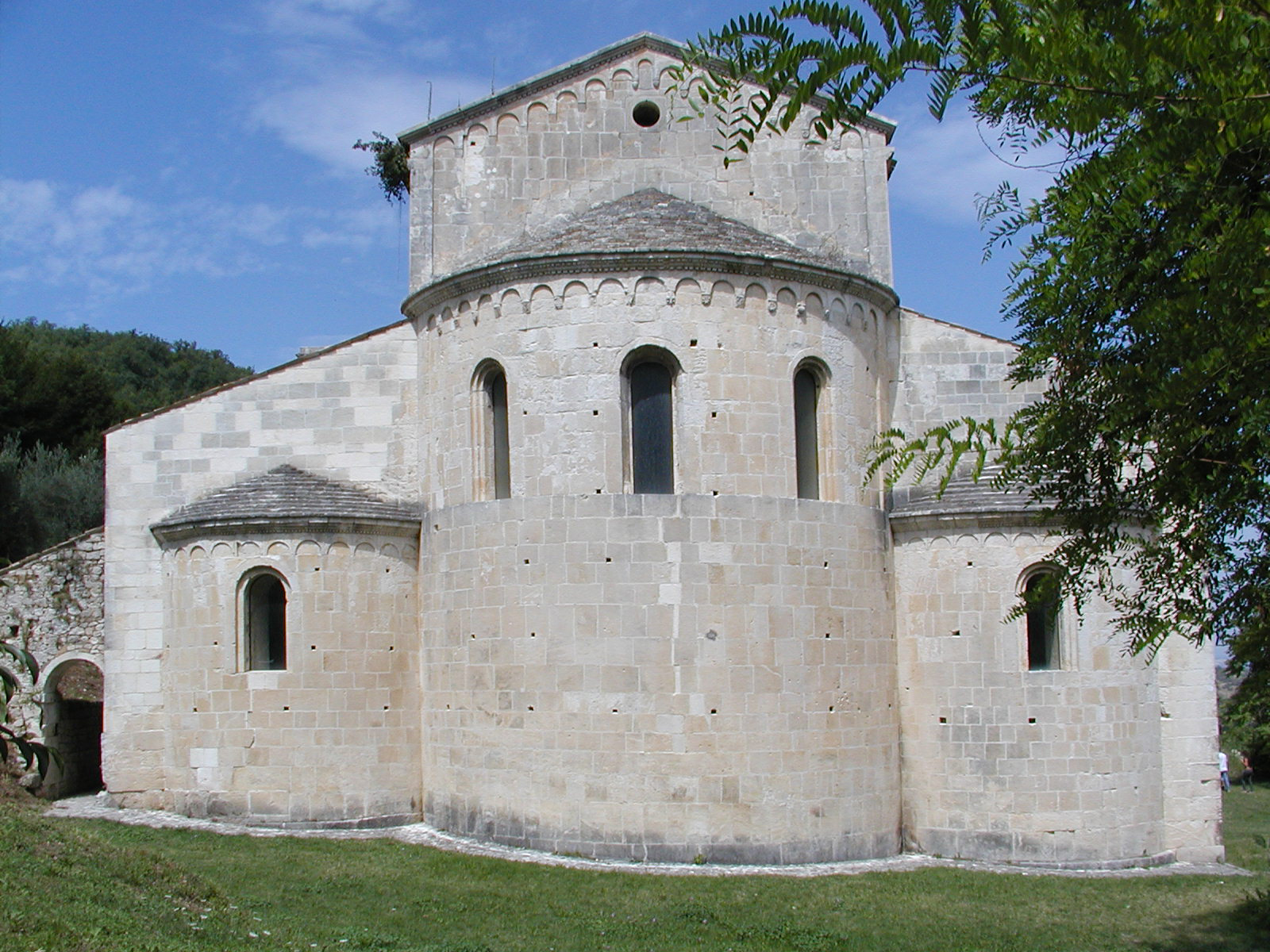
The structure of San Liberatore

The road leading to the rock complex starts from the left side of the square of the Abbey of San Liberatore, facing the church's facade. The path descends easily until it reaches the Alento River bed, which can be crossed easily due to the low water flow. Then, a short climb leads to a 20-meter wall where the tombs are located.

On the wall, which features a narrow walkway, three tombs, a small niche, and a chapel can be identified. The tombs have the shape of a sarcophagus topped by an arch, reminiscent of Christian catacombs. Next is the niche, where a base of about 50 cm on each side can be seen, presumably used for the statue of Saint John. The chapel measures 1.70 x 5 x 2.50 meters. On the left side, there is a basin for collecting rainwater, possibly used as a holy water font.
