= Bominaco =

Coordinates: 42°14′36″N 13°39′32″E

- Frazione
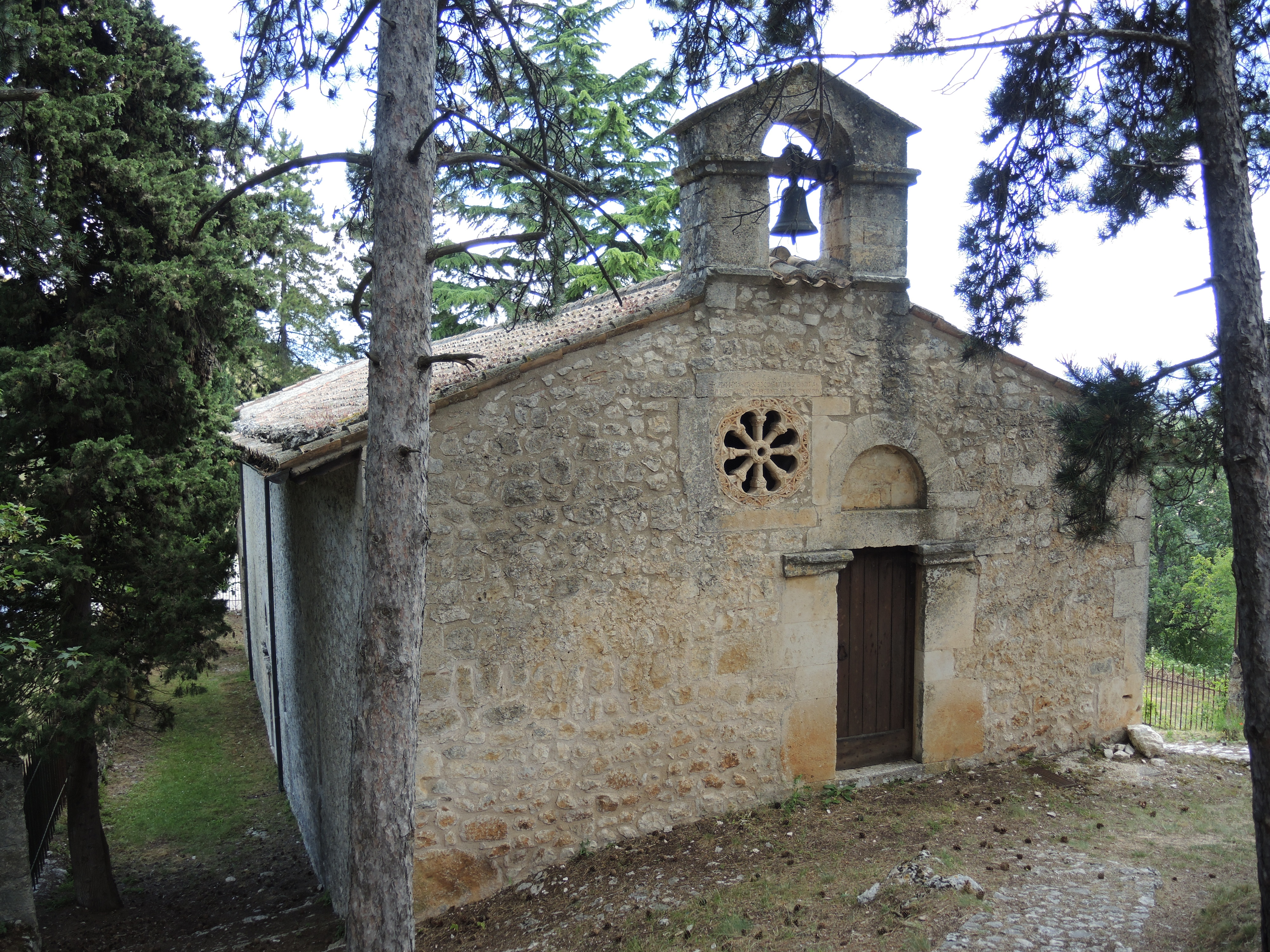
- Bominaco, Oratory of San Pellegrino
- Interactive map of Bominaco
- Country: Italy
- Region: Abruzzo
- Province: L'Aquila
- Commune: Caporciano
- Elevation: 1,000 m (3,300 ft)

Population (2013)
  - Total: 58
- Time zone: UTC+1 (CET)
  - Summer (DST): UTC+2 (CEST)
- Postal code: 67020

Bominaco is the sole frazione of Caporciano in the province of L'Aquila in the Abruzzo region of southern Italy.

== Main sights ==
This small village contains three notable monuments. The Castle of Bominaco dates from the 15th century, built on the ruins of a 12th-century castle. The Oratory of San Pellegrino, built in 1263 under the auspices of the ancient monastery once situated in Bominaco, is noted for its many frescoes, contemporaneous with the construction. It was declared a national monument in 1906. The Romanesque church of Santa Maria Assunta, once the church of the former abbey, bears the date of 1180 on the pulpit but is definitely older. It was declared a national monument in 1902.
