= Serramonacesca =

- Comune
- Comune di Serramonacesca
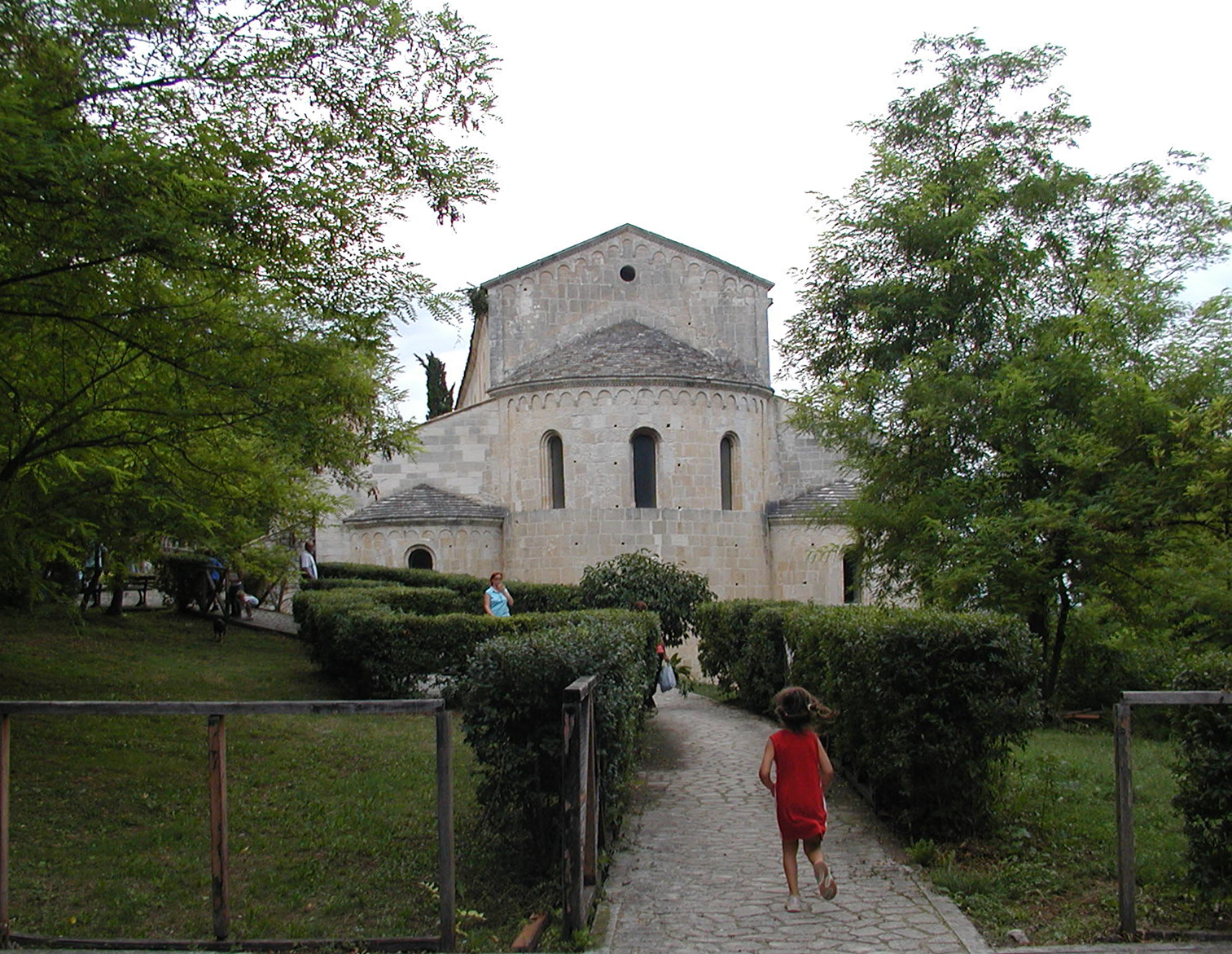
- View of Serramonacesca

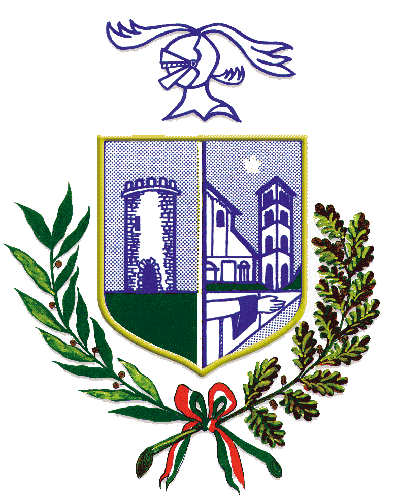
- Coat of arms

- Location within Italy Location within Abruzzo
- Coordinates: 42°15′N 14°06′E
- Country: Italy
- Region: Abruzzo
- Province: Pescara (PE)
- Frazioni: Colle Serra, Garifoli, San Ienno san Gennaro

Government
  - Mayor: Franco Enrico Marinelli

Area
  - Total: 23 km^{2} (8.9 sq mi)
- Elevation: 280 m (920 ft)

Population (28 February 2017)
  - Total: 561
  - Density: 24/km^{2} (63/sq mi)
- Demonym: Serresi
- Time zone: UTC+1 (CET)
  - Summer (DST): UTC+2 (CEST)
- Postal code: 65100
- Dialing code: 085
- Website: Official website

Serramonacesca is a comune and town in the province of Pescara in the Abruzzo region of southern Italy.

== Main sights ==
- Abbey of San Liberatore a Maiella
- Hermitage of Saint Onofrio
- The Polegra Tower
- Castel Menardo
- Rock-cut tombs of San Liberatore
- Rock-cut complex of San Liberatore
