= Castle of Bominaco =

Castle in southern Italy

- Castello di Bominaco
- Bominaco
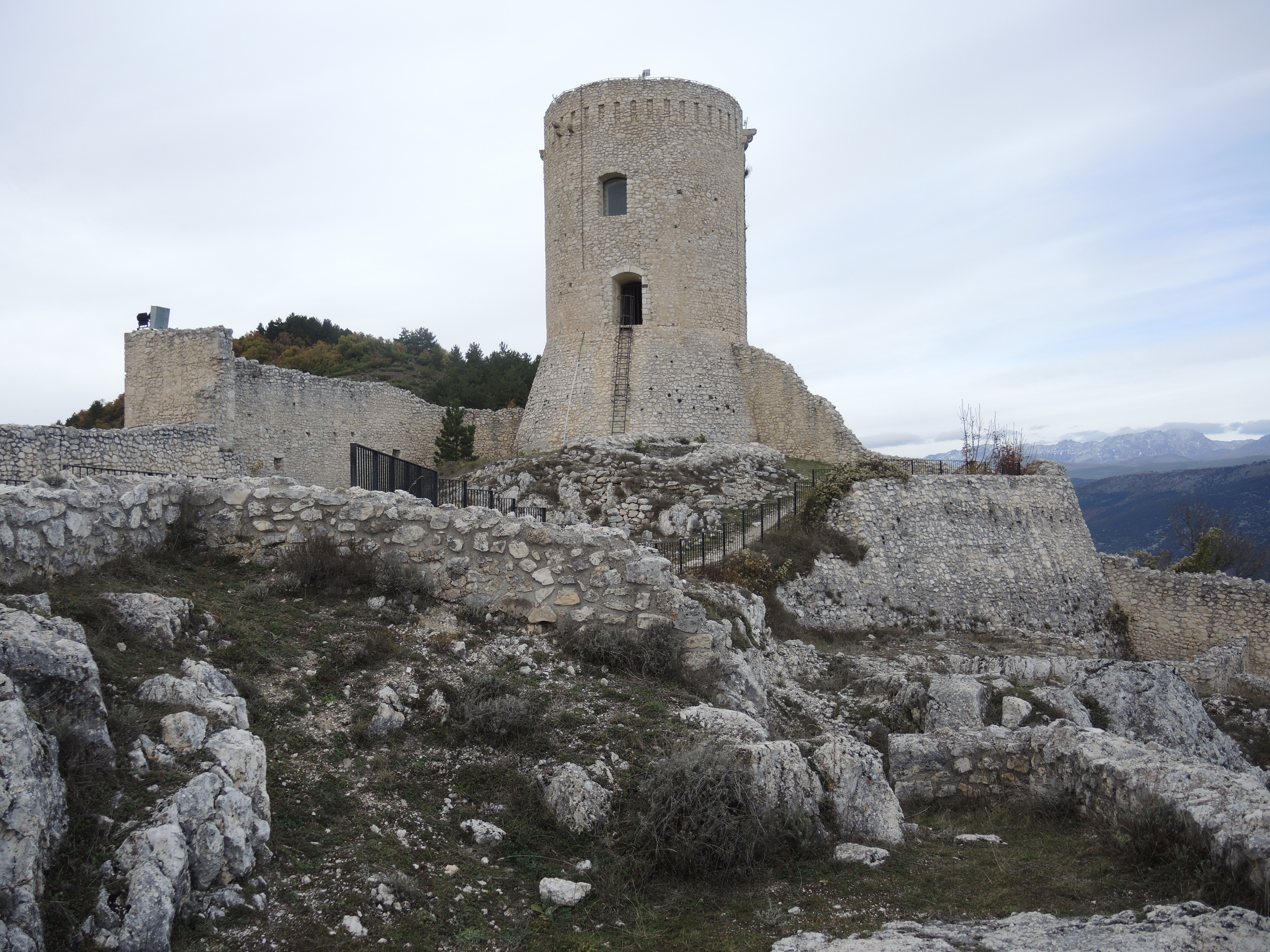
- Castle in Bominaco

Site information
- Type: Castle

Location
- Coordinates: 42.245767°N 13.660345°E

Site history
- Built: 12th-15th century

The Castle of Bominaco (Italian: Castello di Bominaco) is a medieval castle in Bominaco, Province of L'Aquila, Abruzzo, southern Italy.

== History ==
The castle of Bominaco is placed on top of the complex including the church of Santa Maria Assunta and the Oratory of San Pellegrino, in a commanding position on the plateau of Navelli.

The original structure dates back to the 12th century, but its current appearance comes from the destruction of the former castle by Braccio da Montone in 1424 and its reconstruction by the feudal lord of Bominaco Cyprian of Iacobuccio from Forfona, with permission of the Pope Martin V.

== Architecture ==
The castle walls have a trapezoidal plan, with squared towers in the middle. The highest point of the enclosure is defended by a strong cylindrical tower.

The interior of the enclosure still retains traces of complex masonry structures housed at the time.
