= Caporciano =

- Comune
- Comune di Caporciano
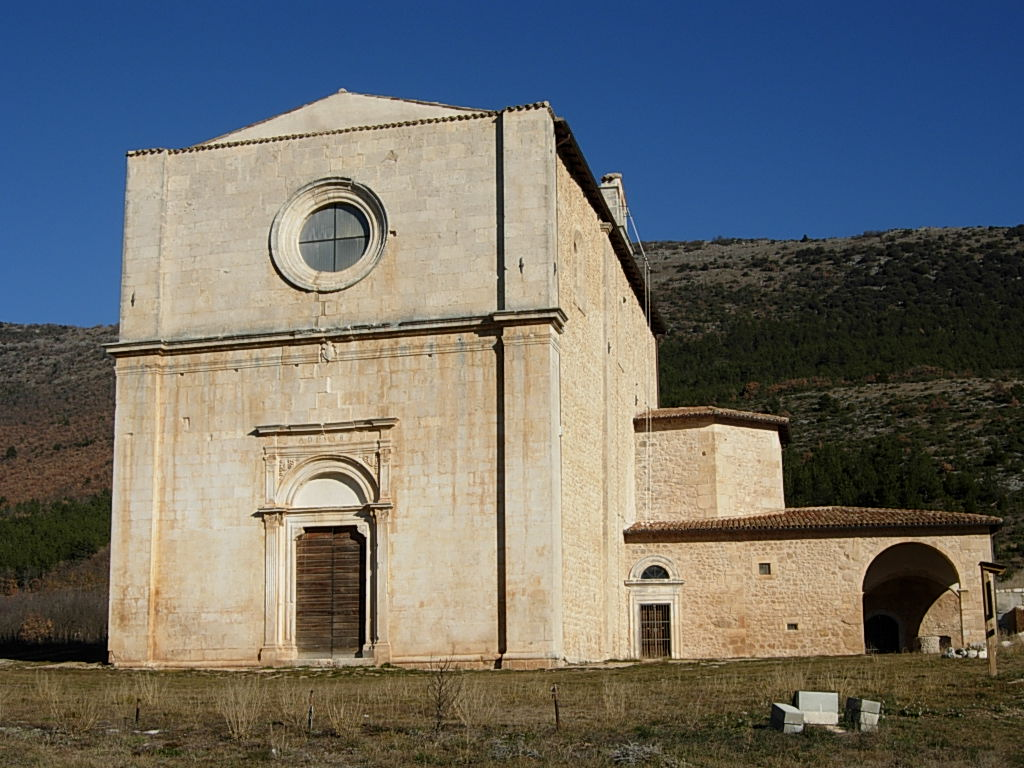
- Church of Santa Maria dei Cintorelli.

- Coat of arms

- Location within Italy Location within Abruzzo
- Coordinates: 42°15′6″N 13°40′26″E
- Country: Italy
- Region: Abruzzo
- Province: L'Aquila (AQ)
- Frazioni: Bominaco

Government
  - Mayor: Ivo Cassiani

Area
  - Total: 18.28 km^{2} (7.06 sq mi)
- Elevation: 836 m (2,743 ft)

Population (30 November 2014)
  - Total: 225
  - Density: 12.3/km^{2} (31.9/sq mi)
- Demonym: Caporcianesi
- Time zone: UTC+1 (CET)
  - Summer (DST): UTC+2 (CEST)
- Postal code: 67020
- Dialing code: 0862
- Saint day: 11 July
- Website: Official website

Caporciano is a town and comune in the province of L'Aquila, in the region of Abruzzo, southern Italy.

It is located about 20 minutes by car from L'Aquila, the capital of Abruzzo, in the plateau of Navelli. It is also about an hour from Pescara and about an hour and a half from Rome.

== Main sights ==
- Romanesque church of S. Peter. The building dates back to 12th the century and contains frescoes from the 15th century; the church itself was enlarged towards the end of the 14th century.
- church of S. Benedict the Abbot, built over the remains of an old castle. The bell tower adjacent to the church was once one of the castle's towers.
- A few kilometres away is the hamlet of Bominaco. It is home to two Benedictine churches (Saint Pellegrino and St. Mary): they date back to the Benedictine monastery that existed around the 10th century when the town's name was Momenaco. Bominaco is also home to a castle built by Benedictine monks to defend their property from the Saracens, who periodically raided this area from their strongholds further south.
- There are several archaeological reminders of Roman and other Italic peoples' presence in the area. The town's name itself is thought to come from Capo Giano (literally "head of Janus", the ancient Roman deity who could simultaneously see the past and the future) or from Casa Porciana (literally "house of pigs", referring to the continued large number of wild boars that roam the woods in the area).
