= Hermitage of Sant'Onofrio, Serramonacesca =

Hermitage in Serramonacesca, Italy

Coordinates: 42.2316°N 14.0846°E

Hermitage of Sant'Onofrio
- Eremo di Sant'Onofrio
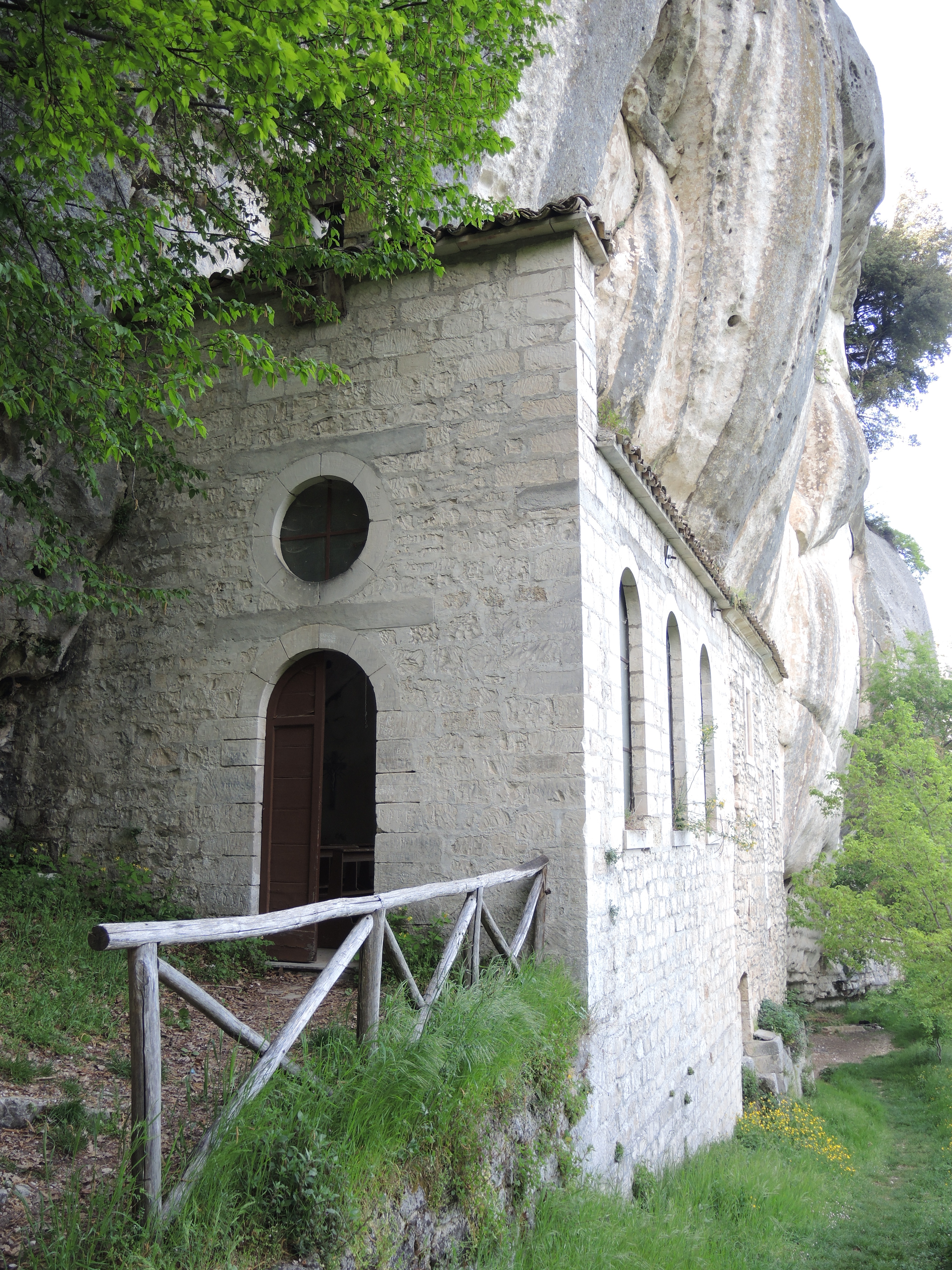
- View of the hermitage

- Location within Abruzzo

Religion
- Affiliation: Roman Catholic
- Province: Province of Pescara
- Region: Abruzzo

Location
- Municipality: Serramonacesca
- State: Italy

Architecture
- Completed: 11th century

Eremo di Sant'Onofrio (Italian for Hermitage of Sant'Onofrio) is an hermitage located in Serramonacesca, Province of Pescara (Abruzzo, Italy).

== History ==
It was built by the Benedictines of the Abbey of San Liberatore, utilizing some natural cavities, and then extensively expanded in 1948, particularly in height.

== Architecture ==
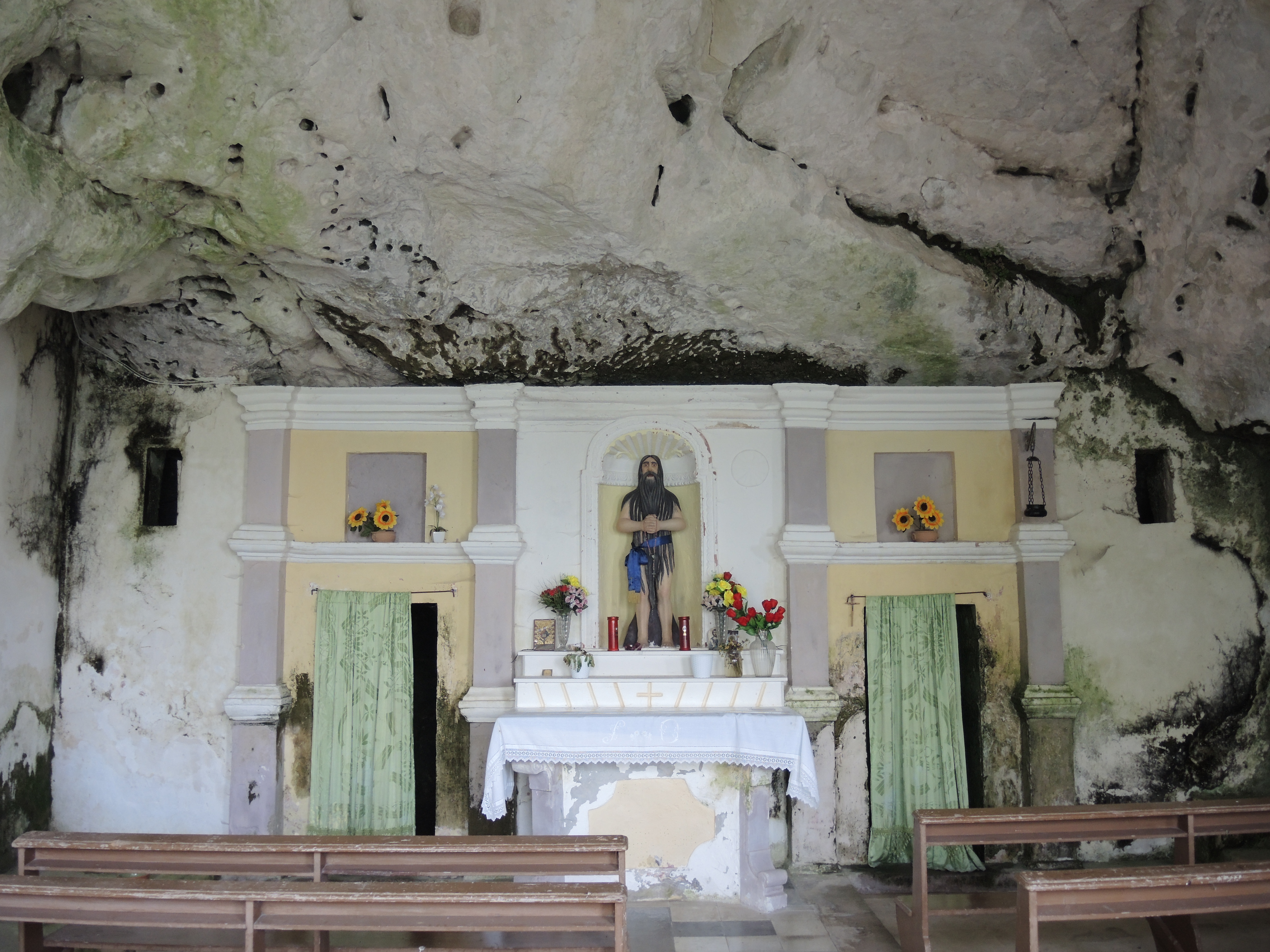
Interior

Inside the church, the old structure of the hermitage can be seen, particularly on the wall above the altar, where the holes for the poles supporting the old roof are visible.

Behind the altar, two doors lead to the ancient core of the hermitage. Through a low opening, one can access a still partially unexplored cave that preserves burial remains. There is also a bed-like structure called the Cradle of Sant'Onofrio, where believers lie down to seek healing.

Passing through an arch from the church, you enter a first transit room and then a second room that leads to the lower floor, characterized by a trapezoidal plan and a barrel vault, illuminated by a window located near the entrance.
