= San Liberatore a Maiella =

Abbey in Pescara, Italy

Coordinates: 42°14′08″N 14°05′59″E

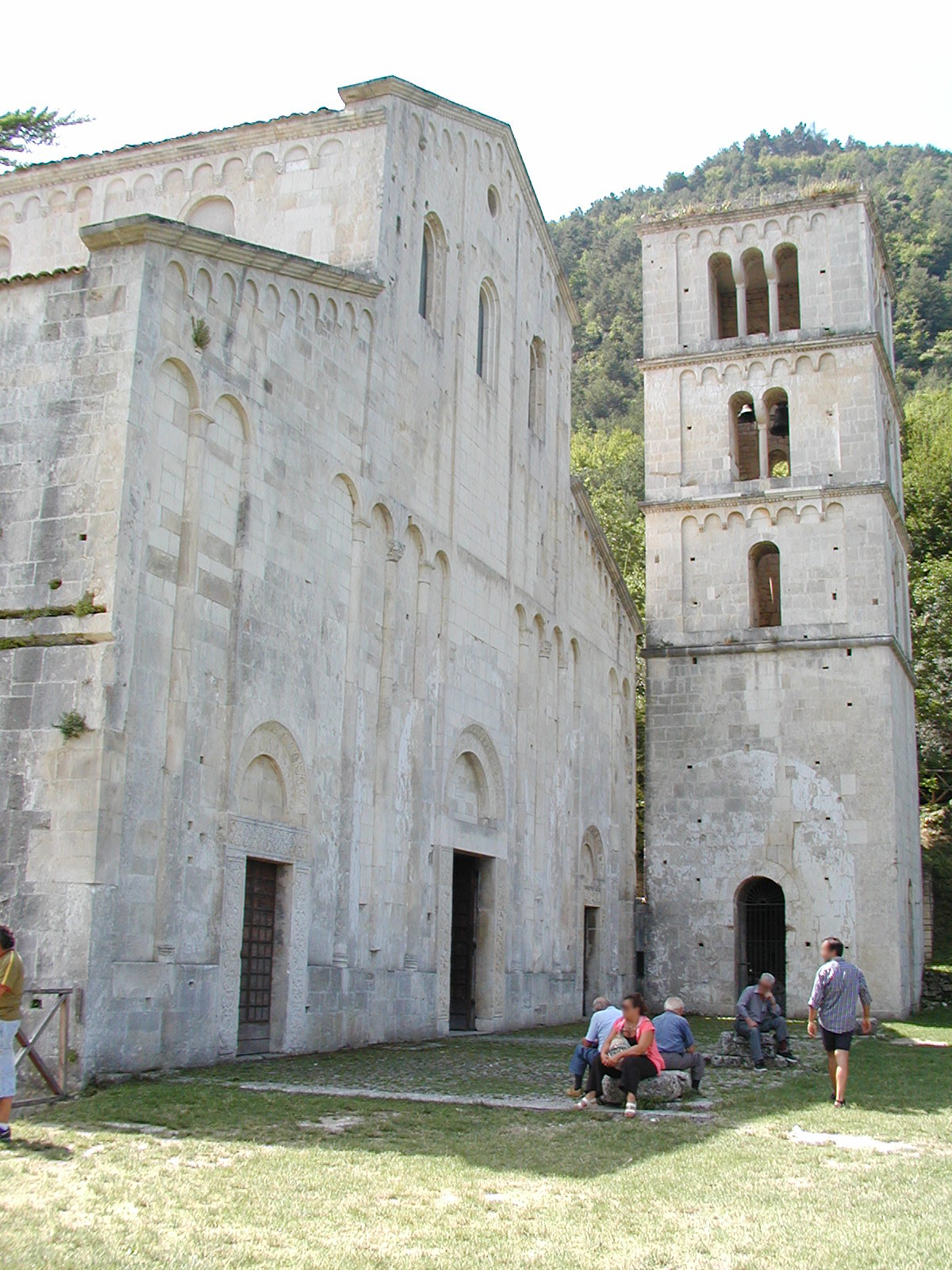
Façade and bell tower of the church abbey.

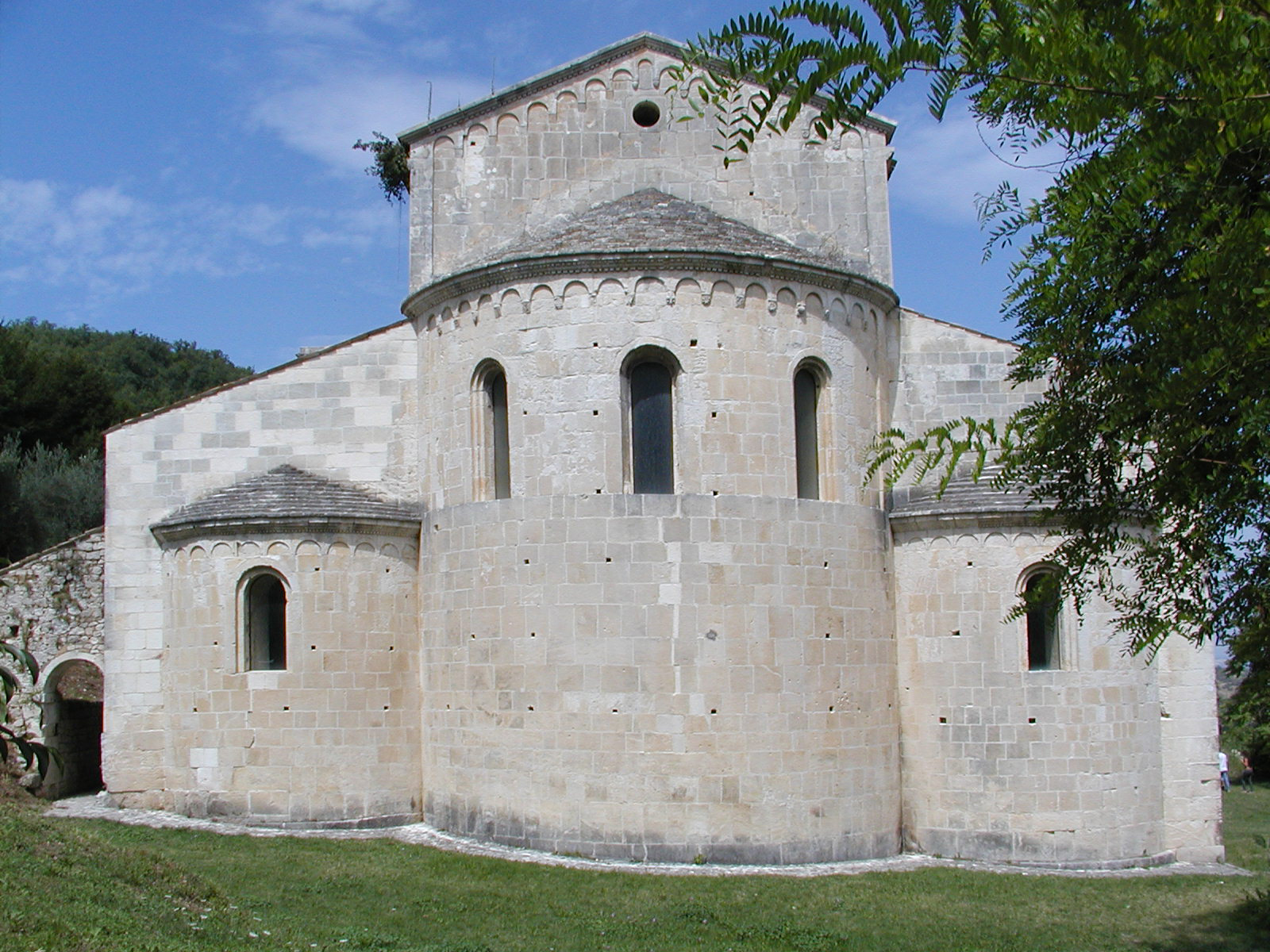
The apse.

San Liberatore a Maiella is an abbey and church in the territory of Serramonacesca, in the province of Pescara, region of Abruzzo, Italy.

== History ==
The origin of the abbey is traditionally linked to Charlemagne, who is portrayed in a fresco fragment within the church. The 9th century edifice was rebuilt a first time from 1007 by the Benedictine monk St. Theobald. It was meant to be dedicated to St. Liberator, but it is probably dedicated to Jesus the Liberator instead.

The current edifice, however, is that rebuilt starting from 1080 by Desiderius, abbot of Montecassino.

The church remained in a decaying state until it was restored in 1967-1971.

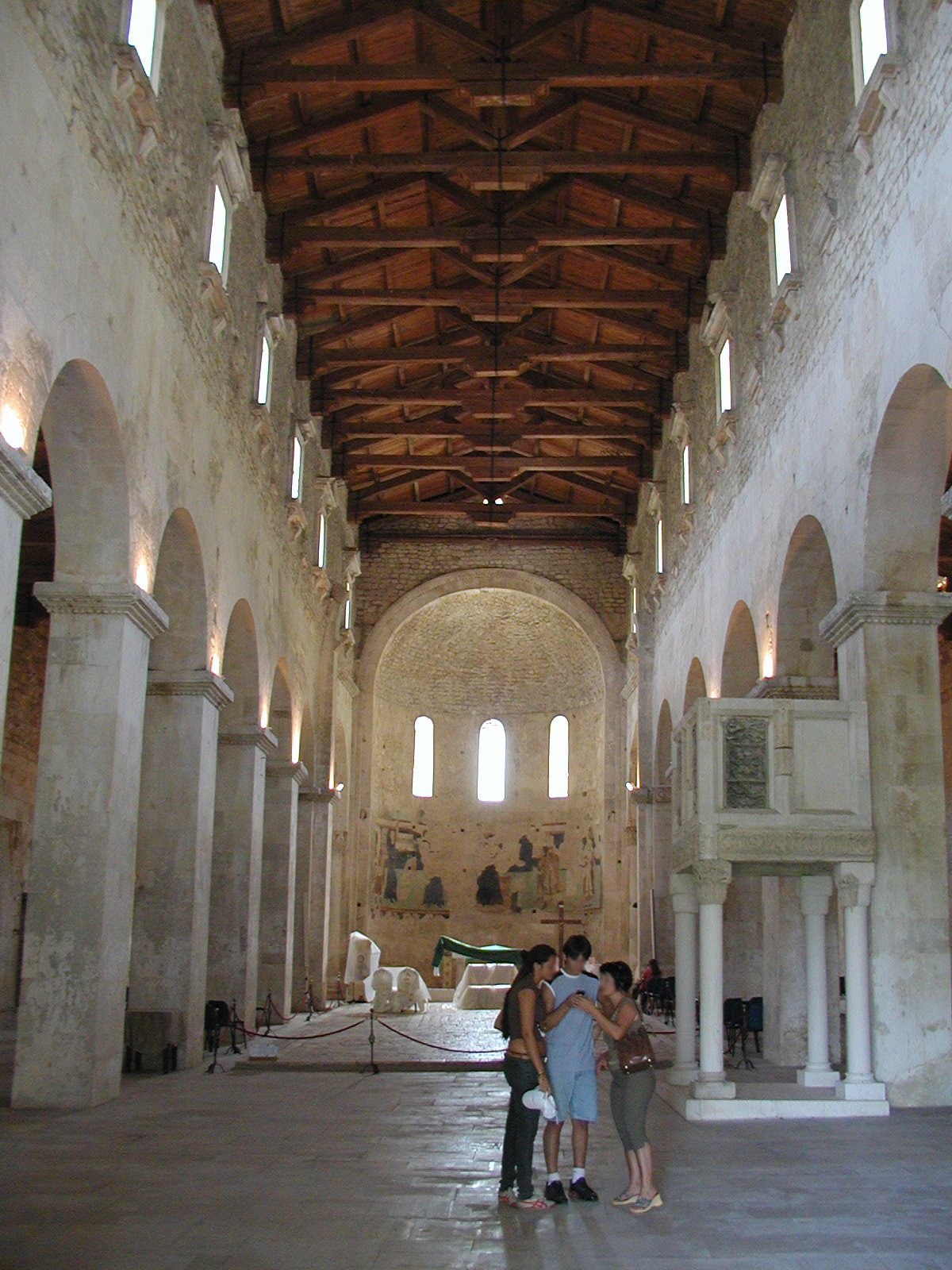
View of the nave with the ambo on the right.

== Architecture ==
The abbey has a white façade with balanced volumes, flanked by a square-plan bell tower with three floors, having (starting from the lowest) single, double and triple mullioned windows. The façade has vertical relief in Lombard-Romanesque styles.

The interior is on the basilica plan with a nave and two aisles, divided by seven round arcades with triangular piers.

The triumphal arches (the central one is now missing) led to the presbytery. The arches are supported by cruciform pilasters which end with notable decorations, in a style similar to that of the nave's walls. The ceiling has wooden trusses. In the left aisles are the former accesses to the cloister and the monastery residential quarters, represented by two decorated doors. One has in its tympanum the typical flower motif of the Abruzzese Romanesque style.

The nave's pavement has a rare pavement geometrical decoration which dates from c. 1200.

The apse has frescoes from various ages, once united but now, after their restoration, separated: the one portraying Theobald in from the 16th century, while the second, with traces of saints' figures, is from the 12th century.

The ambo has a square shape, and is similar to those in the San Clemente Abbey of Casauria and in that of San Pelino at Corfinio.
