= Tre Nevi =

Ski resort in Abruzzo, Italy

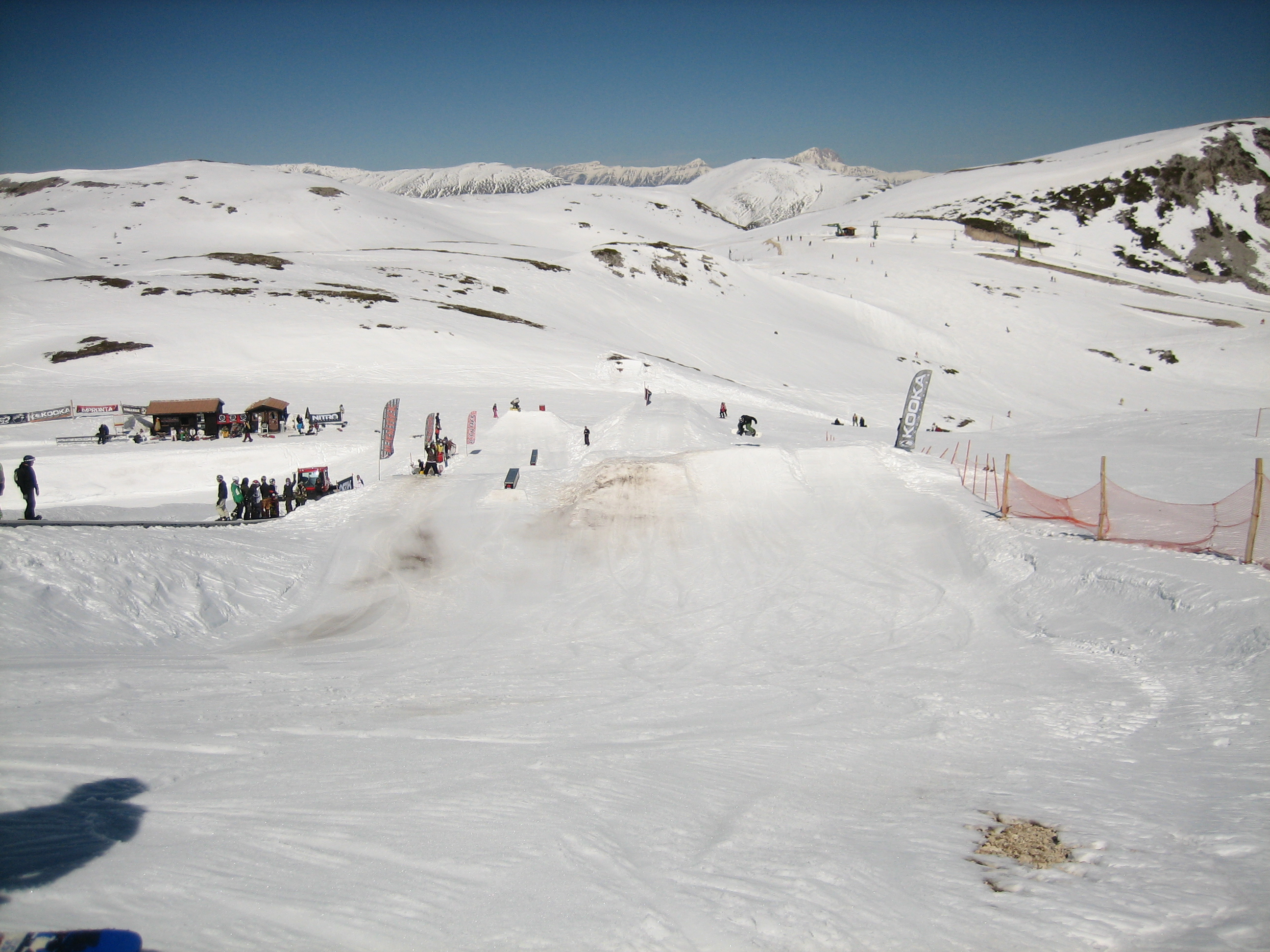
- Interactive map of Tre Nevi
- Location: Abruzzo, Italy
- Nearest city: Ovindoli, Lucoli, Rocca di Cambio
- Top elevation: Campofelice-1916 m, Ovindoli-2056 m, Campo Imperatore-2235 m
- Base elevation: Campo Felice 1411 m, Ovindoli 1505 m, Campo Imperatore 1115 m
- Skiable area: 64 km of runs
- Trails: 64km total; 16,2km easy; 27,8km intermediate; 17,1km difficult
- Lift system: 31 lifts
- Website: www.campofelice.it/ita/s-stagionalideiparchi.php

Tre Nevi is one of the most important ski areas of Southern Italy, located in the Apennine Mountains, in Abruzzo. Created in 1997, it is made up of three ski resorts, hence the name of the area: the first two are Campo Felice, with the two slopes of Lucoli and Rocca di Cambio, and Ovindoli, both included between Monte Velino, Monte Magnola and Monte Sirente, within the Sirente-Velino Regional Park, while the third is the more distant station of Campo Imperatore, on the Gran Sasso.

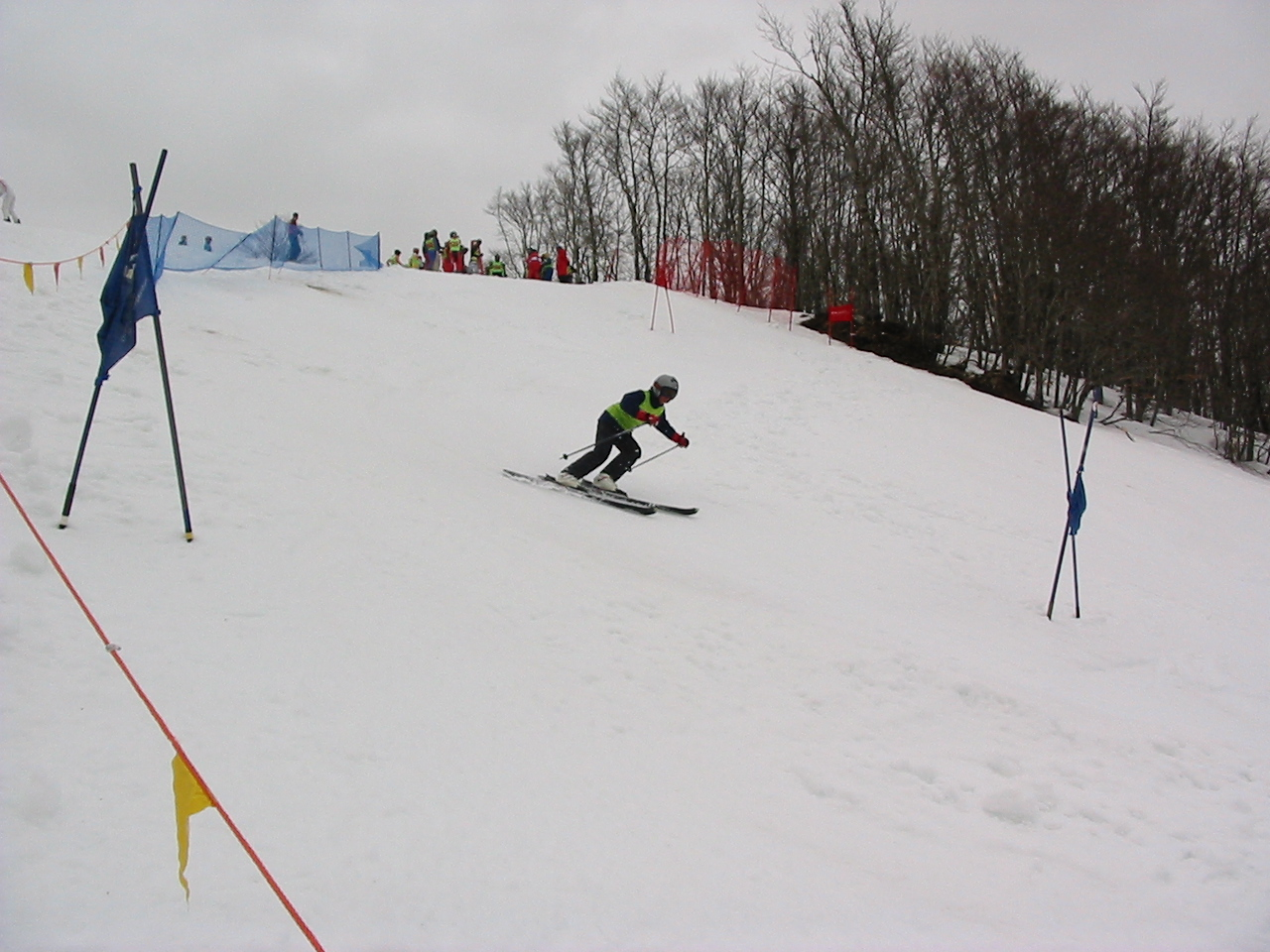
Ski race in Campo Felice

== Ski areas ==
The area consists of three ski areas:

1. Campo Imperatore
2. Ovindoli
3. Campo Felice

== Ski slopes and circuits ==
The district has 30 kilometers of slopes in Campo Felice, 15 kilometers of slopes in Campo Imperatore, 60 for cross-country skiing and 30 kilometers of slopes in Ovindoli served by important and varied infrastructures. Both in Campo Felice and in Ovindoli there are also ring tracks for cross-country skiing. The ski courses are managed by the Tre Nevi Ski Club, which is part of the homonymous sports center based in Rocca di Mezzo. The consortium offers a single seasonal and multi-day ski pass. For the two ski resorts of Campo Felice and Ovindoli, located a short distance away but separate, the will has been expressed several times to connect the respective ski lifts and slopes through an appropriate project, now decided to start with the development protocol for Abruzzo after the 2009 earthquake.
