= Massa d'Albe =

- Comune
- Comune di Massa d'Albe
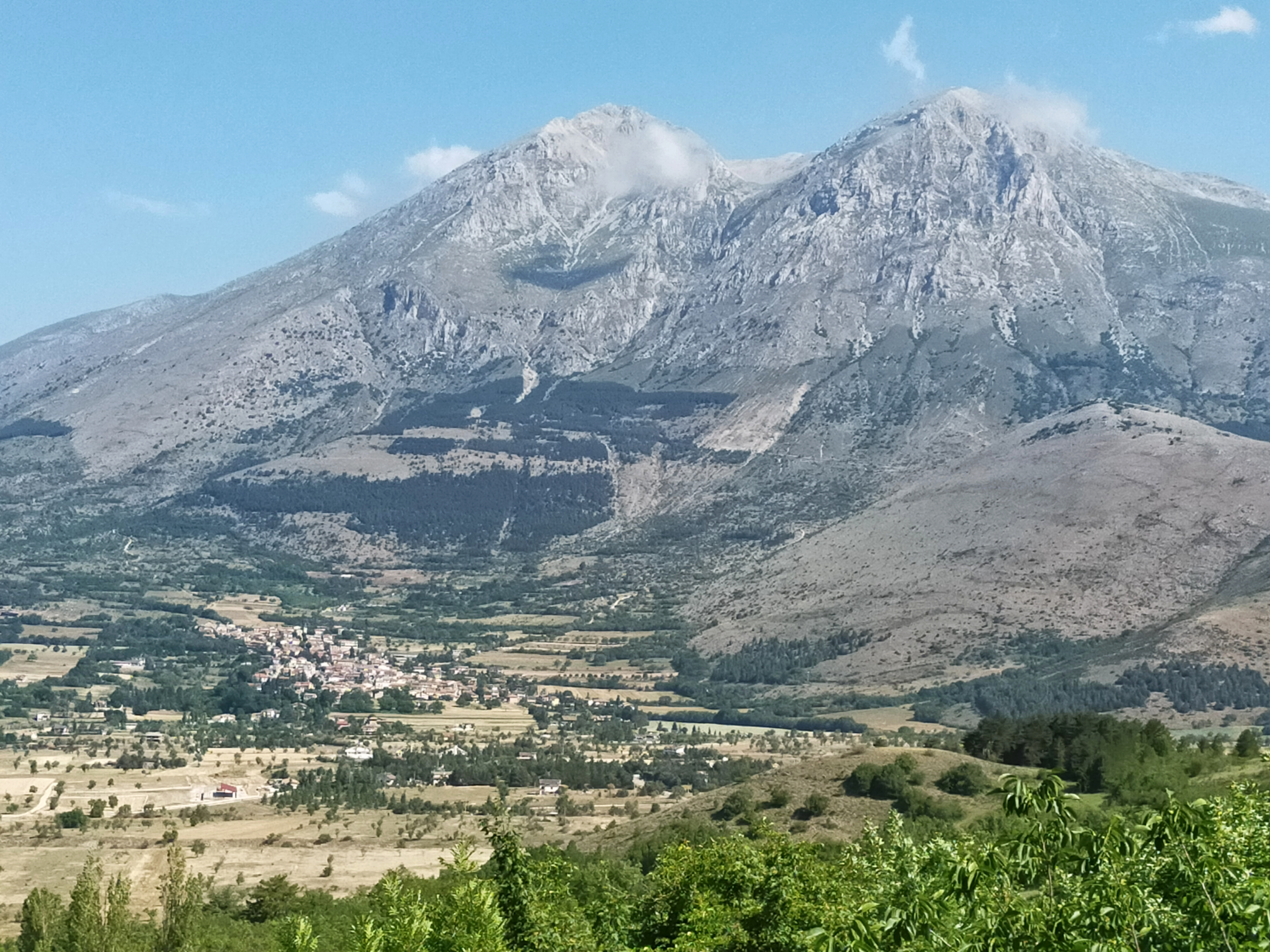
- The town with the Monte Velino in the background.

- Coat of arms

- Location within Italy Location within Abruzzo
- Coordinates: 42°6′30″N 13°23′43″E
- Country: Italy
- Region: Abruzzo
- Province: L'Aquila (AQ)
- Frazioni: Albe, Forme

Government
  - Mayor: Nazzareno Lucci

Area
  - Total: 68.33 km^{2} (26.38 sq mi)
- Elevation: 865 m (2,838 ft)

Population (30 November 2017)
  - Total: 1,460
  - Density: 21.4/km^{2} (55.3/sq mi)
- Demonym: Massetani
- Time zone: UTC+1 (CET)
  - Summer (DST): UTC+2 (CEST)
- Postal code: 67050
- Dialing code: 0863
- Patron saint: Simplicius, Constantius, and Victorianus
- Saint day: 26 August
- Website: Official website

Massa d'Albe is a comune and town in the province of L'Aquila in the Abruzzo region of central Italy. It is part of the Marsica.

The town was founded in the 14th century by the inhabitants of the ancient Alba Fucens, whose remains are in the area. The current comune was formed after 1915 by the union of two former comuni, Massa and Corona, destroyed by an earthquake.

== Geography ==
The central nucleus of the inhabited area lies on the south-western slopes of Mount Velino, one of the highest peaks of the central Apennines (2,487 m). Part of the territory is included in the Sirente-Velino Regional Park and in the Monte Velino Natural Reserve.

In a gorge of the mountainous group of Velino opens the Bocca di Teve (987 m) situated at the beginning of the homonymous valley that marks the border of Abruzzo with Lazio and with the Montagne della Duchessa Regional Reserve.

The comune includes the built-up area of Massa and the frazioni of Alba Fucens and Forme. The archaeological site of Alba Fucens is situated few kilometers away from the communal chief town. The pass of Fonte Capo la Maina connects the territory to Ovindoli and to the ski resort of Mount Magnola.

== Climate ==
Climate data for Massa d'Albe, elevation 856 m (2,808 ft), (1951–2000)
Month	Jan	Feb	Mar	Apr	May	Jun	Jul	Aug	Sep	Oct	Nov	Dec	Year
Record high °C (°F)	22.5 (72.5)	23.0 (73.4)	24.0 (75.2)	28.0 (82.4)	32.0 (89.6)	35.5 (95.9)	37.0 (98.6)	40.0 (104.0)	35.0 (95.0)	29.0 (84.2)	25.0 (77.0)	20.0 (68.0)	40.0 (104.0)
Mean daily maximum °C (°F)	7.3 (45.1)	8.5 (47.3)	11.3 (52.3)	14.5 (58.1)	20.0 (68.0)	23.7 (74.7)	27.1 (80.8)	27.2 (81.0)	22.9 (73.2)	17.5 (63.5)	11.2 (52.2)	7.4 (45.3)	16.6 (61.8)
Daily mean °C (°F)	2.5 (36.5)	3.2 (37.8)	5.7 (42.3)	8.5 (47.3)	13.3 (55.9)	16.6 (61.9)	19.3 (66.7)	19.5 (67.1)	15.9 (60.6)	11.2 (52.2)	6.2 (43.2)	2.8 (37.0)	10.4 (50.7)
Mean daily minimum °C (°F)	−2.2 (28.0)	−2.1 (28.2)	0.1 (32.2)	2.5 (36.5)	6.5 (43.7)	9.5 (49.1)	11.5 (52.7)	11.7 (53.1)	8.9 (48.0)	4.9 (40.8)	1.0 (33.8)	−1.7 (28.9)	4.2 (39.6)
Record low °C (°F)	−16.0 (3.2)	−14.0 (6.8)	−15.0 (5.0)	−11.0 (12.2)	−6.5 (20.3)	−1.0 (30.2)	−0.5 (31.1)	0.5 (32.9)	−3.0 (26.6)	−8.5 (16.7)	−12.0 (10.4)	−15.0 (5.0)	−16.0 (3.2)
Average precipitation mm (inches)	59.9 (2.36)	67.0 (2.64)	58.6 (2.31)	73.1 (2.88)	56.4 (2.22)	53.8 (2.12)	32.8 (1.29)	41.3 (1.63)	61.7 (2.43)	85.2 (3.35)	112.7 (4.44)	96.3 (3.79)	798.8 (31.46)
Average precipitation days	8	8	9	10	9	7	5	5	6	9	10	10	96
Source: Regione Abruzzo

== See also ==
- Alba Fucens
- Castello Orsini
