= Piani di Pezza =

Coordinates: 42.1831°N 13.4579°E

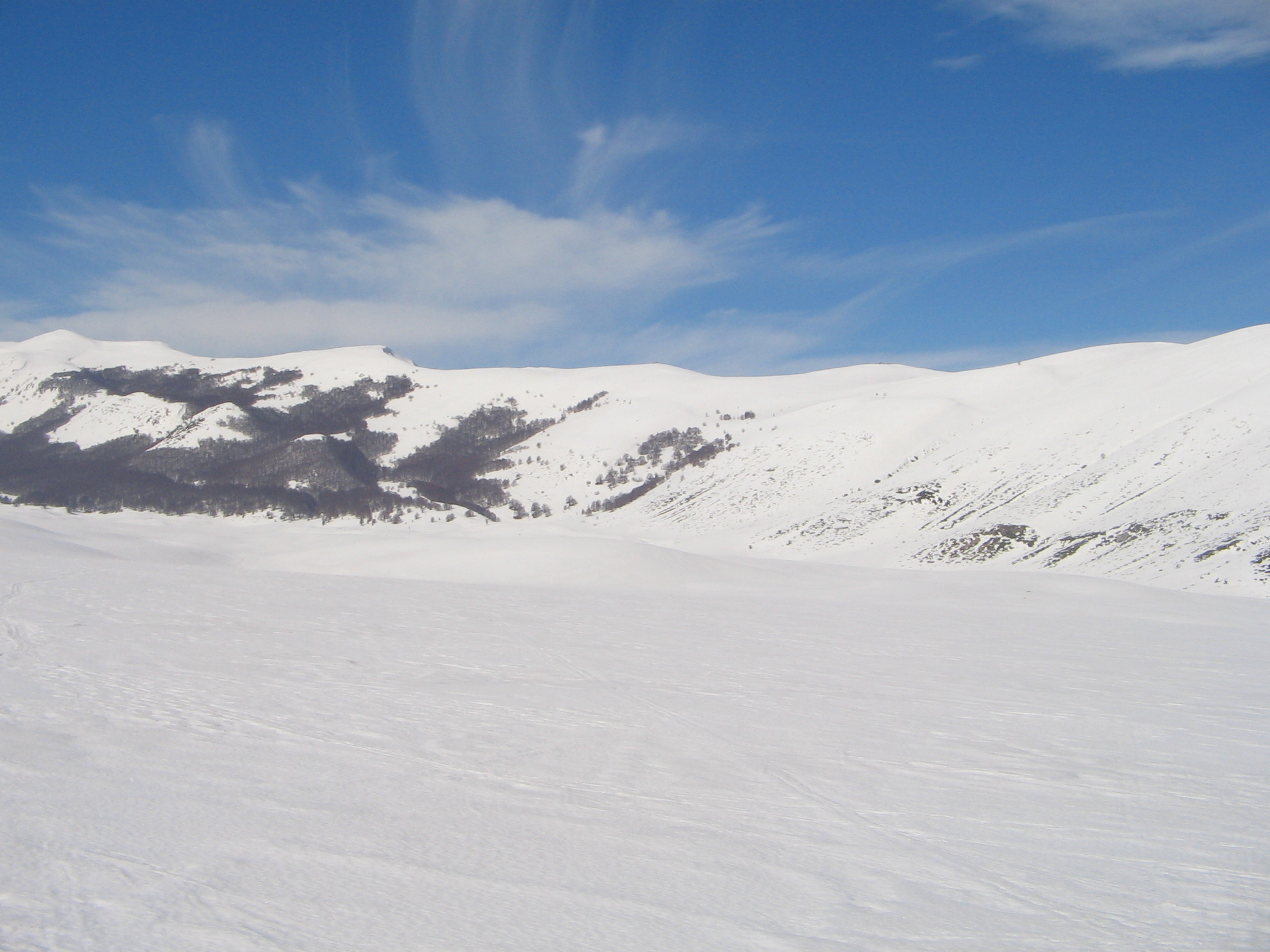
Winter view.

The Piani di Pezza is a glacial-karstic-alluvial plain in the province of L'Aquila, Abruzzo, central Italy. It is part of the Sirente-Velino Regional Park, located at an altitude of 1400/150 m above the sea level.

The plain measures some 5.5 x 3 km, and is surrounded by the Velino-Sirente chain. The Campo Felice and Altopiano delle Rocche plains are located nearby. Vegetation is scarce, concentrated on the northern mountain slopes where are some beech woods.

The temperature can reach -30 °C in winter
