= Albe =

Albe may refer to:

- Albé, a commune in France
- Albe (river), a tributary of the Saar in northeastern France
- Massa d'Albe, a comune in Italy
  - Albe (Massa d'Albe), a frazione in Italy
- Elbling, a grape variety also known as Albe

== People with the surname ==
- Alicia Albe (born 1977), American rhythmic gymnast
- Denise Albe-Fessard (1916–2003), French neuroscientist

== See also ==
- Alba (disambiguation)
