= Campo Felice =

Karstic plateau in central Apennines

Coordinates: 42°12′57″N 13°26′53″E

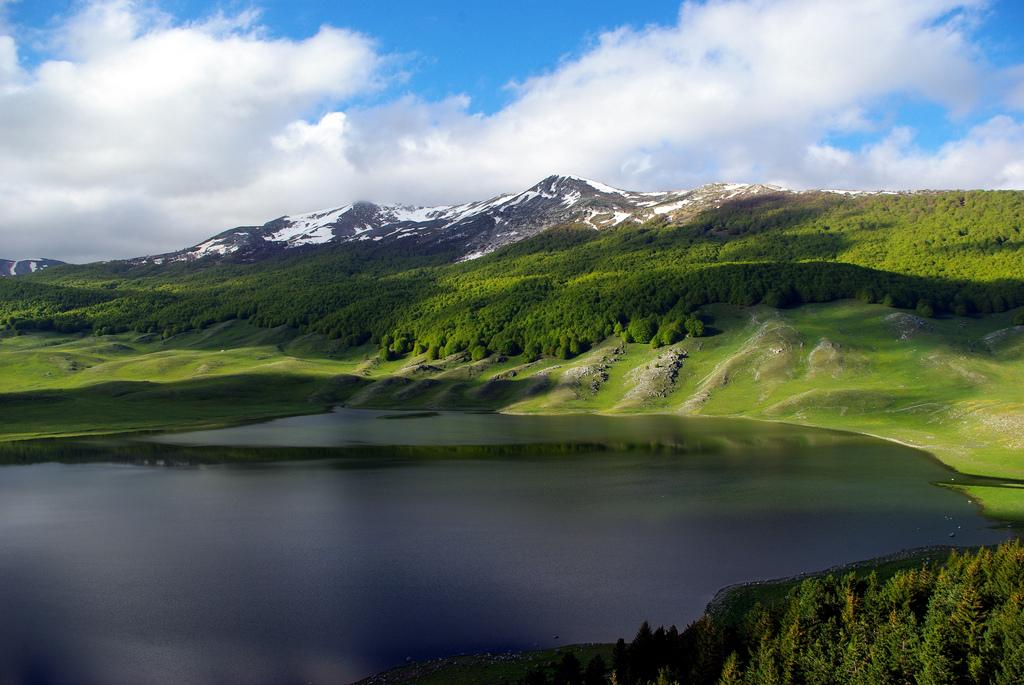
Campo Felice lake in spring.

Campo Felice is a karstic plateau in the central Apennines, included in the province of L'Aquila, Abruzzo, central Italy.

Included in the communal territories of Lucoli and Rocca di Cambio, in the Sirente-Velino Regional Park, it is geographically bounded by the Velino-Sirente chain, with the other plains of Piani di Pezza and Altopiano delle Rocche located nearby. Campo Felice is situated at some 1500 m above the sea level, and has the shape of a basin. Vegetation is scarce, mostly composed by beech woods in the surrounding mountains slopes.

Temperatures can reach -30° C in winter. It is the seat of the eponymous Tre Nevi ski resort.

== See also ==
- Campo Imperatore
