= Avezzano concentration camp =

Italian internment camp during World War I

Avezzano
- Internment camp
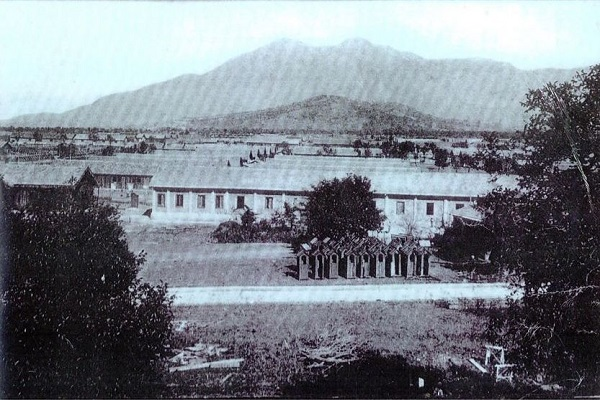
- View of the imprisonment camp during World War I

- Location within Italy
- Coordinates: 42°02′53.6″N 13°25′12.9″E
- Location: Avezzano, Italy
- Operated by: Kingdom of Italy
- Operational: 1916–1945

Avezzano concentration camp was an Italian assembly and detention camp set up in 1916 in Avezzano, Abruzzo, during World War I, immediately after the 1915 Marsica earthquake that almost completely destroyed it, decimating the population. The camp was reserved to about 15,000 prisoners from the Austro-Hungarian army, mainly of Czech–Slovak, Polish, German, and Hungarian nationalities; Romanians, who were gathered in the Romanian Legion of Italy by the end of the conflict, had a garrison and a training camp in Avezzano. Mostly abandoned in 1920, a sector was reused in World War II to house British, Indian and New Zealand prisoners of war.

== World War I ==
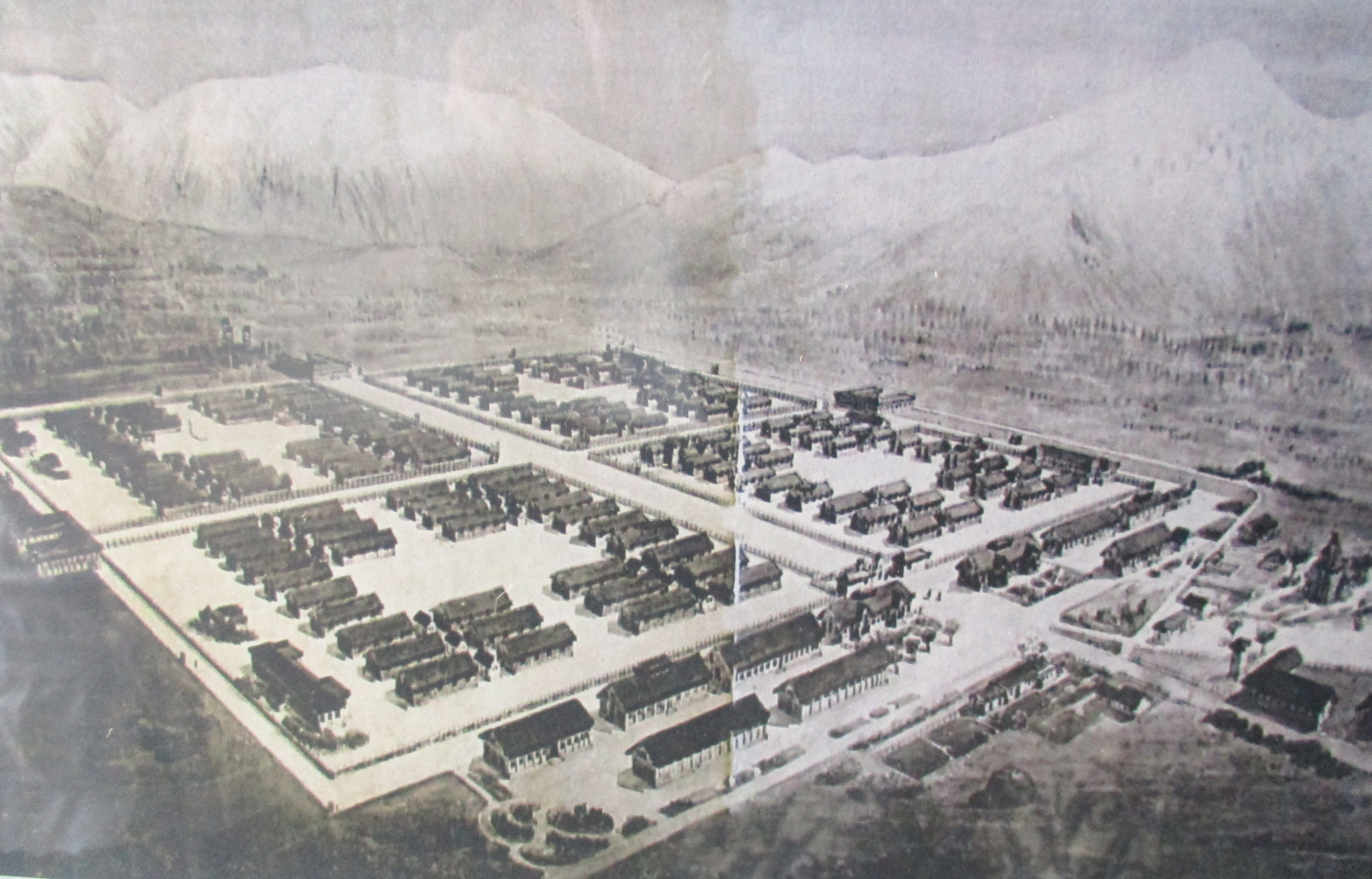
India ink drawing reproducing the camp with a bird's eye perspective (author unknown, 1920)

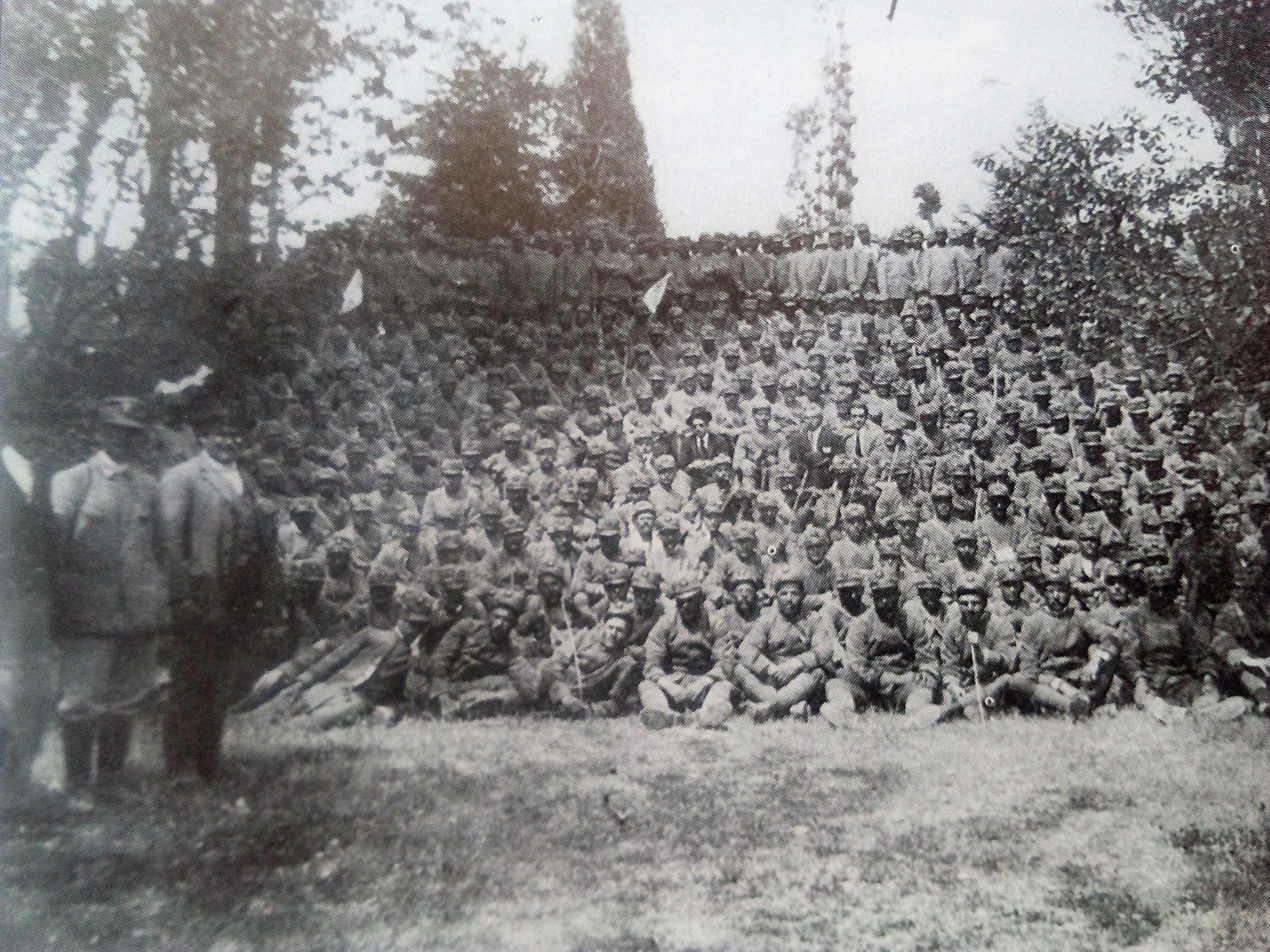
Members of the Romanian Legion of Italy visiting the "Fucino Incile" (Fucine Inlet - July 1918)

A few months before the Kingdom of Italy's official entry into World War I, the disastrous 1915 earthquake almost completely destroyed the city of Avezzano, razing to the ground a lot of centers in Marsica and the nearby provinces as well. Because of the earthquake, the city recorded a population loss of about 90%. Despite everything, the few young men who had survived and belonged to the age classes of the last years of the nineteenth century were not exempted from military service and were called to the recruitment in the army at war and to the mobilization towards the Karst Plateau. In a short time, the youth who had survived the earthquake had to abandon the devastated areas, leaving a real generation void.

In order to support the reconstruction of the city, in the second half of 1916 the Salandra government decided to install Central Italy's largest concentration camp for Austro-Hungarian war prisoners. Capable to house about 15,000 internees and 1,000 Royal Italian Army officers and soldiers in charge of guard, the camp also had a larger extension than Abruzzo internment camps and Servigliano imprisonment camp. Officially coded as PG091, the camp was located in an area north of the city, in a piece of land of about 33 hectares (82 acres), where 192 masonry and wooden pavilions were erected for prisoners' shelter and logistical services.

Besides the military engineering warehouse-office, built near the Cimarosa Cottage (Villino Cimarosa), several urbanization and logistics works were carried out in the camp: the military command-house, the small hospital, the sutler's shop, the stores, the guard building, the internal road system, the water plant connected to the Tre Conche reservoirs through 12-kilometre (7.5 mi) pipes, the almost 8-kilometre-long (5.0 mi) sewing network, the power network system.

=== Prisoners' works ===
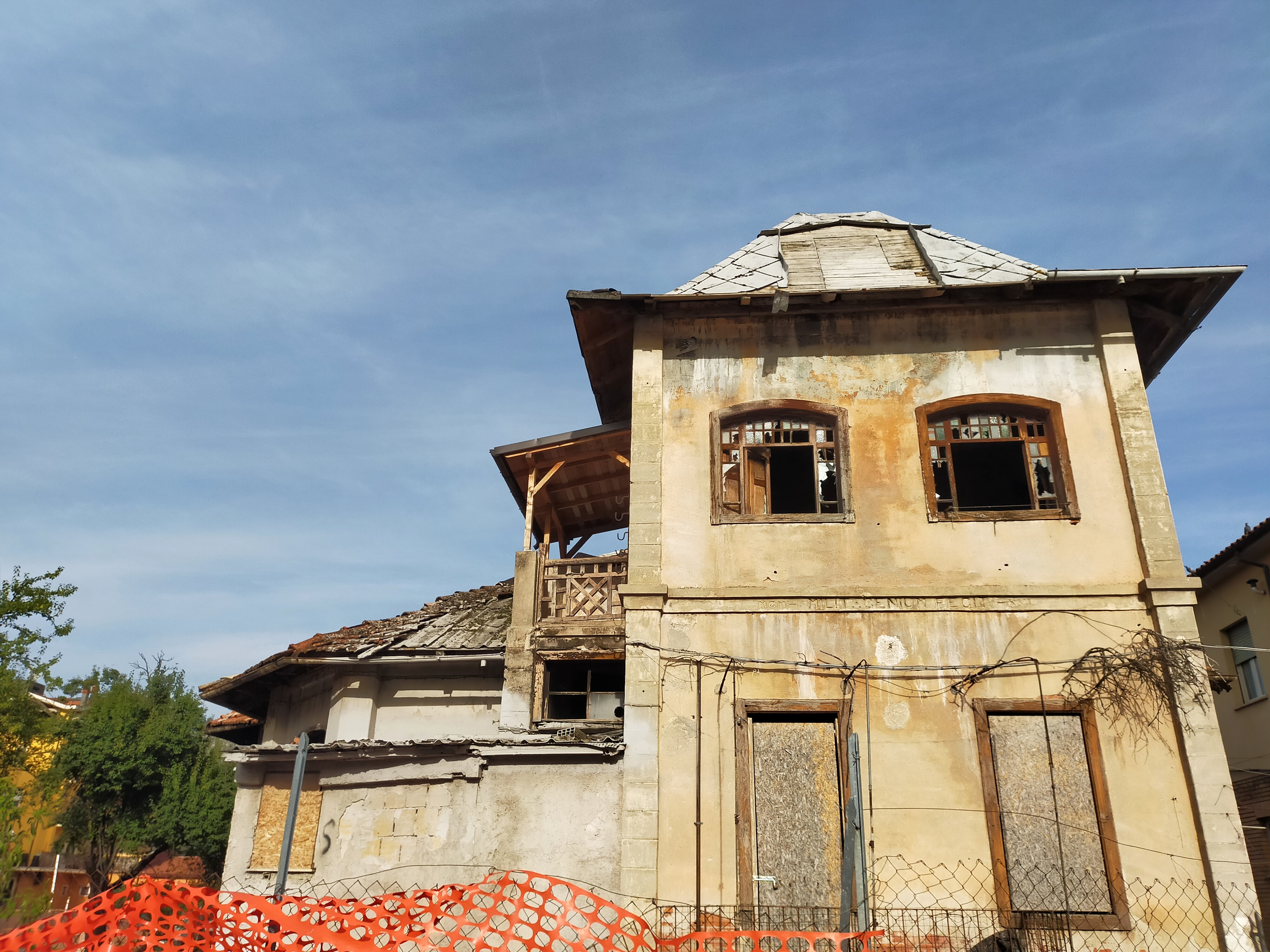
The Villino Cimarosa ("Cimarosa Cottage"), formerly the military engineering office headquarters

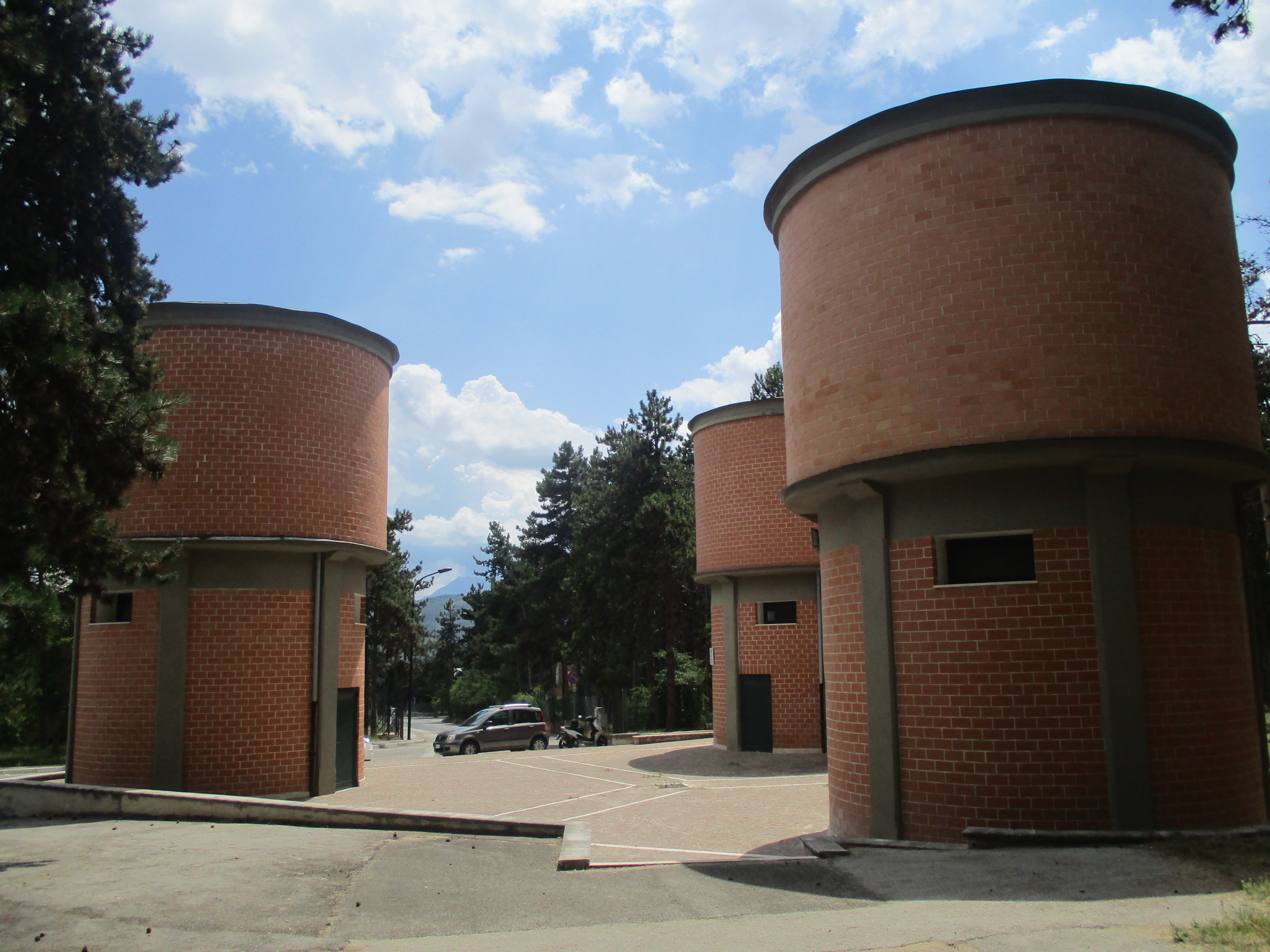
The Tre Conche ("Three Reservoirs")

The prisoners of Avezzano concentration camp were engaged, in observance of the international directives established by the Geneva Convention, in a number of works such as removal of the rubble from the 1915 earthquake, co-operation to the reconstruction of the new city through the building of roads and public buildings, agricultural works in the Fucino fields left uncultivated, reclamation of rivers and streams, planting of the pinewood with the primary purpose of protecting the area from the frosty winds coming in winter from Mount Velino, afforestation of Mount Salviano and Mount Tino in Celano and extraordinary repairs to the municipal cemetery. There were also requests for help by the mountain municipalities of Marsica and the province on the occasion of natural disasters, such as the heavy winter snowfalls.

=== The cemetery ===
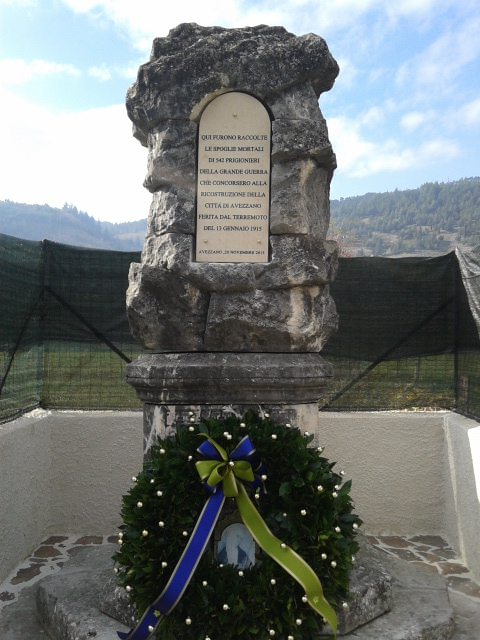
Monument to the former cemetery in Chiusa Resta

The cemetery was erected in a distant position from the prison in the location of Chiusa Resta, an area already used for cemeterial services since 1656, the year of the Great Plague. The burial place was closed in 1881 owing to the necessity to build, along the road to Luco dei Marsi near the Church of St Mary in Vico, a municipal cemetery which was safer from the health point of view and more suitable for the city's new needs, during a period of demographic and social growth. While deceased officers were buried next to the St Mary in Vico cemetery, the Chiusa Resta graveyard was set up again to accommodate the corpses of the 850 Bohemian, Czech–Slovak, Croatian, Polish, Serbian, German, Hungarian internees and Romanians from Banat, Bukovina and Transilvania who had died between 1917 and 1919. Almost all corpses, about 770, were exhumed between 1969 and 1991 in order to be moved to the Asiago War Memorial. The dismantlement of the cemetery officially occurred beginning in 1991. In 2007, following the further building expansion of this area, it was arranged for the last remains to be exhumed and returned to foreign authorities.

=== Abolition of the camp ===
At the end of the war, prisoners had to wait several months before returning home, because of the territorial disputes among the new states born in Central and Eastern Europe. On 23 September 1920, Deputy Camillo Corradini obtained the free transfer of several buildings, including the Cimarosa Cottage, in favour of the Avezzano municipality. Some huts and pavilions were also transferred to Italian State Civil Engineering and Italian State Railways, while most of the occupied land was returned to its owners.

== World War II ==
During World War II, a sector of the concentration camp was reopened to confine prisoners from the Allied forces who opposed the Axis powers. Put under the control of the Royal Italian Army and later of German units, the camp housed British, Indian and New Zealand prisoners of war. During the war, German general Albert Kesselring had his headquarters, with more than 200 officers and about 1,000 soldiers, established near the Castello Orsini. The city of Avezzano, having become a transit place at the service of German troops, suffered heavy damage from Allied bombing raids, which caused several civilian casualties and damages to 70% of the architectural heritage restored a few years after the 1915 Avezzano earthquake. During the bombing raids, many prisoners of war escaped from the camp, managing to find shelter in Marsica mountain villages or in the most inaccessible areas of the Abruzzi Apennines.

=== Dismantlement of the camp ===
The definitive dismantlement of the camp occurred in the years after World War II: most huts were demolished or replaced with modern buildings, including the one used as a church. Few ruins and the foundations of some masonry pavilions are still visible inside the pinewood. The remains of the electricity substation of Roveto Electrical company lie between Don Minzoni and Fosse Ardeatine streets, in the modern Borgo Pineta district. The Tre Conche reservoirs, restored several times, are located inside the pinewood, while the Cimarosa Cottage is placed sideways to the Church of Madonna del Passo.

== Bibliography ==
- Ciranna, Simonetta; Montuori, Patrizia (2015). Avezzano, la Marsica e il circondario a cento anni dal sisma del 1915: città e territori tra cancellazione e reinvenzione (in Italian). L'Aquila: Consiglio Regionale dell'Abruzzo. SBN IT\ICCU\RMS\2695461.
- Maccallini, Enzo; Losardo, Lucio (1996). Prigionieri di guerra ad Avezzano: il campo di concentramento, memorie da salvare (in Italian). Avezzano: Archeoclub d'Italia, Sezione della Marsica. SBN IT\ICCU\AQ1\0038012.
- Palmieri, Eliseo (2006). Avezzano, un secolo di immagini (in Italian). Pescara: Paolo de Siena. SBN IT\ICCU\TER\0011256.
