= Rocca di Cambio =

- Comune
- Comune di Rocca di Cambio
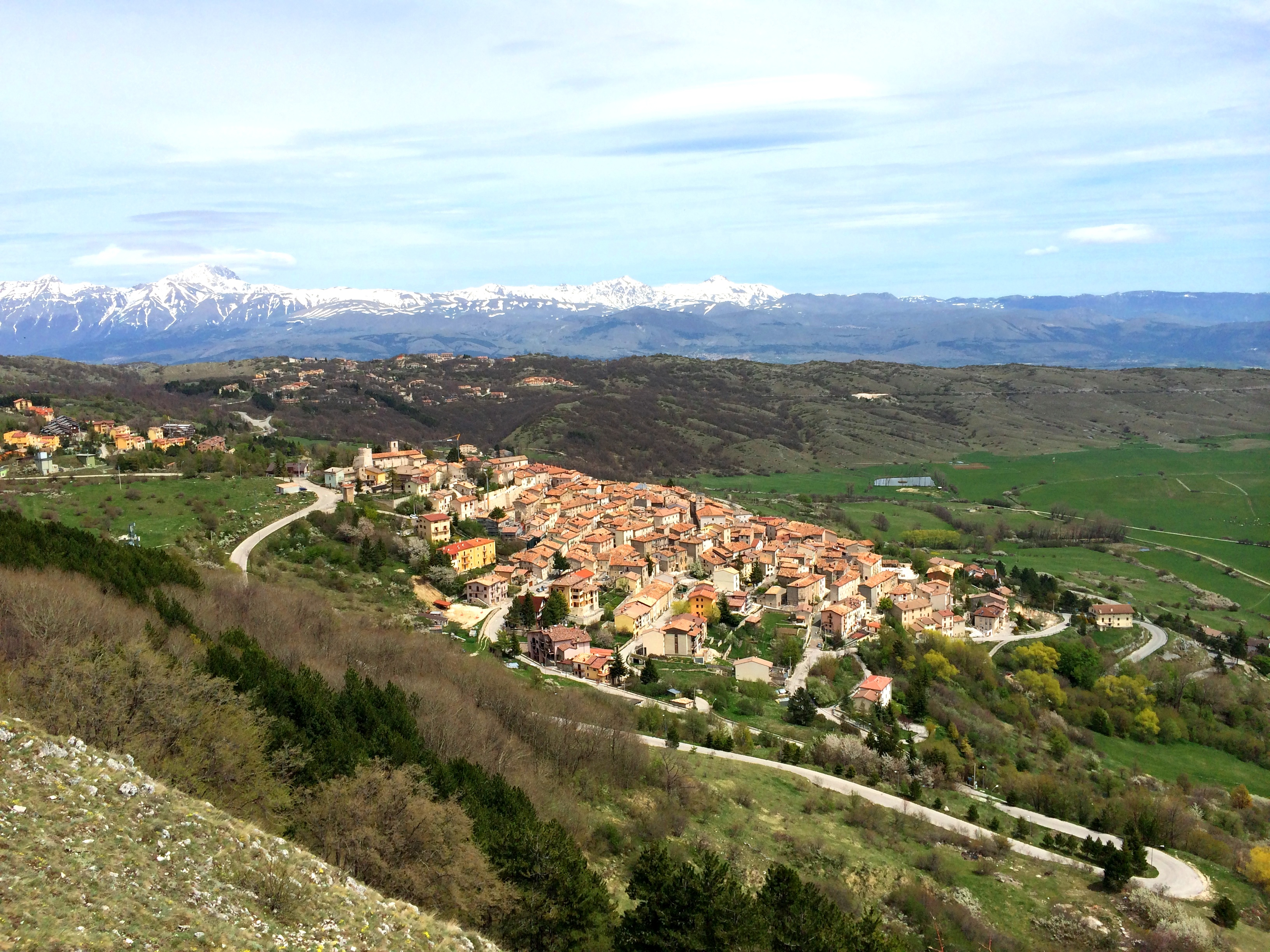

- Coat of arms

- Location within Italy Location within Abruzzo
- Coordinates: 42°14′14″N 13°29′24″E
- Country: Italy
- Region: Abruzzo
- Province: L'Aquila (AQ)

Government
  - Mayor: Gennarino Di Stefano

Area
  - Total: 27.59 km^{2} (10.65 sq mi)
- Elevation: 1,434 m (4,705 ft)

Population (31 December 2010)
  - Total: 538
  - Density: 19.5/km^{2} (50.5/sq mi)
- Demonym: Roccacagnesi
- Time zone: UTC+1 (CET)
  - Summer (DST): UTC+2 (CEST)
- Postal code: 67047
- Dialing code: 0862
- Patron saint: St. Lucy
- Saint day: 13 December
- Website: Official website

Rocca di Cambio (locally Rocche 'i Cagne) is a comune and town in the province of L'Aquila in the Abruzzo region of Italy.

Located in the northern part of the Altopiano delle Rocche, the communal territory is included in the Sirente-Velino Regional Park. Sights include the Abbey of Santa Lucia and the nearby Campo Felice ski resort.

Numerous buildings were damaged in the course of the 2009 L'Aquila earthquake, whose epicenter was located nearby, on the boundary with Lucoli.

== Twin towns ==
- Saas-Fee, Switzerland
