= Abbey of Santa Lucia =

Abbey in Rocca di Cambio, Italy

Coordinates: 42.242858°N 13.494181°E

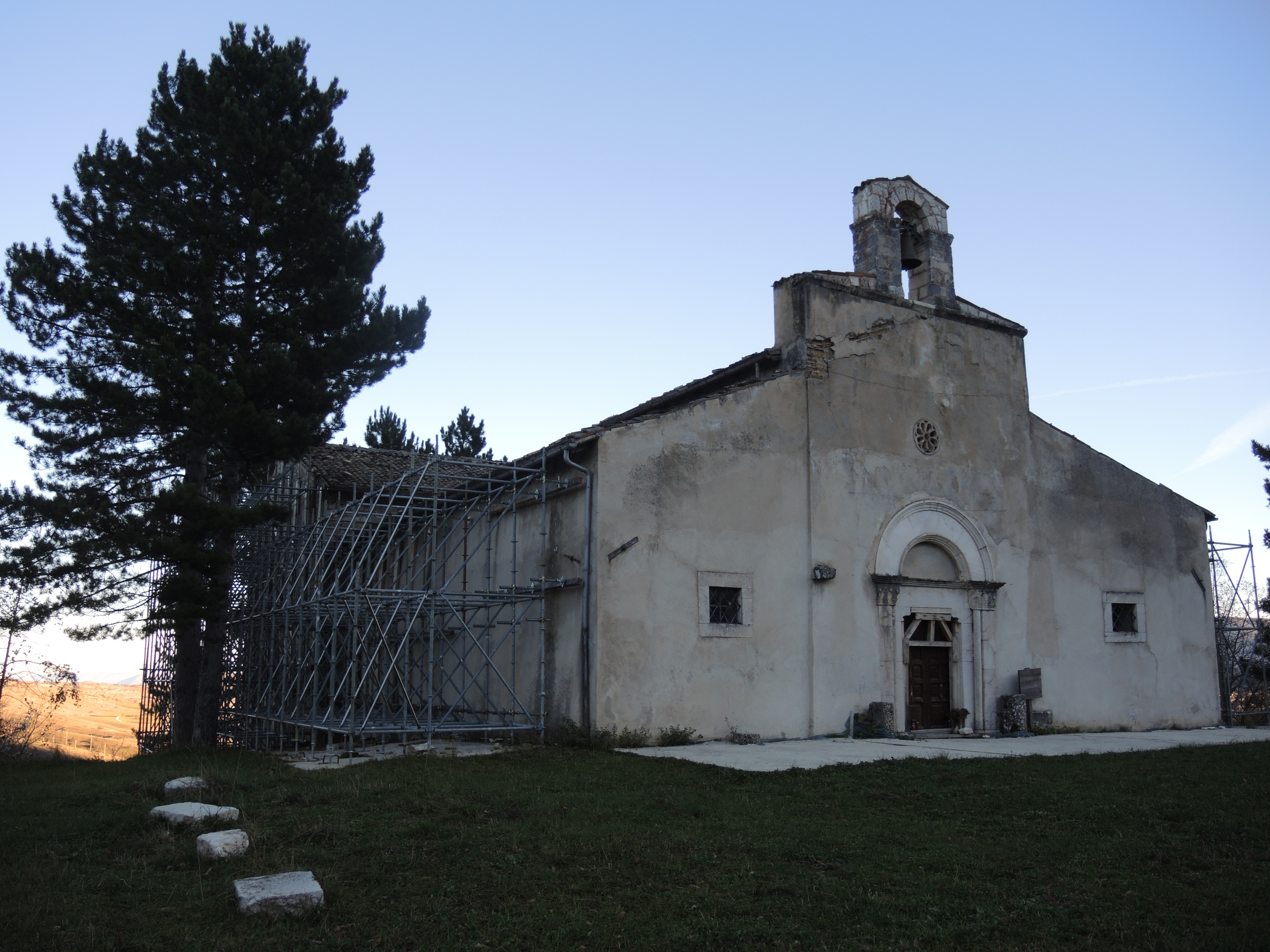
Abbey of Santa Lucia

The Abbey of Santa Lucia is an 11th-12th century, Romanesque and Gothic-style abbey in the comune of Rocca di Cambio, region of Abruzzo, central Italy.

== History ==
The abbey is mentioned for the first time in an inventory of the diocese of L'Aquila in 1313. However, it was likely built during the 11th-12th century, in a time where numerous monasteries were being built in Abruzzo. It was located in a plateau crossed by the Via Claudia Nova, between the ancient cities of Alba Fucens and Aveia, near the town of Fossa.

An earthquake in 1703 destroyed most of the monastic complex and the surrounding borough, and forced much of the inhabitants to move to what is now Rocca di Cambio and the localities of Terranera and Fonteavignone.

== Description ==
The sober façade of the church has a Romanesque portal from the 15th century and a small rose window.

The edifice is on the Latin cross plan, with a nave and two aisles of nearly the same length, ending in a large presbytery without an apse. In the right wall of the transept is a 15th-century ciborium, with columns and capitals in Gothic-Renaissance style, while the left wall houses a fresco of the Last Supper, episodes of Jesus' life, and the lives of Saints. They date from Among the various figures portrayed in them, one has been identified as the future pope Celestine V.

Other frescoes, dating to the 14th and the early 15th century, are housed in the crypt.

== Sources ==
- Santa Lucia: testimonianza d’arte e sacralità dal 1178 ai giorni nostri. Pro Loco di Rocca di Cambio.
