= Castello Orsini =

Coordinates: 42.0842°N 13.4125°E

Orsini Castle
- Castello Orsini
- Massa d'Albe
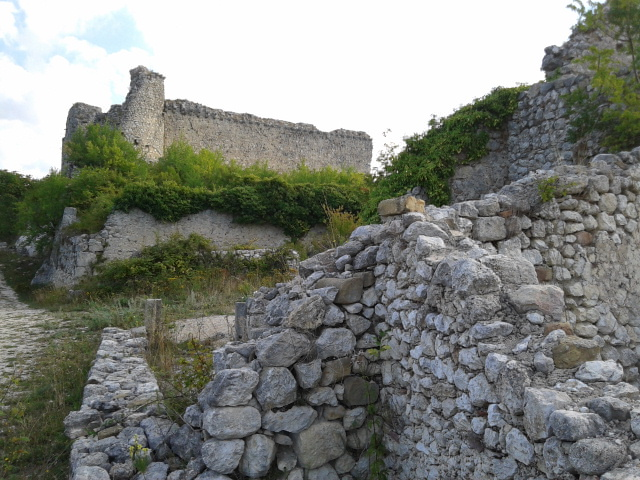
- Castle in Massa d'Albe

Site information
- Type: Castle

Location

Site history
- Built: 14th century

Castello Orsini (Italian for Orsini Castle) is a Middle Ages castle in Massa d'Albe, Province of L'Aquila (Abruzzo).

== History ==
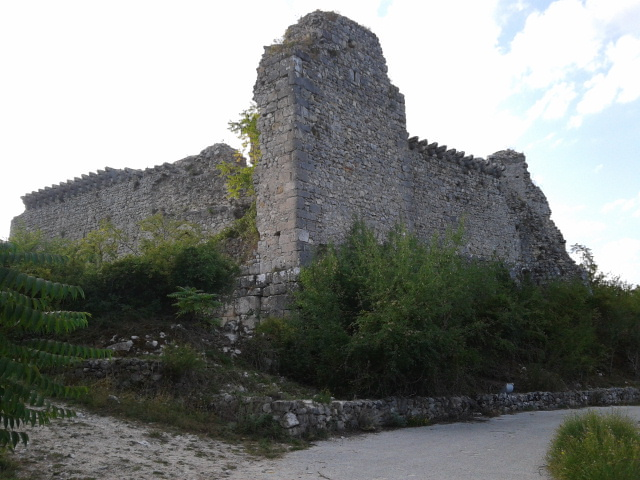
Remains of the castle's walls

The castle is located near the archaeological site marked by the remnants of the Equi settlement of Alba Fucens, a Roman colony built after the Second Samnite War in the 4th century BC, and the later medieval village of Albe, which was the capital of the Albense county and was almost completely destroyed by the 1915 Avezzano earthquake.

Strategically positioned to control the original route of the via Tiburtina Valeria, the castle was rebuilt by the lords of Albe, only to be destroyed in 1268 by Charles I of Anjou as retribution after his victory in the Battle of Tagliacozzo. It was finally rebuilt by the Orsini family starting in 1372.

During World War II, the castle housed the Nazi headquarters for the forces engaged between the Gustav Line and the Caesar Line.

== Architecture ==
The castle has a rectangular layout. Three sides of the fortification wall remain, except for the east side. Two circular towers with scarp walls are located at the northeast and southwest corners, while the northwest corner has the remnants of a square tower. The entrance portal is characterized by a pointed arch, suggesting that the fortress was built in the 14th century, although the addition of the outer scarp indicates a reconstruction dating to the 15th century.
