= Battle of Monte Grappa =

1918 WW1 battle

Coordinates: 45°51′N 11°44′E

Battles of Monte Grappa (1917–1918)
- Part of the Italian Front of the First World War
- Italian soldiers on Monte Grappa in 1918
Date	End of 1917 (1st battle), June 1918 (2nd battle) and October 1918 (3rd battle)
Location	Monte Grappa, Italy
Result	Italian victory

Belligerents
Austria-Hungary; Germany (1st battle)	Italy; Romanian Legion

Commanders and leaders
Archduke Eugen of Austria (1st); Arz von Straußenburg (2nd and 3rd)	Armando Diaz

Strength
143,000	134,000

Casualties and losses
21,000 during the first battle, 34,000 during the third battle	12,000 during the first battle, 17,000 during the third battle

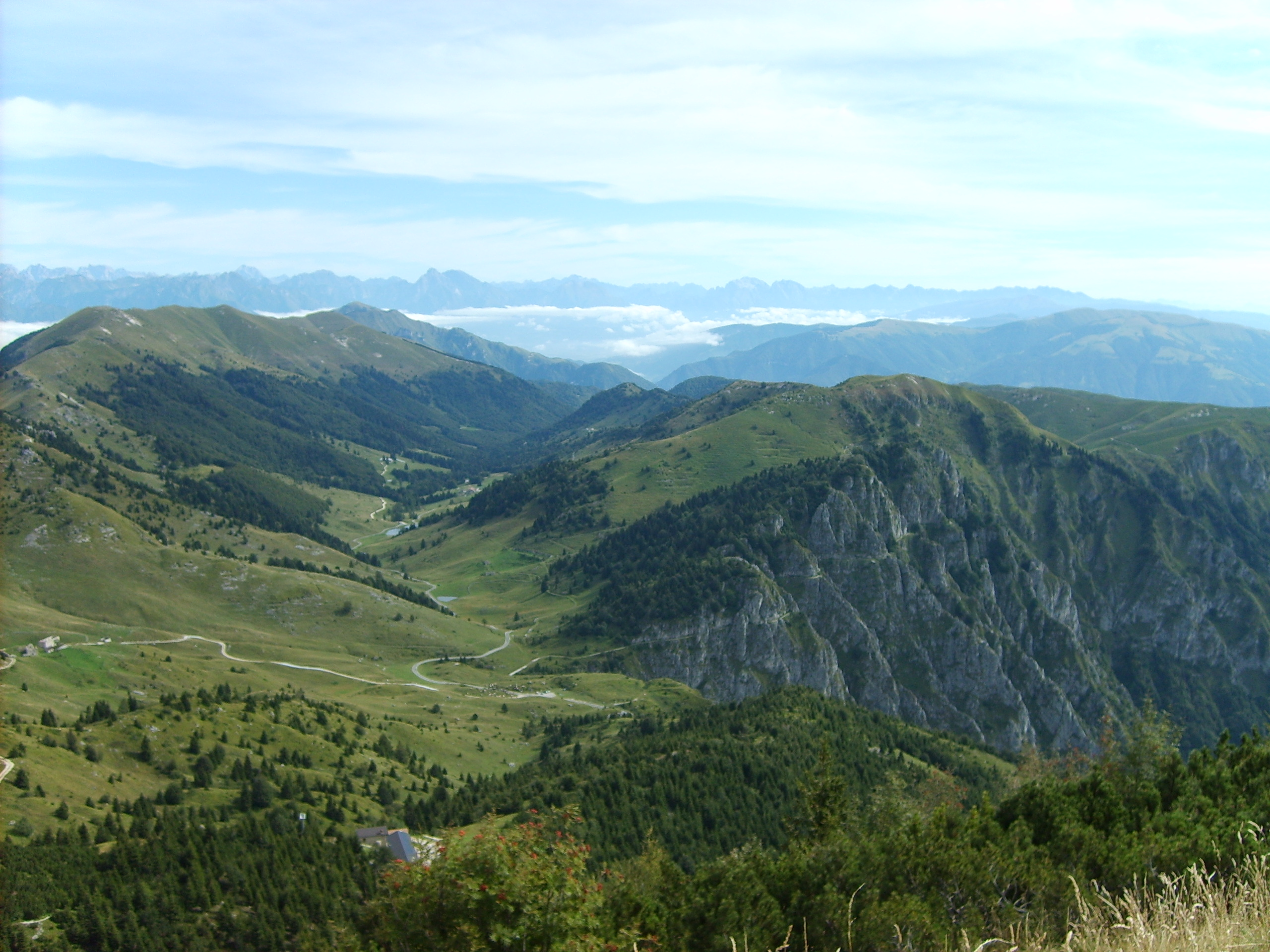
View from the summit towards the Austrian positions

The Battles of Monte Grappa were a series of three battles which were fought during World War I between the armies of the Austro-Hungarian Empire and the Kingdom of Italy for control of the Monte Grappa massif, as it covered the left flank of the Italian Piave front.

== History ==
The first of these battles became the most famous as it brought the Austrian advance to a halt following the Austro-Hungarian autumn offensive of 1917. The Italian Chief of the general staff general Luigi Cadorna had ordered to construct fortified defenses on the Monte Grappa summit to make the mountain an impregnable fortress. When the Austro-Hungarian autumn offensive of 1917 routed the Italians, the Austrians, with help from the German Army's Alpenkorps failed to take the mountain's summit during the first battle of Monte Grappa from 11 November 1917 to 23 December 1917. Thus, the Italian front along the Piave river was stabilized and, although the Austrians could see Venice from their positions, they would never reach it. Italian casualties totaled 12,000 and Austrian casualties 21,000.

The second battle of Monte Grappa was complementary to the wider Austrian summer offensive of 1918, which was the last offensive operation of the Austro–Hungarian Army in World War I.

The third battle of Monte Grappa started on 24 October 1918, as part of the final Italian offensive of the war, when 9 Italian divisions attacked the Austrian positions on Monte Grappa. The Austrians answered by increasing their forces on the mountain from 9 to 15 divisions and thus committing all remaining reserves. But the worn down Austrian Army began a general retreat on 28 October, when Czechoslovakia declared independence from Austria-Hungary. On 3 November, the Armistice of Villa Giusti officially ceased hostilities on the Italian front.

== In popular culture ==
Monte Grappa appears in Electronic Arts' 2016 first-person shooter video game Battlefield 1 as a multiplayer map. The map is set during the final Italian offensive in the Third Battle of Monte Grappa pitting Austro-Hungarian forces against the Kingdom of Italy. The map is part of the "Iron Walls" operation set during the 1918 Italian offensive. In Single Player, you play as an Arditi named Luca Vincenzo Cocchiola. In Multiplayer, you play either as a regular Italian Army soldier or an Austro-Hungarian, depending on who you choose to side. The map also appears in the game as part of the singleplayer campaign under the name Avanti Savoia

It has also appeared in 2022 Multiplayer video game Isonzo as a playable map.

== See also ==
- Monte Grappa
