= Joseph Mertens =

Belgian archaeologist

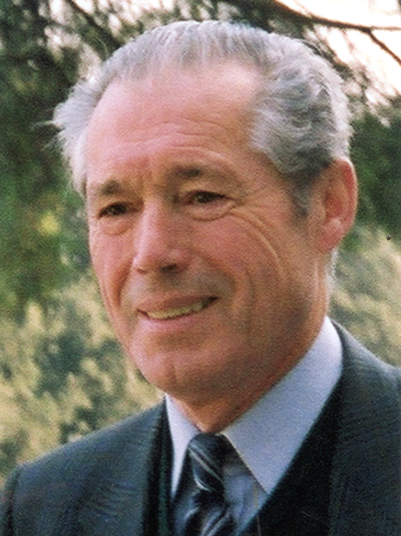
Photo of Jozef Mertens

Joseph Mertens (17 January 1921 at Tienen – 1 July 2007 at Wezembeek, Belgium) was an accomplished 20th-century Belgian archaeologist, known for his excavations of Alba Fucens and Herdonia.

== Sources ==
- Article by Giuliano Volpe posted on http://www.archaeogate.org/classica/article/629/1/in-ricordo-del-prof-mertens.html, July 2007
- Archivio Mertens (Alba Fucens)
- J.-C. Balty. et al. 2012. Belgica et Italica: Joseph Mertens: une vie pour l'archéologie: Alba in excelso locata saxo ... : Obscura incultis Herdonia ab agris: Atti del Convegno in memoria di Joseph Mertens, Academia Belgica, 4-6 dicembre 2008. Bruxelles: Belgisch Historisch Instituut te Rome.
