= Romanian Legion of Italy =

Military body in World War I

- Legione Romena d'Italia
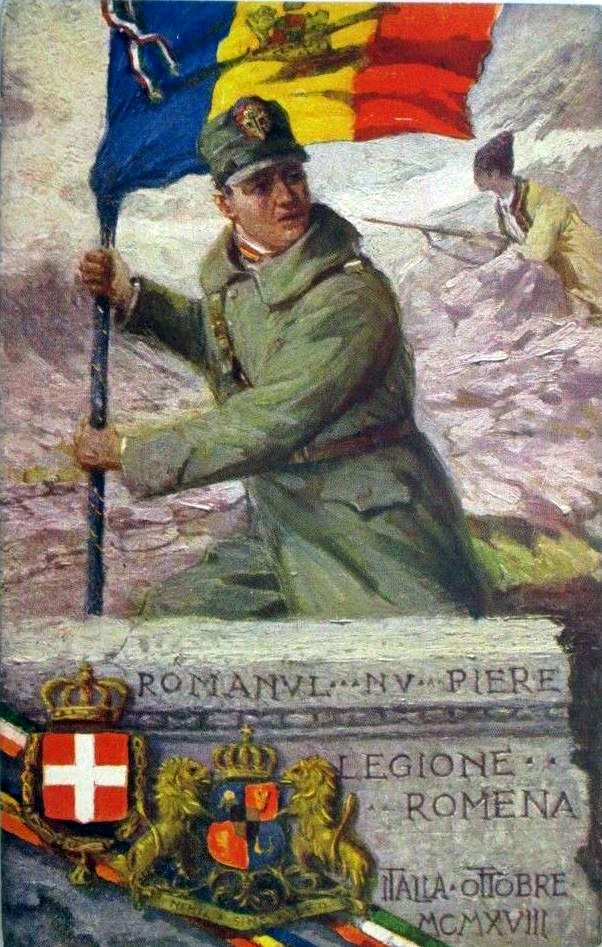
- Artistic raffiguration
- Active: June 1918 to August 31, 1919
- Country: Romania
- Allegiance: Italy
- Branch: Royal Italian Army
- Size: 843
- Garrison/HQ: Avezzano
- Engagements: 2nd Battle of Monte Grappa; Battle of Vittorio Veneto

Commanders
- Notable commanders: Gen. Luciano Ferigo; Col. Camillo Ferraioli

The Romanian Legion of Italy was a military body made up of Romanian soldiers in Italy, formed in June 1918, towards the end of World War I.

== History ==
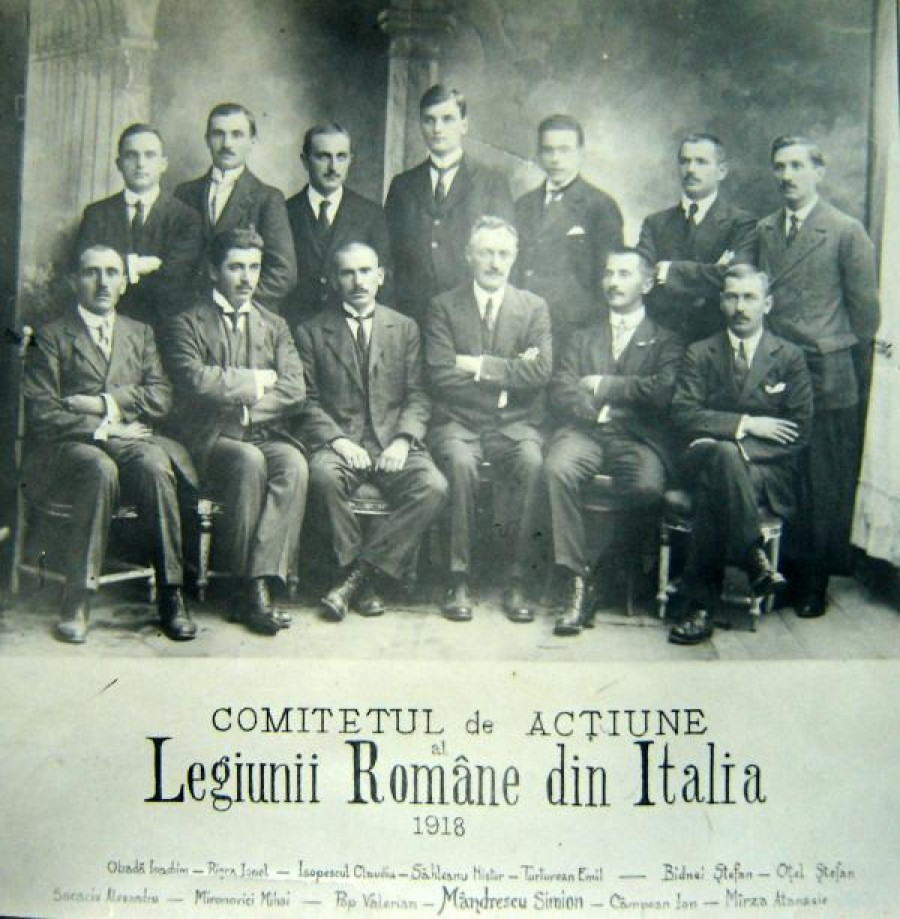
Representatives of the Legion

In 1916 the Romanian prisoners present in Italy were divided as it follows: 3,600 in the prison camp of Mantua, 2,000 in Cavarzere, 800 in Ostiglia and 800 in Chiaravalle, zones sufficiently distant from the areas of military operations. These came from Transylvania, Banat and Bucovina.

During the "Congress of Oppressed Nationalities of the Austro-Hungarian Empire", held in the Capitol hall in Rome between 27 March and 10 April 1918, some Romanian delegates managed to obtain the possibility of forming autonomous armed units from the Italian ones. On June 6, 1918, the "Romanian Legion of Italy" was formed with headquarters at Avezzano concentration camp.

The Legion fought in the "Second battle of the Grappa" on 24 October 1918 and in the Vittorio Veneto offensive. It consisted of 830 soldiers and 13 officers.

It ended its function on August 31, 1919.

== Order of battle ==
- Company I (250 soldiers) - framed in the 52nd Italian Alpine Division (VIII Army); battles of Montello and Vittorio Veneto;
- Company II - framed in the VIII Army; battles of Sisemol, Val Vella and Cimone;
- Company III - framed in the IV Army; 2nd Battle of Monte Grappa.

== See also ==
- Avezzano concentration camp
- Czechoslovak Legion
- Polish Legions in World War I
- Romanian Volunteer Corps in Russia

== Bibliography ==
- Cappellano, Filippo; Bertè, Tiziano (2009). La legione romena (1918-1919).
- Cappellano, Filippo; Formiconi, Paolo (2018). Le relazioni militari italo-romene nella Grande Guerra: esportazioni di materiale bellico e legione romena. Rovereto: Museo storico italiano della guerra.
