= Terranera =

Coordinates: 42°14′05″N 13°32′04″E

- Frazione
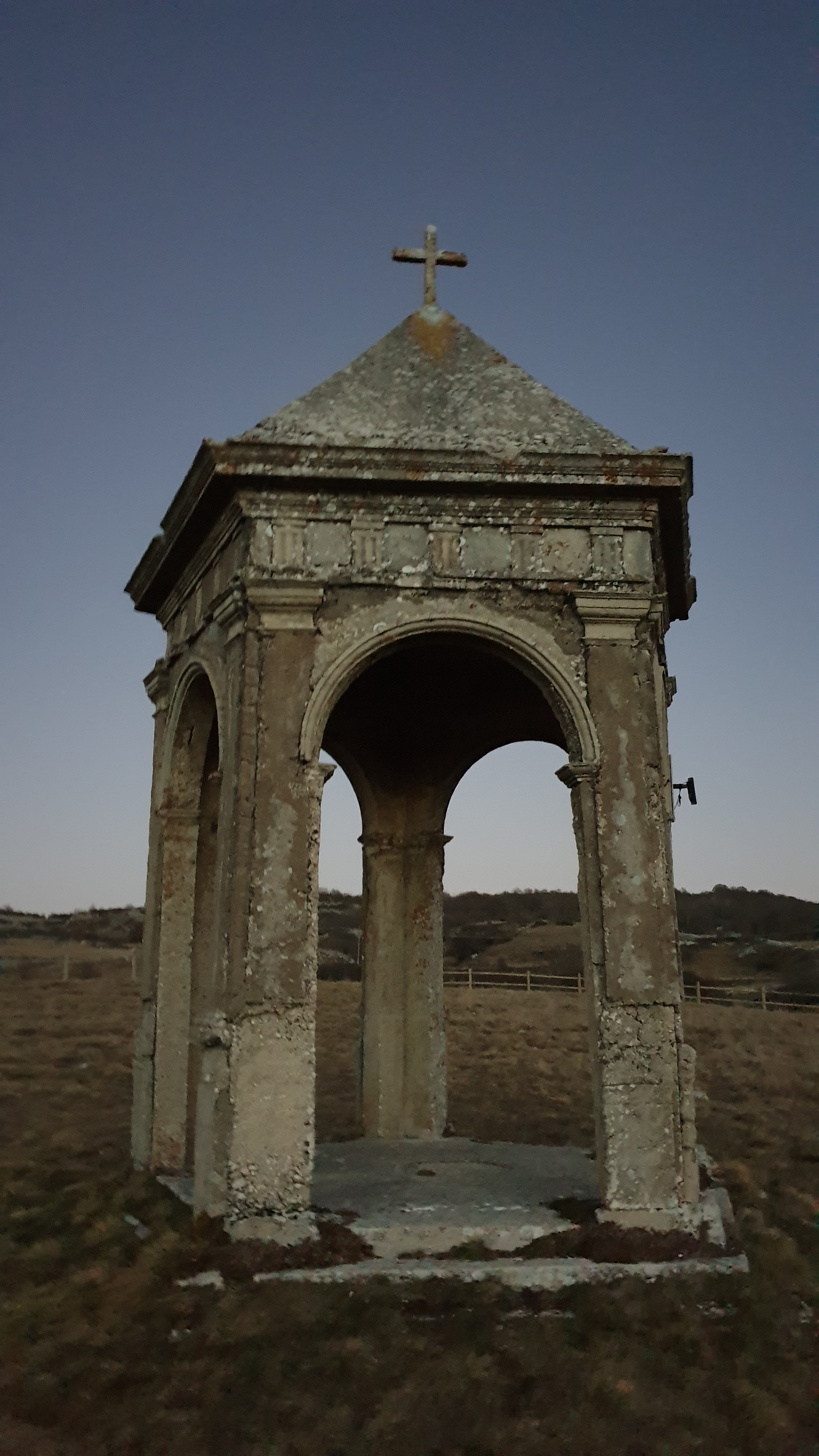
- Interactive map of Terranera
- Country: Italy
- Region: Abruzzo
- Province: L'Aquila
- Commune: Rocca di Mezzo
- Time zone: UTC+1 (CET)
  - Summer (DST): UTC+2 (CEST)

Terranera is a frazione of Rocca di Mezzo, in the Province of L'Aquila in the Abruzzo, region of Italy.
