= Rocca di Mezzo =

- Comune
- Comune di Rocca di Mezzo
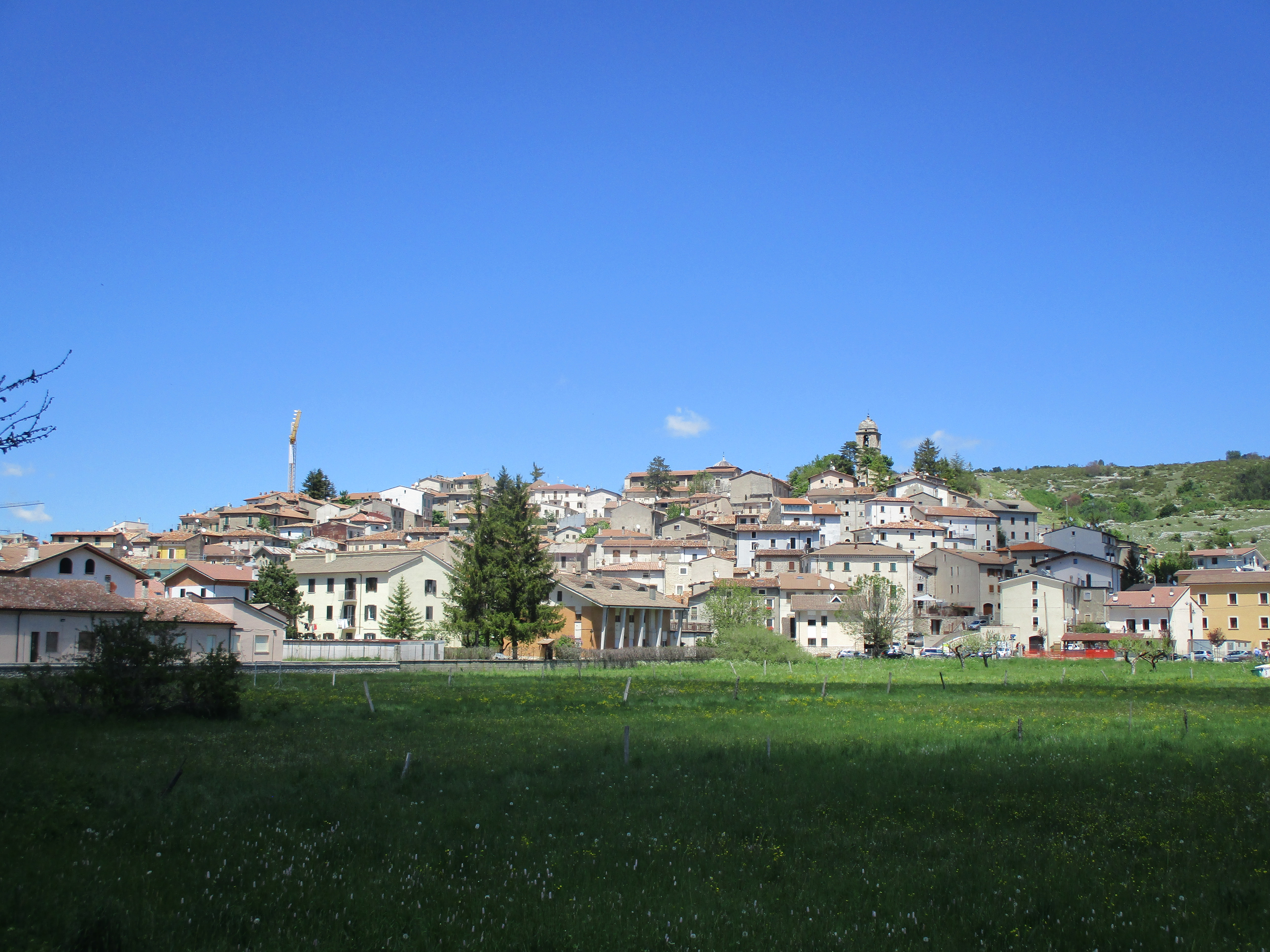

- Coat of arms

- Location within Italy Location within Abruzzo
- Coordinates: 42°12′21″N 13°31′13″E
- Country: Italy
- Region: Abruzzo
- Province: L'Aquila (AQ)
- Frazioni: Fonteavignone, Rovere, Terranera

Government
  - Mayor: Mauro Di Ciccio

Area
  - Total: 86.95 km^{2} (33.57 sq mi)
- Elevation: 1,329 m (4,360 ft)

Population (31 December 2010)
  - Total: 1,556
  - Density: 17.90/km^{2} (46.35/sq mi)
- Demonym: Rocchigiani
- Time zone: UTC+1 (CET)
  - Summer (DST): UTC+2 (CEST)
- Postal code: 67048
- Dialing code: 0862
- Patron saint: St. Leucius
- Saint day: 11 January

Rocca di Mezzo (locally La Rocca) is a comune and town in the Province of L'Aquila, in the Abruzzo region of central Italy.

It is home to the seat of the Sirente-Velino Regional Park.

== Climate ==
Climate data for Rocca di Mezzo, elevation 1,329 m (4,360 ft), (1951–2000)
Month	Jan	Feb	Mar	Apr	May	Jun	Jul	Aug	Sep	Oct	Nov	Dec	Year
Record high °C (°F)	17.2 (63.0)	18.2 (64.8)	20.6 (69.1)	23.0 (73.4)	27.6 (81.7)	31.0 (87.8)	33.4 (92.1)	39.8 (103.6)	30.8 (87.4)	27.8 (82.0)	23.7 (74.7)	18.4 (65.1)	39.8 (103.6)
Mean daily maximum °C (°F)	4.5 (40.1)	5.2 (41.4)	8.1 (46.6)	11.1 (52.0)	16.1 (61.0)	20.0 (68.0)	23.3 (73.9)	23.4 (74.1)	19.4 (66.9)	14.3 (57.7)	9.2 (48.6)	5.4 (41.7)	13.3 (56.0)
Daily mean °C (°F)	−0.2 (31.6)	0.4 (32.7)	3.1 (37.6)	6.1 (43.0)	10.5 (50.9)	14.0 (57.2)	16.6 (61.9)	16.6 (61.9)	13.3 (55.9)	8.9 (48.0)	4.7 (40.5)	1.1 (34.0)	7.9 (46.3)
Mean daily minimum °C (°F)	−4.9 (23.2)	−4.4 (24.1)	−1.8 (28.8)	1.1 (34.0)	4.8 (40.6)	7.9 (46.2)	9.8 (49.6)	9.7 (49.5)	7.2 (45.0)	3.6 (38.5)	0.1 (32.2)	−3.3 (26.1)	2.5 (36.5)
Record low °C (°F)	−24.0 (−11.2)	−24.8 (−12.6)	−22.4 (−8.3)	−16.0 (3.2)	−10.0 (14.0)	−2.0 (28.4)	0.0 (32.0)	−0.2 (31.6)	−3.0 (26.6)	−10.0 (14.0)	−15.0 (5.0)	−20.4 (−4.7)	−24.8 (−12.6)
Average precipitation mm (inches)	87.3 (3.44)	84.2 (3.31)	78.8 (3.10)	85.2 (3.35)	71.1 (2.80)	57.7 (2.27)	37.6 (1.48)	42.0 (1.65)	67.5 (2.66)	102.8 (4.05)	149.4 (5.88)	131.3 (5.17)	994.9 (39.16)
Average precipitation days	9.2	8.6	9.4	11.2	9.5	7.5	5.1	5.5	6.6	9.3	11.3	10.9	104.1
Source: Regione Abruzzo
