= Alba Fucens =

Ancient Italic town

Coordinates: 42°04′47.62″N 13°24′32.34″E

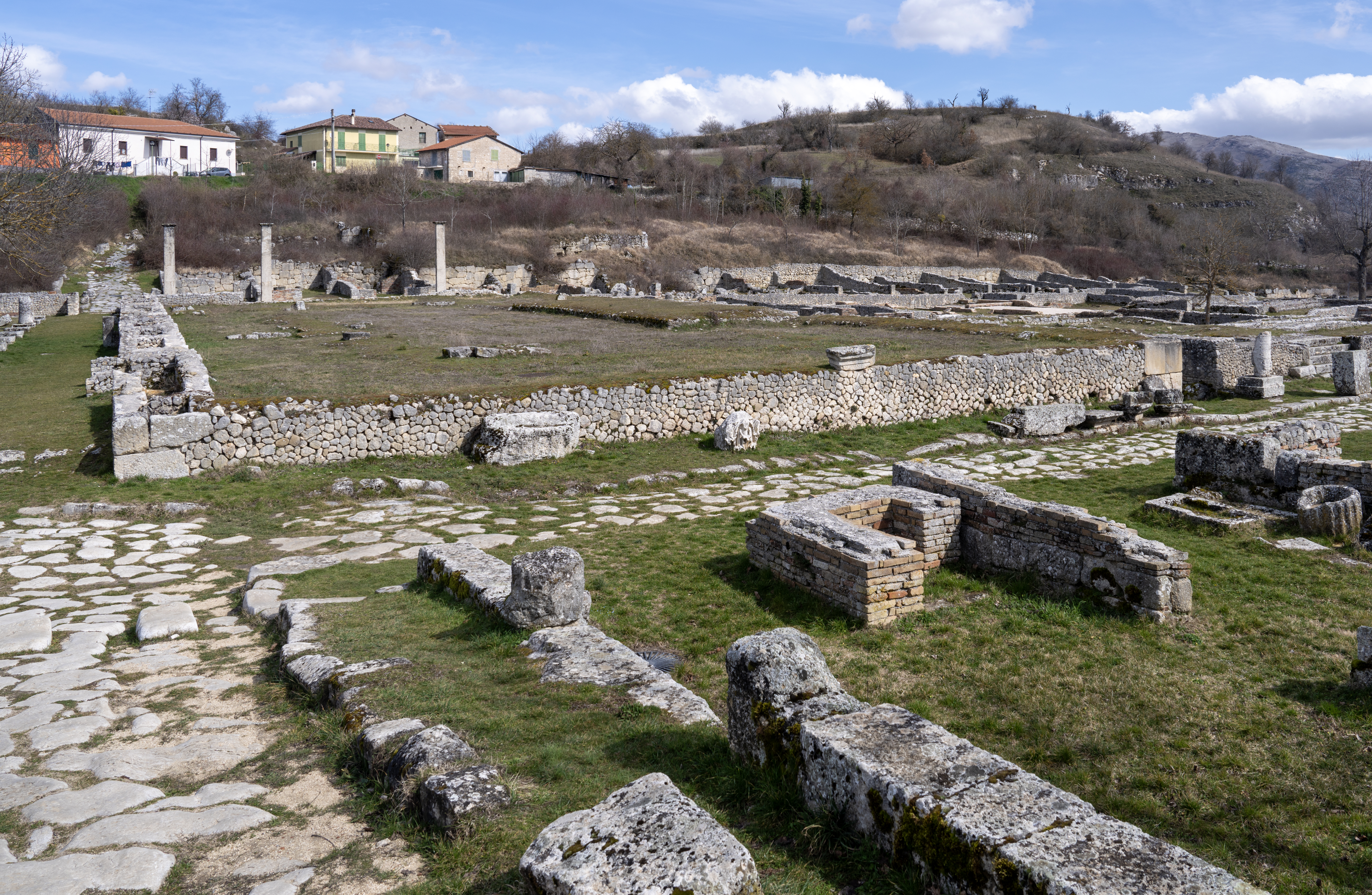

- Location within Abruzzo
- Periods: Roman Republic - Byzantine Empire
- Location: Massa d'Albe, Province of L'Aquila

Site notes
- Website: Official website

Alba Fucens was an ancient Italic town located at 1,000 m (3,300 ft) elevation at the base of Monte Velino, approximately 6.5 km (4.0 mi) north of Avezzano, Abruzzo, central Italy. Its ruins can be found in the comune of Massa d'Albe.

The city is largely visible after excavation and is probably the most important ancient site in Abruzzo.

== History ==
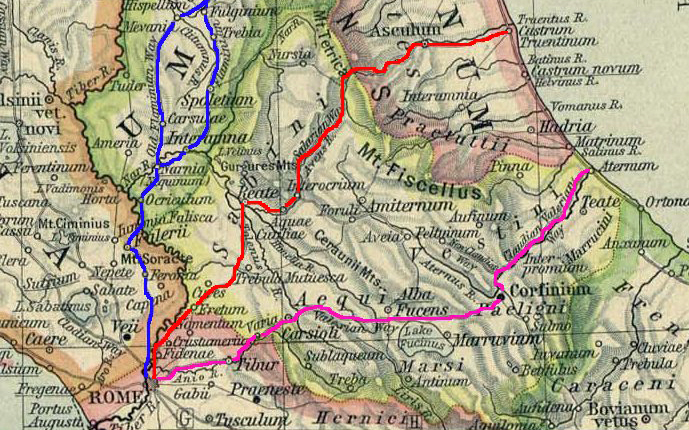
Via Tiburtina/Valeria in pink

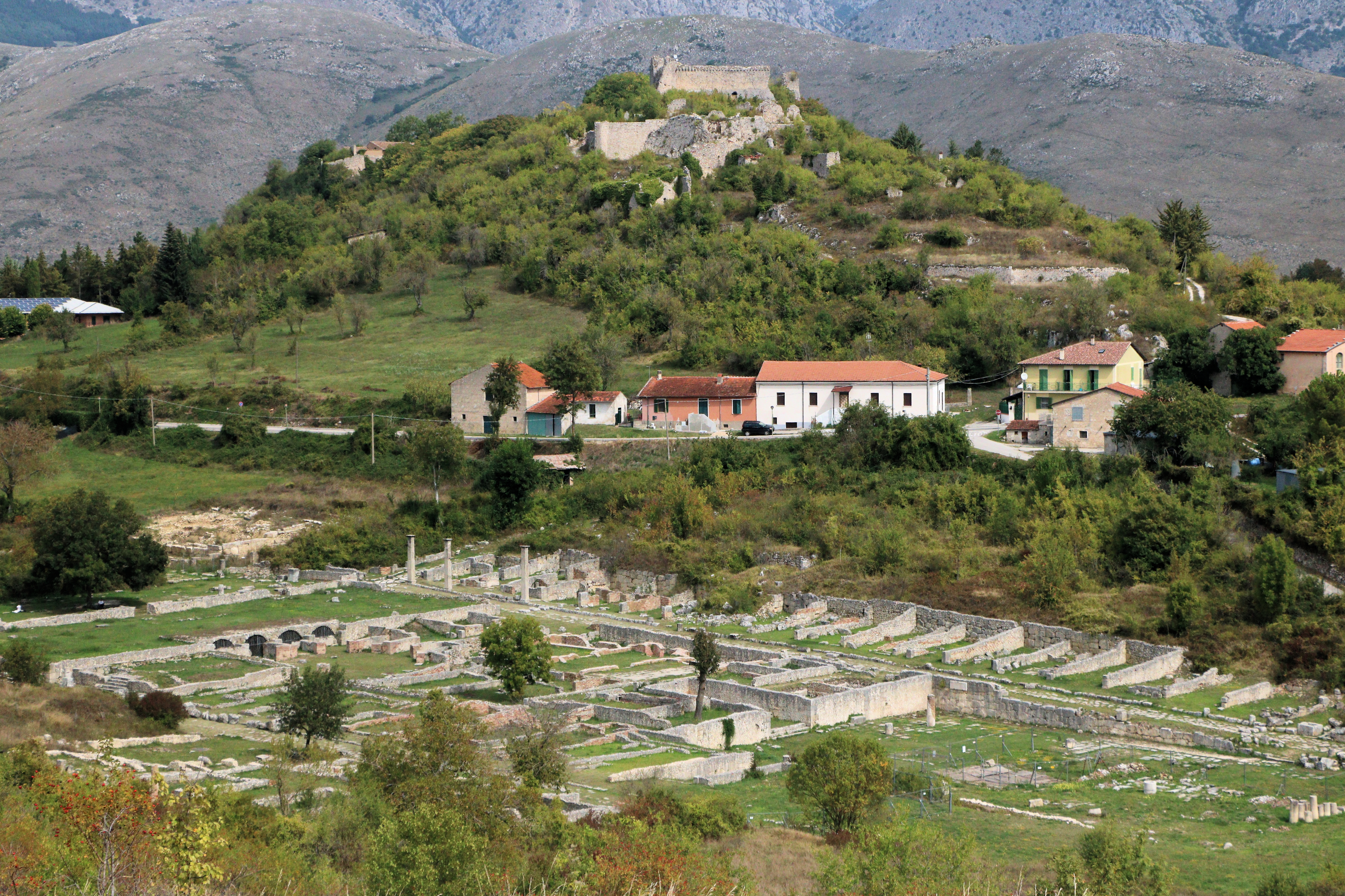
City

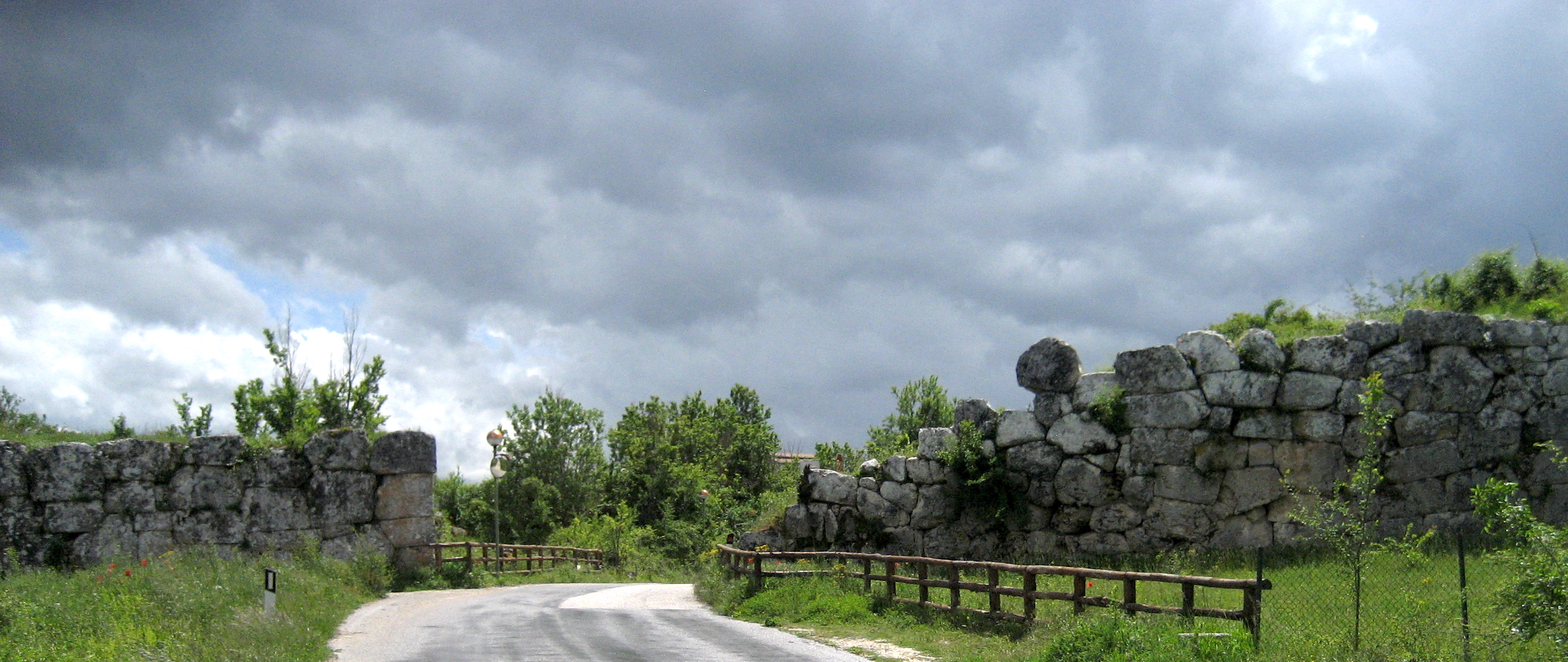
City walls

It was originally a town of the Aequi, though on the frontier of the Marsi, but was occupied by a Latin colony in the late fourth century BC.

Following the defeat of the Aequi in the closing phase of the Second Samnite Wars.With the intention of securing control of the Apennine corridor and facilitating Roman access toward the Adriatic while tightening their grip on Samnium, the Romans initially offered the Aequi civitas sine suffragio, a form of citizenship without voting rights. Following the Aequian rejection of this settlement, Rome conquered the Aequi and subsequently established two Latin colonies (Alba Fucens in 303 BC and Carsioli shortly thereafter between 302 and 298 BC).

The initial colonial body, consisting of approximately 6,000 settlers, built a wall in the years immediately following their settlement. The colonial foundation was met with hostility by the surrounding Aequian population. In the year following its establishment, the Aequi launched an unsuccessful assault on the colony, apparently unwilling to accept the implantation of a fortified Latin citadel within their former lands.

Alba Fucens lay on a hill just to the north of the Via Valeria, which was prolonged beyond Tibur probably at this very period. In the Second Punic War Alba at first remained faithful and in 211 BC sent a contingent of 2,000 men to help Rome, but afterwards refused to send contingents and was punished.

After this it became a regular place of detention for important state prisoners such as Syphax of Numidia, Perseus of Macedonia, and Bituitus, king of the Arverni.

It was attacked by the allies in the Social War, but remained faithful to Rome; and its strong position rendered it a place of some importance in the civil wars. In the struggle between Sulla and Marius, the city sided with the latter and at the end of the conflict Sulla, to punish it and at the same time satisfy the requests of one of his lieutenants, Metellus Pius, distributed part of the territory of Alba Fucens to the latter's veterans.

In the conflict between Caesar and Pompey, it hosted a garrison of six cohorts of Lucius Domitius Ahenobarbus (consul 54 BC) then surrendered to the legions of Caesar.

In 44 BC, the legion Martia (enrolled from the Marsi) mutinied against the consul Mark Antony and went over to the side of Octavian. The Martia, leaving the coast road at Aternum, took the Via Valeria and went to Alba Fucens, which due to its strategic position made it possible to maintain contact with Octavian and, if necessary, prevent Antony from passing through towards the Adriatic.

Cicero said of the incident:

Now this legion [the Martia] is quartered in Alba Fucens. What other city could one choose, well fortified and nearby, or more suitable for its natural position for military operations, or more faithful, or inhabited by braver or more attached citizens to our Republic?

Its prosperity, in the imperial period, is testified by the inscriptions found. One of particular importance relates to the fate of the nearby Fucino river which dried up following the building of the Tunnels of Claudius to drain the lake in the 1st century by the emperor Claudius.

The ancient city was gradually abandoned in late antiquity, especially after a serious earthquake in the first half of the sixth century. In 537 it was occupied by the Byzantines during the Gothic war, its last mention in history by Procopius of Caesarea. The Lombards domination of the Fucino area in the seventh century favored the development of the medieval village of Albe (Massa d'Albe) on the dominant hill of San Nicola at an altitude of more than 1,000 m.

Alba Fucens was completely destroyed by the Saracens in the 10th century.

== Buildings ==
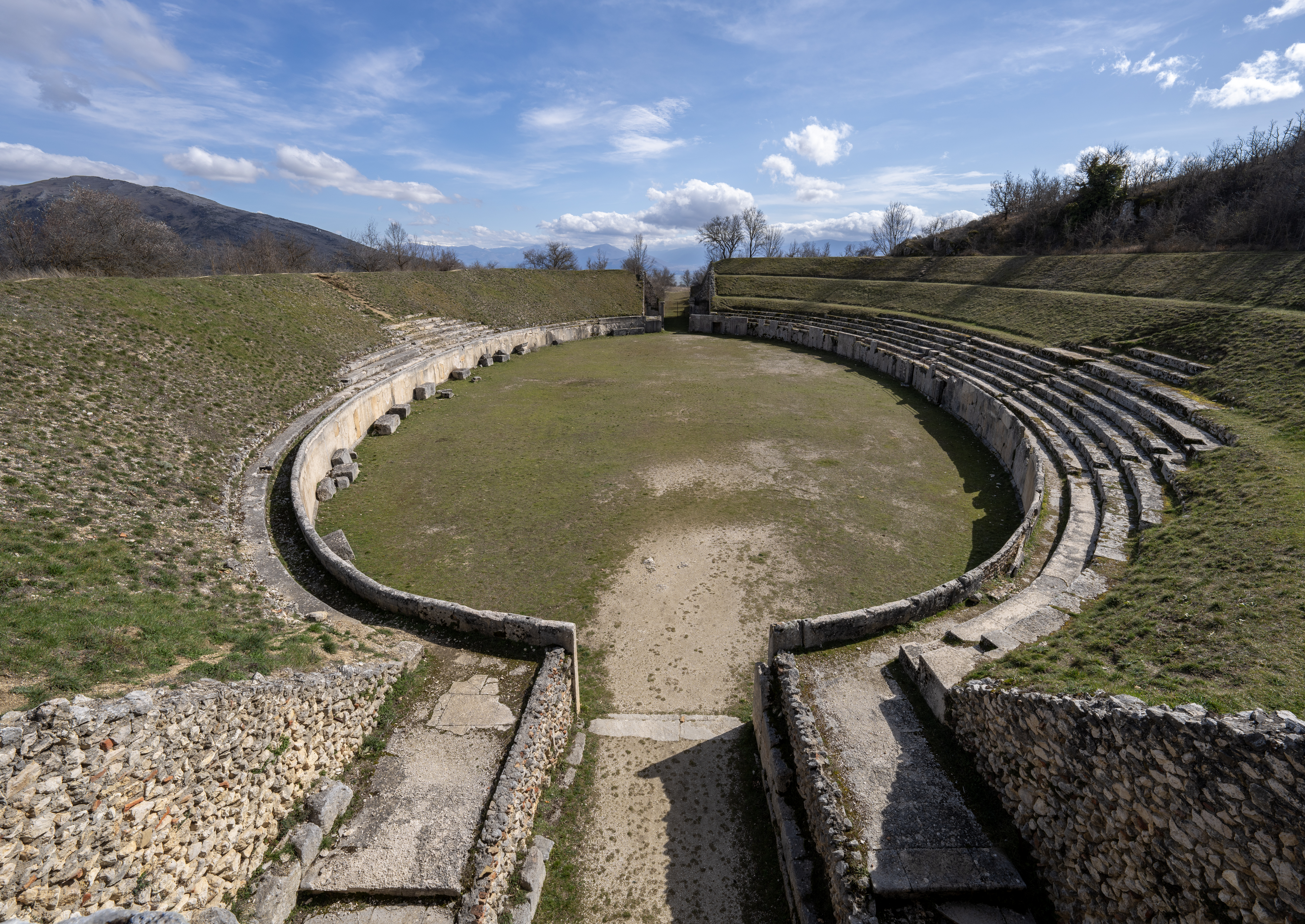
Amphitheatre

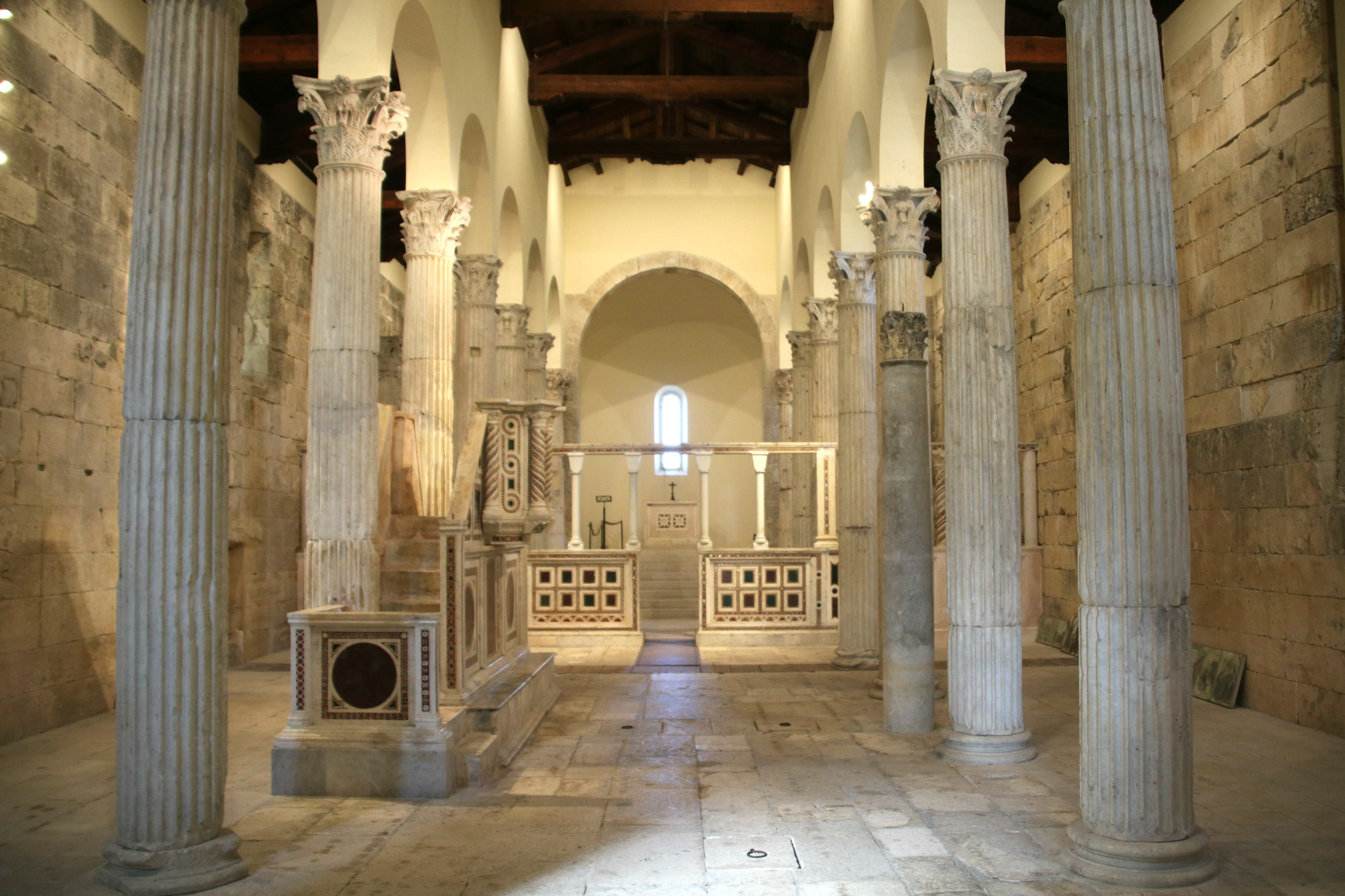
Temple of Apollo in the church of San Pietro

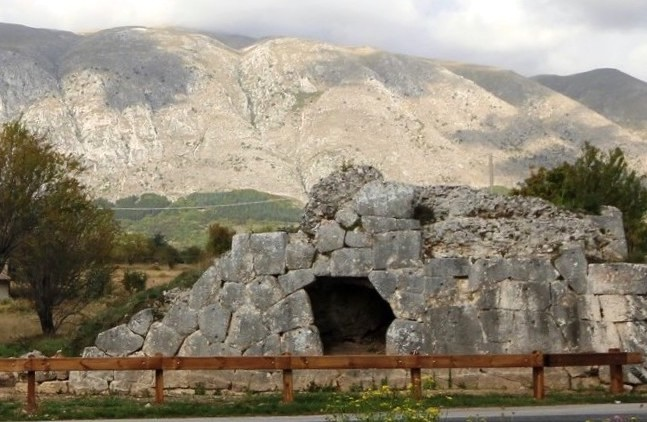
Aqueduct siphon bridge

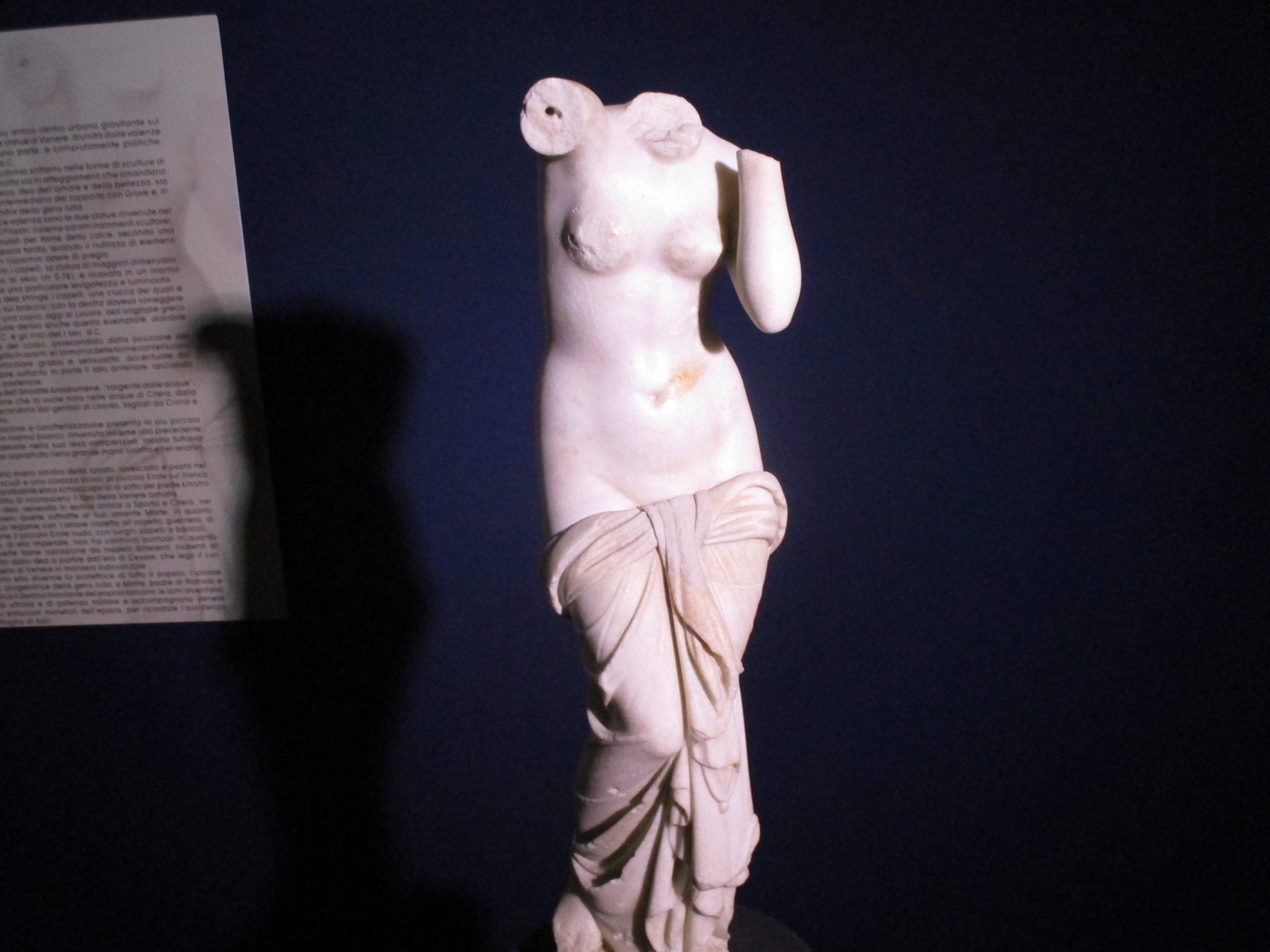
Venus of Alba Fucens

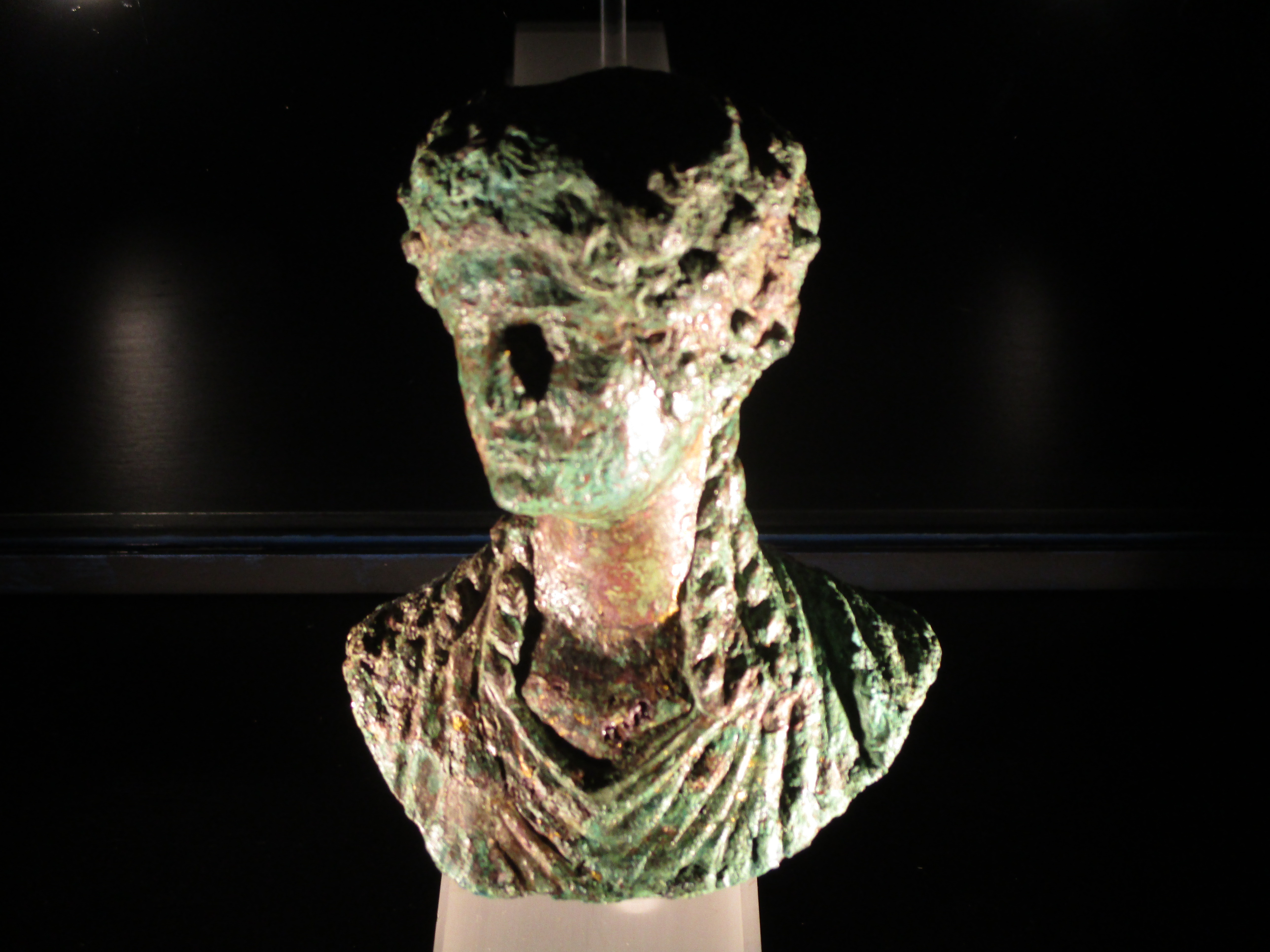
Agrippina Minor in bronze-guilt

The city streets and many buildings built on a Hippodamian orthogonal plan are clearly exposed. On the northern side is a large terrace surrounded by a portico attached to an exedra.

The city walls of about 3 km circumference are well preserved and constructed of polygonal masonry of uncertain date; the blocks are carefully jointed, and the faces smoothed. The arrangement of the gates is clearly traceable; as a rule they come at the end of a long, straight stretch of wall, and are placed so as to leave the right side of any attacking force exposed. On the north is, for a length of about 150 m, a triple line of defences of later date (possibly added by the Roman colonists), as both the city wall proper, and the double wall thrown out in front of it are partly constructed of concrete, and faced with finer polygonal masonry.

The forum (142 x 44 m) was overlooked by the basilica built (end of the 2nd century BC to first decades of the following century), the macellum (market) from the same era and the baths of the late Republican age, but enlarged in the imperial era. The baths were decorated with precious mosaics depicting marine scenes and subjects.

The well-preserved amphitheatre (96 x 79 m) from the reign of Tiberius was built by the Prefect of the Praetorium Nevius Sutorius Macro, born in Alba. There are numerous houses belonging to the local patricians including a domus. On the side of the Pettorino hill are the remains of the Roman theatre's cavea.

Remains of the 10 km long Roman aqueduct, built as early as the 1st century BC, are visible especially of the siphon-bridge in the locality of Arci, 1.5 km NE of the town. Its source was the Sant'Eugenia spring beyond the pass of Fonte Capo la Maina near the hamlet of Santa Jona. The last 3 km was unusually built using a pressured pipeline as an inverted siphon across a valley. At Arci is the venter of the inverted siphon, an embankment 12 m wide and over 130 m long increasing in height with the valley depth and at the deepest point was a bridge with arches carrying the pipes to reduce the depth of the siphon and hence the water pressure and associated leakage.

In the urban centre were the temple of Isis and the sanctuary of Hercules. The hill at the western end of the town was occupied by the Temple of Apollo of the Tuscan order from the 2nd c. BC, the remarkable remains of which are incorporated in a beautiful Romanesque church of San Pietro which contains some Cosmatesque mosaics. It is the only monastic church in Abruzzo in which the central nave is separated from the lateral ones by ancient columns.

The collegiate church of S. Nicola contains a remarkable staurotheca of the 11th century, and a wooden triptych in imitation of the Byzantine style with enamels, of the 13th century.

== Excavations ==
Discovered in 1949 after excavations carried out by the Belgian University of Louvain, the project led to a series of publications of the site.

The statue of Venus and other finds are at the National Museum of the Abruzzi at Chieti.

Since 2007 new excavations have been led by Brussels University, and amongst the most spectacular finds were a painted calendar and fasti.

== People ==
- Naevius Sutorius Macro

== Bibliography ==
- J. Mertens. 1969. Alba Fucens 2 Rapports et études. Bruxelles: Rome Institut Historique Belge.
