= Ovindoli =

- Comune
- Comune di Ovindoli
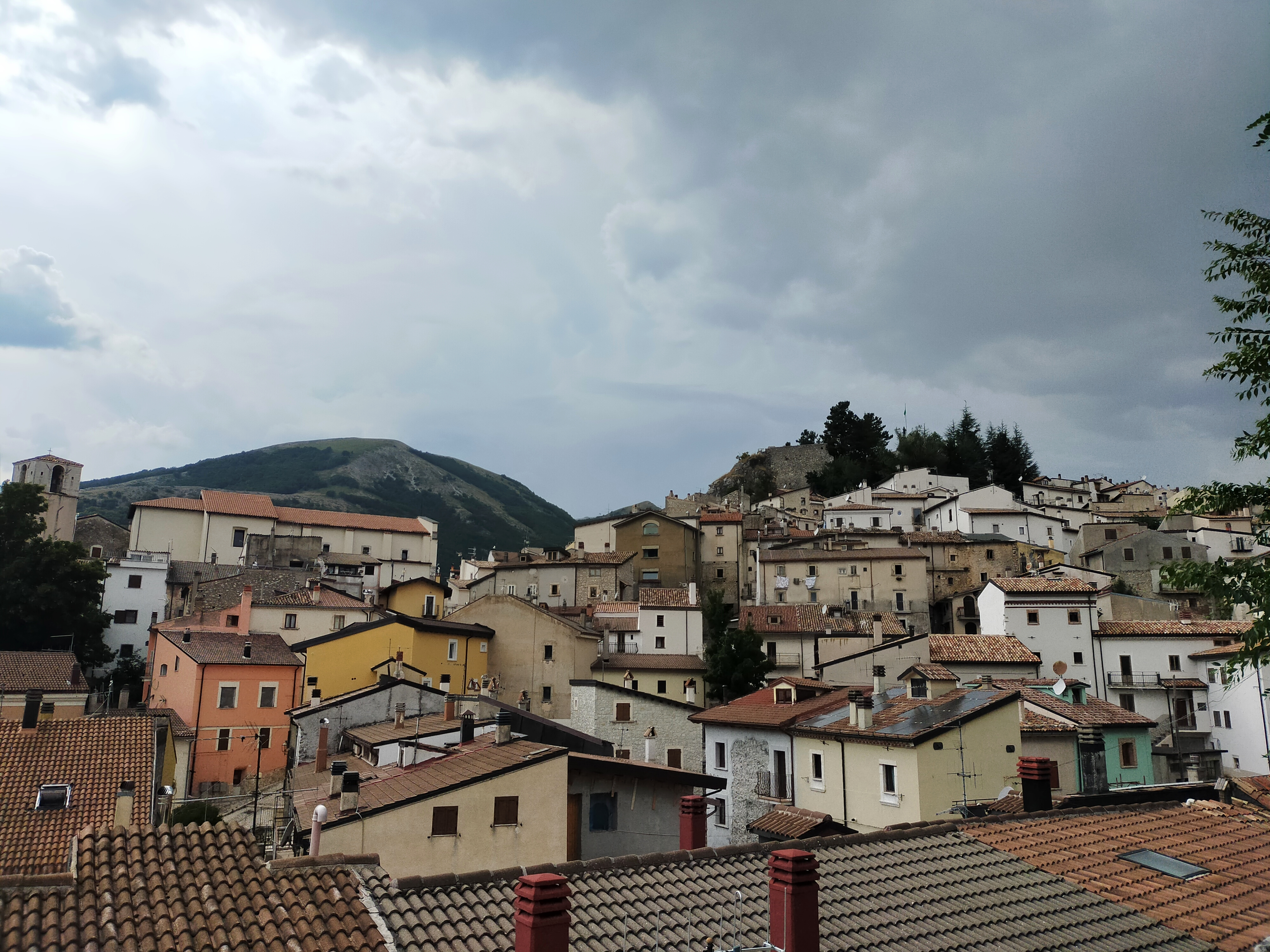

- Location within Italy Location within Abruzzo
- Coordinates: 42°8′17″N 13°31′1″E
- Country: Italy
- Region: Abruzzo
- Province: L'Aquila (AQ)
- Frazioni: Casalmartino, San Potito, Santo Iona

Government
  - Mayor: Angelo Simone Angelosante

Area
  - Total: 61.38 km^{2} (23.70 sq mi)
- Elevation: 1,375 m (4,511 ft)

Population (30 November 2017)
  - Total: 1,202
  - Density: 19.58/km^{2} (50.72/sq mi)
- Demonym: Ovindolesi
- Time zone: UTC+1 (CET)
  - Summer (DST): UTC+2 (CEST)
- Postal code: 67046
- Dialing code: 0863
- Saint day: 20 January
- Website: Official website

Ovindoli (Abruzzese: Dvinnërë) is a village and comune of the province of L'Aquila in the Abruzzo region of central Italy. Close to Rome, it is a resort for both summer and winter sports, including hiking, biking, equestrian activities and downhill and cross-country skiing.

== Geography ==
Ovindoli lies in the Apennine Mountains of Abruzzo, within the regional park of Sirente-Velino.

== History ==
Ovindoli became known a popular destination for downhill skiing following World War I, but it was not until 1959 that the mountain organized as a modern ski resort; at the time, it was called Valturvema. During the 1961–62 season, ski lifts began operating and the trails were expanded. Charles Rogers, an American working at that time in the US Embassy in Rome, served as President of the Society that worked to further develop the area as a ski resort and oversaw expansion activities. In 1994, the ski resort changed management and was named Monte Magnola and modernized with new trails, ski lifts and snow making capabilities.

== Twin towns ==
The town has been twinned with the following towns:

- Tarxien, Malta

== Climate ==
Climate data for Ovindoli, elevation 1,363 m (4,472 ft), (1951–2000)
Month	Jan	Feb	Mar	Apr	May	Jun	Jul	Aug	Sep	Oct	Nov	Dec	Year
Mean daily maximum °C (°F)	2.7 (36.9)	3.6 (38.5)	6.2 (43.2)	9.7 (49.5)	15.4 (59.7)	19.3 (66.7)	22.4 (72.3)	22.5 (72.5)	18.2 (64.8)	12.7 (54.9)	7.0 (44.6)	3.5 (38.3)	11.9 (53.5)
Daily mean °C (°F)	−1.1 (30.0)	−0.5 (31.1)	1.8 (35.2)	5.0 (41.0)	9.8 (49.6)	13.0 (55.4)	15.4 (59.7)	15.4 (59.7)	12.0 (53.6)	7.6 (45.7)	3.2 (37.8)	0.0 (32.0)	6.8 (44.2)
Mean daily minimum °C (°F)	−4.9 (23.2)	−4.6 (23.7)	−2.5 (27.5)	0.2 (32.4)	4.4 (39.9)	6.9 (44.4)	8.3 (46.9)	8.2 (46.8)	5.9 (42.6)	2.6 (36.7)	−0.7 (30.7)	−3.4 (25.9)	1.7 (35.1)
Average precipitation mm (inches)	77.9 (3.07)	88.5 (3.48)	74.0 (2.91)	94.0 (3.70)	65.4 (2.57)	52.4 (2.06)	40.4 (1.59)	36.7 (1.44)	66.8 (2.63)	102.1 (4.02)	144.5 (5.69)	118.8 (4.68)	961.5 (37.84)
Average precipitation days	8.4	8.0	8.5	10.2	8.6	7.0	5.1	4.7	6.2	8.4	10.7	9.8	95.6
Source: Regione Abruzzo
