= Lucoli =

- Comune
- Comune di Lucoli
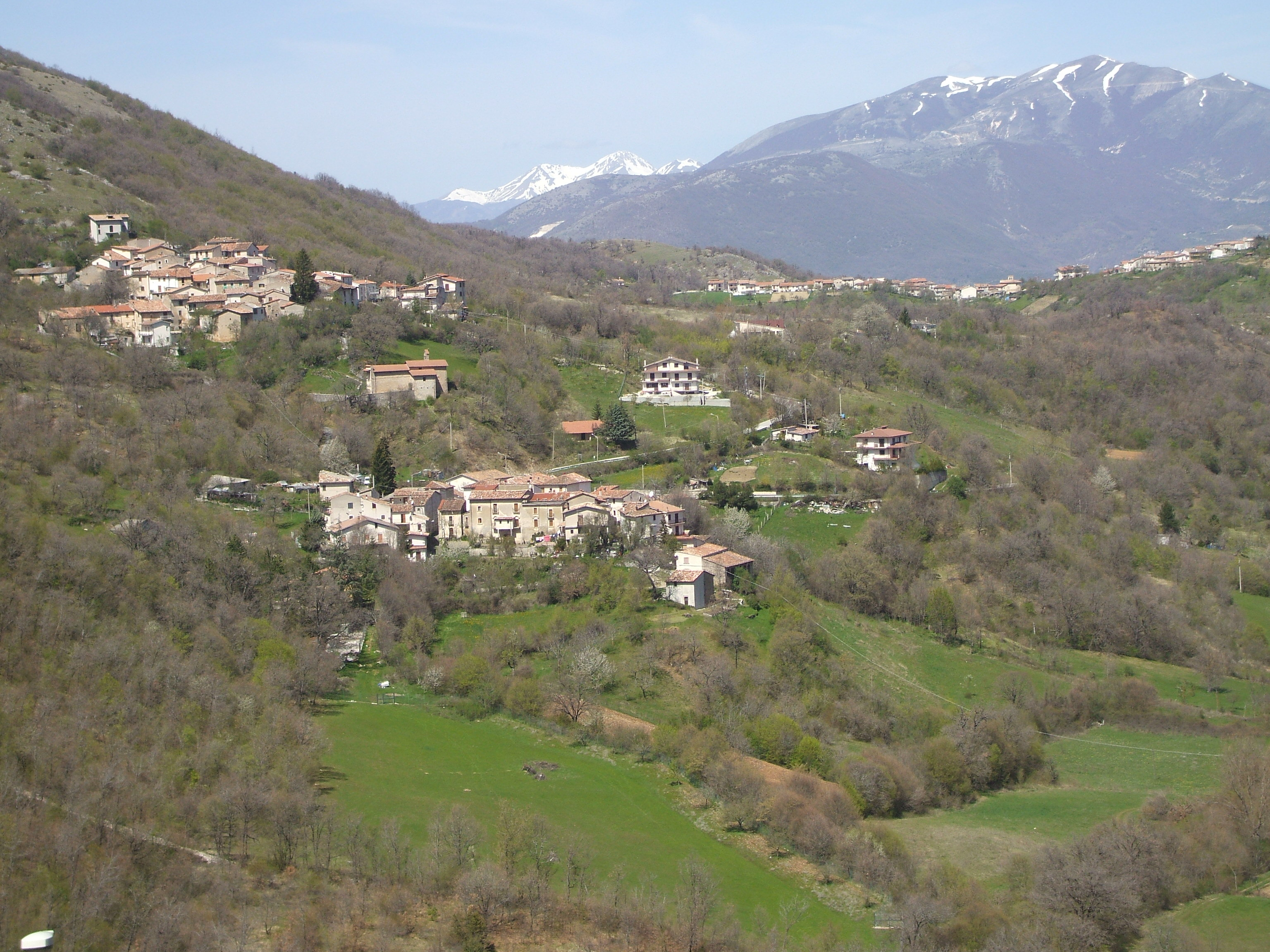

- Coat of arms

- Location within Italy Location within Abruzzo
- Coordinates: 42°17′31″N 13°20′20″E
- Country: Italy
- Region: Abruzzo
- Province: L'Aquila (AQ)
- Frazioni: Casamaina, Casavecchia, Colle di Lucoli, Collimento (sede comunale), Francolisco, Lucoli Alto, Peschiolo, Piaggia, Prata, Prato Lonaro, San Menna, Santa Croce, Sant'Andrea, Spogna, Spognetta, Vado Lucoli

Government
  - Mayor: Valter Chiappini

Area
  - Total: 109.77 km^{2} (42.38 sq mi)
- Elevation: 956 m (3,136 ft)

Population (31 December 2010)
  - Total: 1,029
  - Density: 9.374/km^{2} (24.28/sq mi)
- Demonym: Lucolani
- Time zone: UTC+1 (CET)
  - Summer (DST): UTC+2 (CEST)
- Postal code: 67045
- Dialing code: 0862
- ISTAT code: 066052
- Patron saint: San Giovanni Battista
- Saint day: 24 June
- Website: Official website

Lucoli is a comune (municipality) and town in the province of L'Aquila in the Abruzzo region of Italy. It is one of the nearest communes to the Campo Felice plain and ski resort.

The epicentre of 2009 L'Aquila earthquake was located near the communal north-eastern border.
