= Albe, Massa d'Albe =

Coordinates: 42°04′47″N 13°24′55″E

Albe
- Frazione
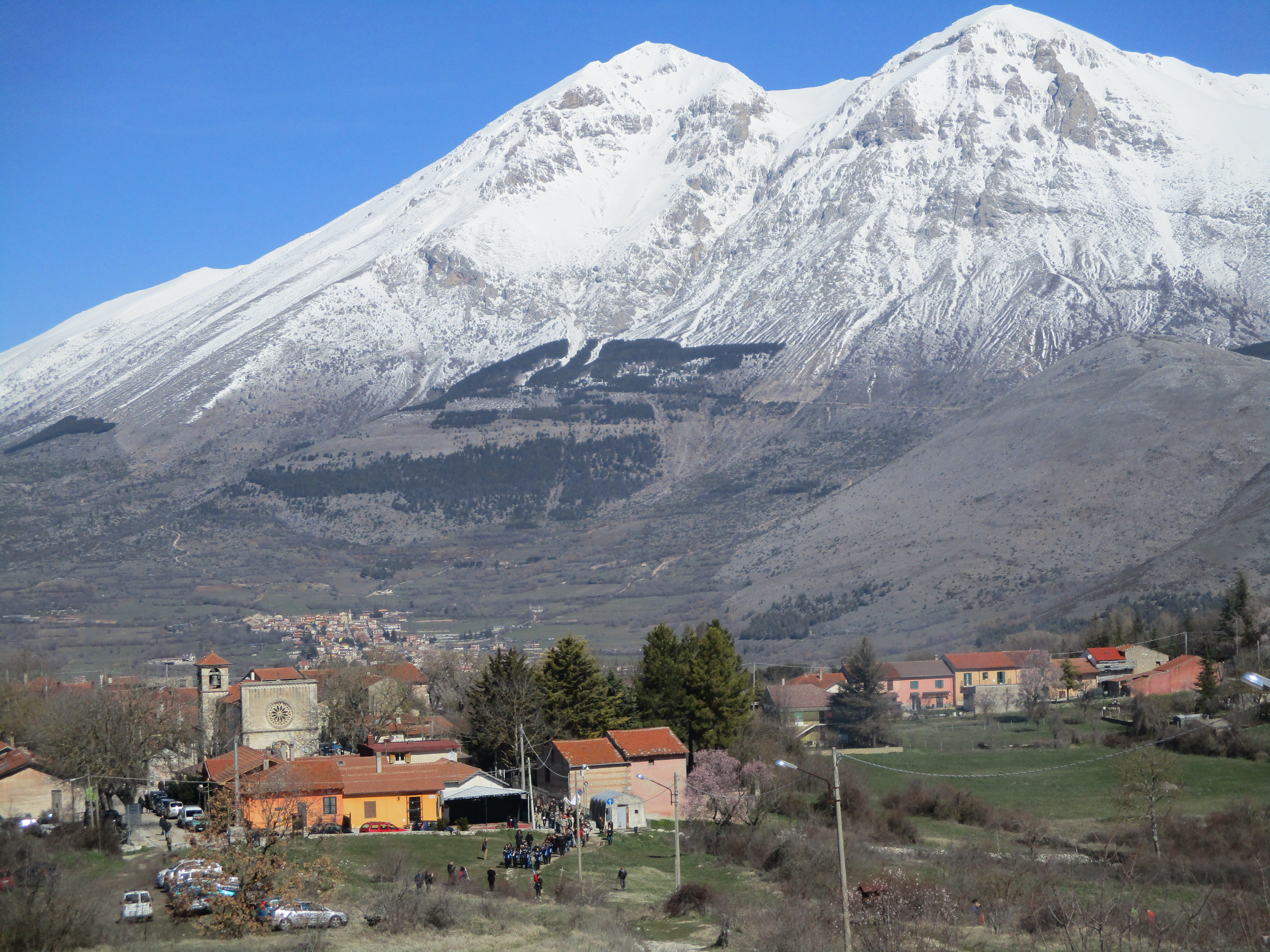
- Interactive map of Albe
- Country: Italy
- Region: Abruzzo
- Province: L'Aquila
- Commune: Massa d'Albe
- Time zone: UTC+1 (CET)
  - Summer (DST): UTC+2 (CEST)

Albe is a frazione of Massa d'Albe, in the Province of L'Aquila, in the Abruzzo, region of Italy.

During Middle Ages, Albe became the seat of the County of Albe. At different times it was controlled by several noble such as the Orsini. The medieval village was largely destroyed by the 1915 Marsica earthquake and was subsequently rebuilt near the archaeological site of Alba Fucens.
