= Sirente-Velino Regional Park =

Nature reserve in Italy

Parco regionale naturale del Sirente Velino
- IUCN category II (national park)
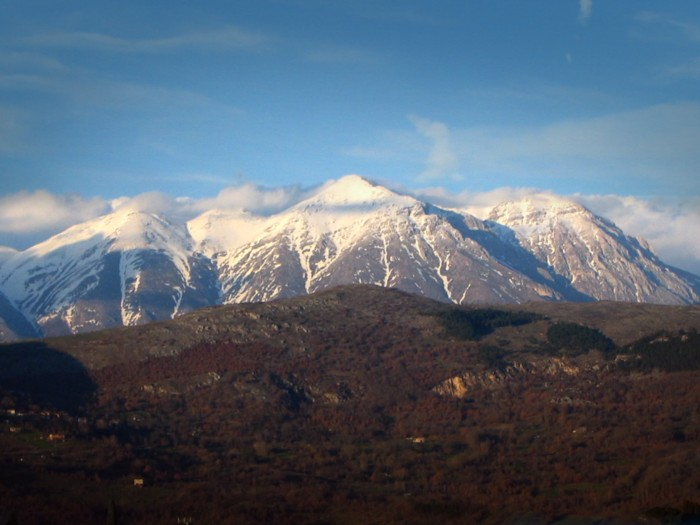
- Velino Massif

- Location within Italy
- Location: Abruzzo
- Nearest city: L'Aquila
- Coordinates: 42°12′21″N 13°31′13″E
- Area: 56,450 ha (139,500 acres)
- Established: 1989
- Governing body: Ministero dell'Ambiente
- Website: www.parcosirentevelino.it

The Sirente-Velino Regional Park (Italian: Parco regionale naturale del Sirente Velino) is a regional park in the province of L'Aquila, Abruzzo, central Italy.

It is centered on the Monte Velino and Monte Sirente massifs, including also the Rocche plateau and the Piani di Pezza and Campo Felice plains. The seat of the park is in Rocca di Mezzo.
