= Monte Sirente =

Mountain in Italy

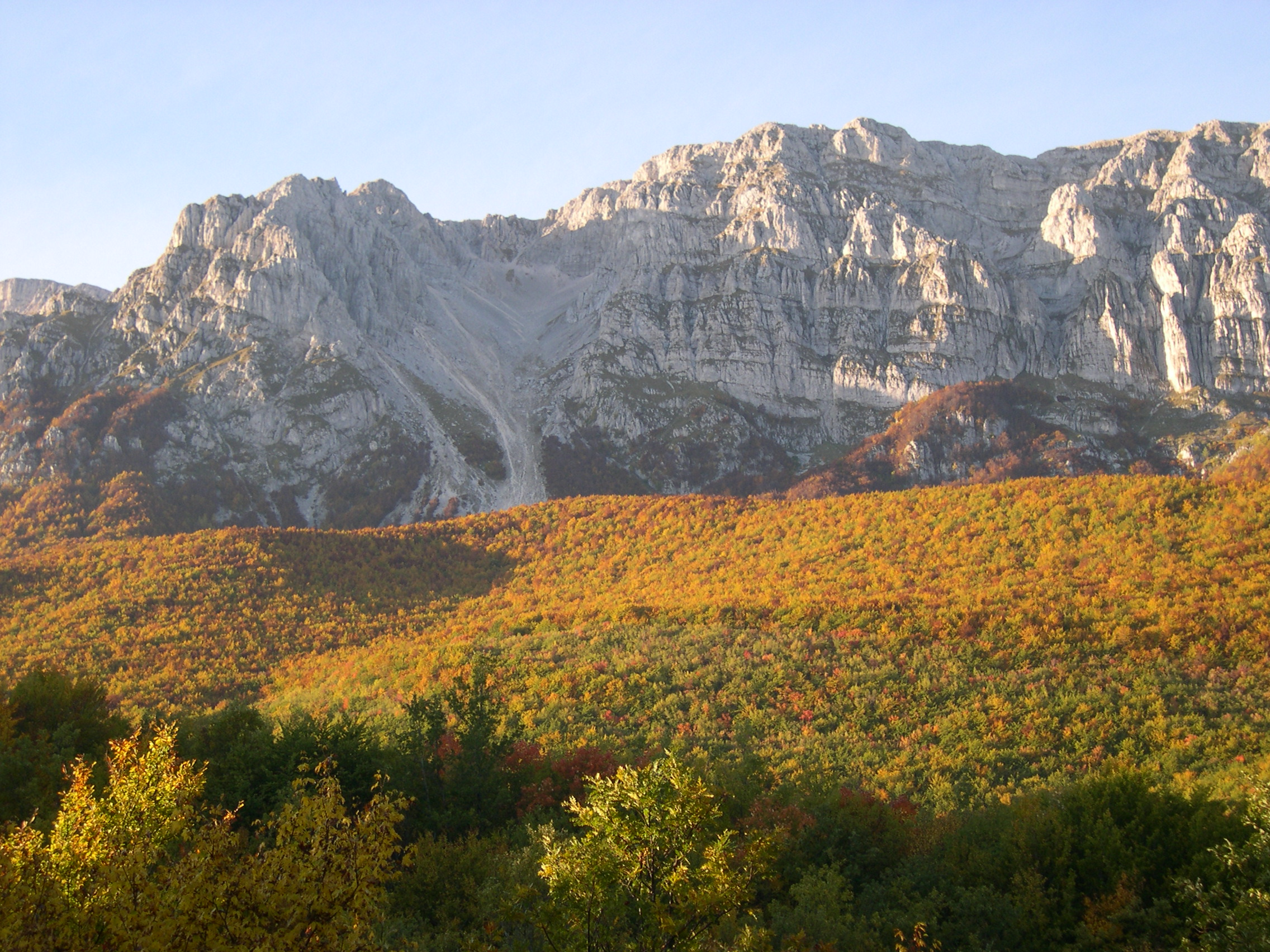

Highest point
- Elevation: 2,348 m (7,703 ft)
- Prominence: 1,000 m (3,300 ft)
- Listing: Ribu
- Coordinates: 42°08′46″N 13°36′40″E

Geography
- Location within Italy
- Location: Abruzzo, Italy
- Parent range: central Apennines

Monte Sirente is a mountain in Abruzzo, central Italy, the highest peak (at 2,348 m) of a small chain extending for c. 13 km from the Altopiano delle Rocche, the Marsica and the Valle Subequana, ending to the Fucino plain. It is part of the Sirente-Velino Regional Park.

The northern side of Sirente is characterized by deep gorges created by glaciers during the last Pleistocene glaciation. The southern side declines in a milder way towards the Fucino.

Nearby is the Sirente crater.

== See also ==
- Monte Velino
