= Monte Velino =

Mountain in Italy

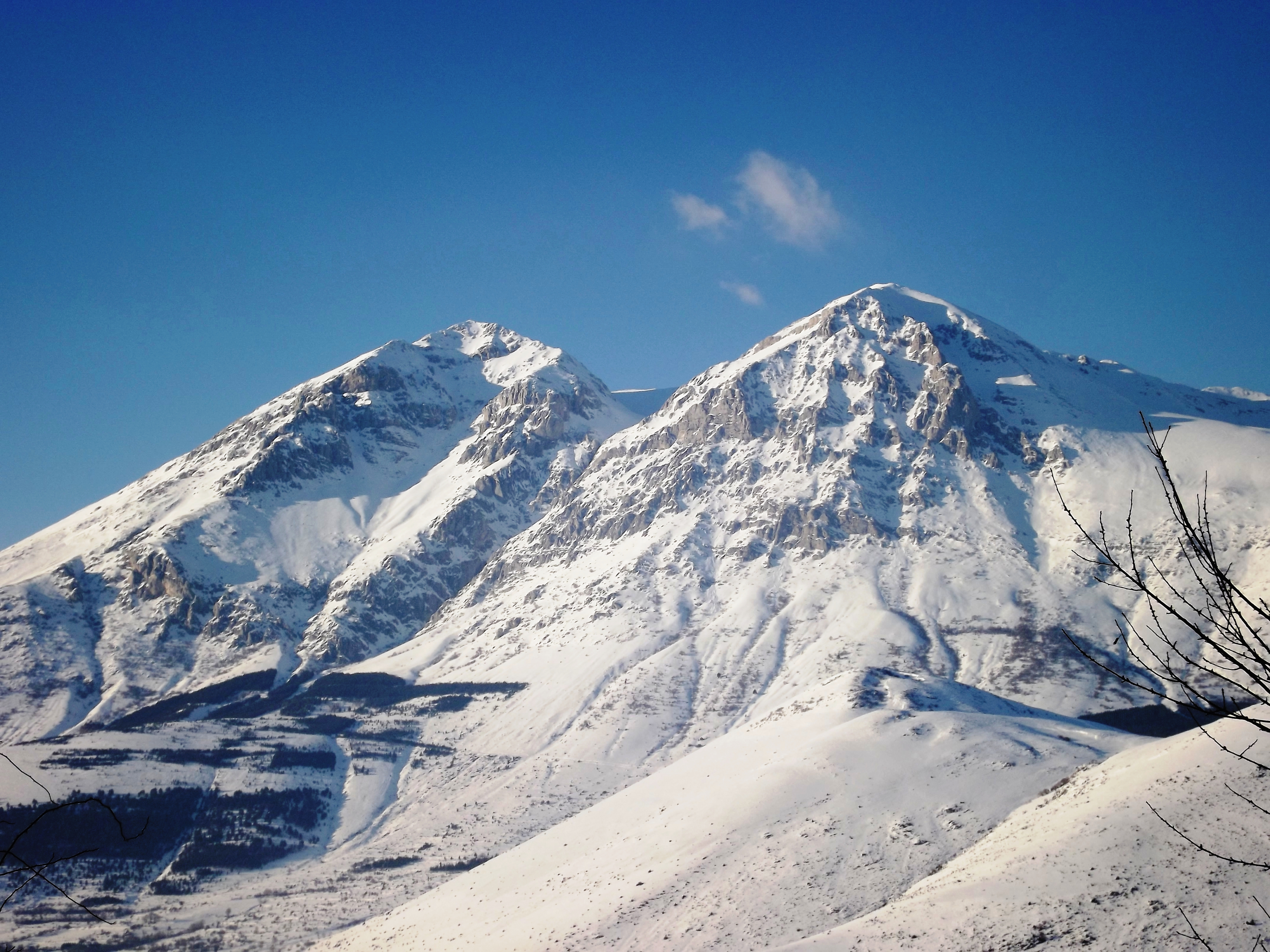
- The "twin peaks" of Monte Velino (left) and Monte Cafornia (right)

Highest point
- Elevation: 2,487 m (8,159 ft)
- Prominence: 1,385 m (4,544 ft)
- Listing: Ribu
- Coordinates: 42°09′N 13°22′E

Geography
- Location within Italy
- Location: Abruzzo, Italy
- Parent range: Central Apennines

Monte Velino is a mountain (2,487 m) in the province of L'Aquila, Abruzzo, central Italy, part of the Abruzzo Apennines.

== Background ==
Located nearby the boundary with Lazio, between the Fucino plain and the Aterno, Salto and Velino rivers' valleys, it is the highest peak in the Sirente-Velino Regional Park, and the highest point in the Tiber basin.

The massif is included in the Sirente-Velino Regional Park. It is characterized by a rough and desertic appearance, although specialized vegetation is widespread. Fauna includes Italian wolf and wild boar and the Marsican brown bear.

== See also ==
- Monte Sirente
