= Raccordo autostradale RA12 =

Controlled-access highway in Italy

Raccordo autostradale 12
- Motorway connection 12
- Raccordo autostradale Chieti-Pescara; Chieti-Pescara motorway connection Asse attrezzato Freeway

Route information
- Part of E80
- Maintained by ANAS
- Length: 14.8 km (9.2 mi)
- Existed: 1975–present

Major junctions
- West end: Chieti
- A25 in Chieti; A14 in San Giovanni Teatino
- East end: Pescara

Location
- Country: Italy
- Regions: Abruzzo

Highway system
- Roads in Italy; Autostrade; State; Regional; Provincial; Municipal
← RA 11	→ RA 13

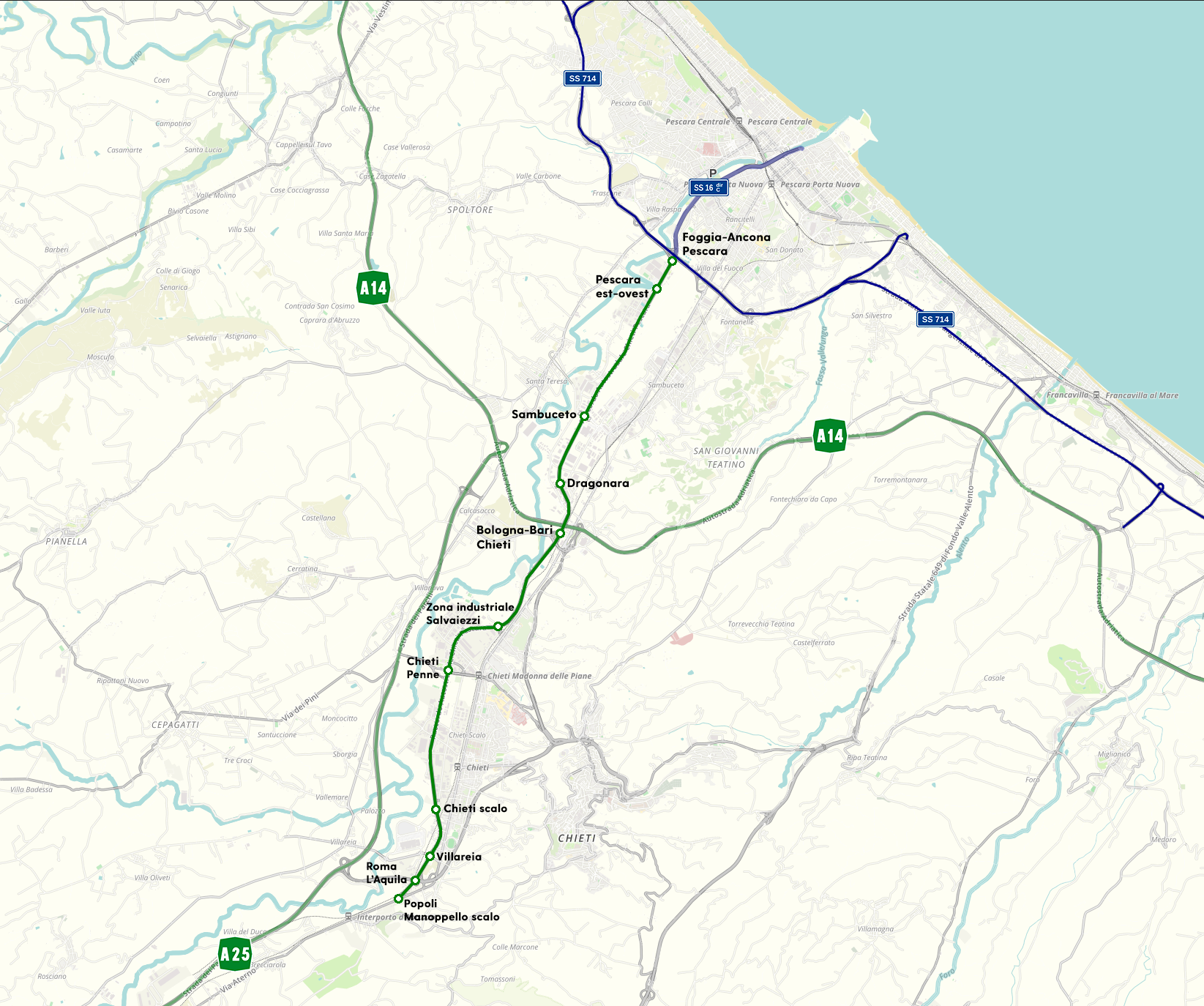
Detailed map of the Raccordo autostradale RA12

Raccordo autostradale 12 (RA 12; "Motorway connection 12"), also called Raccordo autostradale Chieti-Pescara ("Chieti-Pescara motorway connection") or Asse attrezzato ("Freeway"), is an autostrada (Italian for "motorway") 14.8 kilometres (9.2 mi) long in Italy located in the region of Abruzzo. It performs the function of east-west bypass of Pescara connecting it to the Autostrada A14, the Autostrada A25 and Chieti. It is part of the E80 European route.

== Route ==
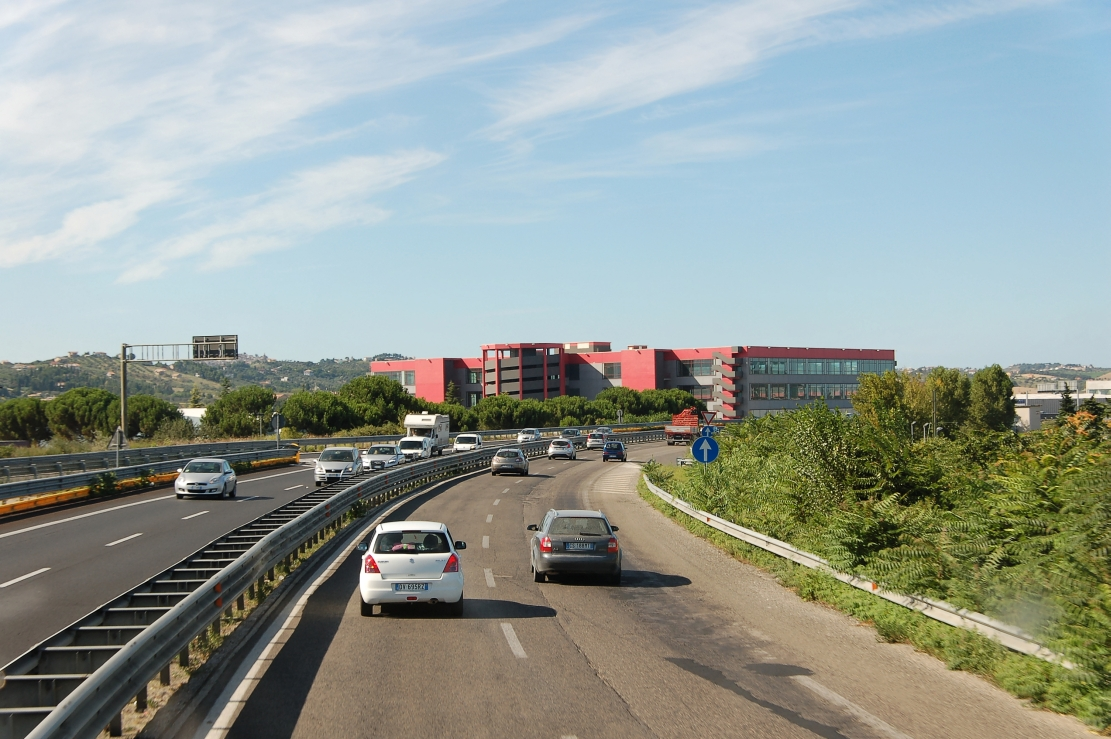
Raccordo autostradale RA12 near San Giovanni Teatino

RACCORDO AUTOSTRADALE 12; Raccordo autostradale Chieti-Pescara; Asse attrezzato
Exit	↓km↓	↑km↑	Province	European Route
Via Tiburtina Valeria; Popoli; Manoppello scalo	0.0 km (0 mi)	14.8 km (9.2 mi)	CH	E80
Avezzano; Roma-L'Aquila; Val Pescara-Chieti	0.5 km (0.31 mi)	13.8 km (8.6 mi)	CH	E80
Villareia; Chieti Scalo	1.0 km (0.62 mi)	13.3 km (8.3 mi)	CH	E80
Chieti railway station Industrial area	1.9 km (1.2 mi)	12.4 km (7.7 mi)	CH	E80
Chieti; Piceno Aprutina	4.6 km (2.9 mi)	9.9 km (6.2 mi)	CH	E80
Salvaiezzi industrial area	5.5 km (3.4 mi)	9.0 km (5.6 mi)	CH	E80
Salvaiezzi industrial area Chieti railway station	6.0 km (3.7 mi)	8.3 km (5.2 mi)	CH	E80
Bologna-Bari; Val Pescara-Chieti	7.8 km (4.8 mi)	6.0 km (3.7 mi)	CH	E80
Dragonara	9.3 km (5.8 mi)	5.0 km (3.1 mi)	CH	E80
Sambuceto; Commercial area	10.6 km (6.6 mi)	3.6 km (2.2 mi)	CH	E80
Pescara est-ovest Industrial area	13.4 km (8.3 mi)	0.7 km (0.43 mi)	PE	E80
Adriatica; Adriatico – Giovanni Cornacchia Stadium; Pescara Airport; Tangenziale di Pescara	14.2 km (8.8 mi)	0.5 km (0.31 mi)	PE	E80
Adriatica; Tangenziale di Pescara	14.8 km (9.2 mi)	0.0 km (0 mi)	PE	E80
del Porto di Pescara; Pescara centro Port of Pescara	14.8 km (9.2 mi)	0.0 km (0 mi)	PE	E80

== See also ==
- Autostrade of Italy
- Roads in Italy
- Transport in Italy

=== Other Italian roads ===
- State highways (Italy)
- Regional road (Italy)
- Provincial road (Italy)
- Municipal road (Italy)
