= Autostrada A24 (Italy) =

Controlled-access highway in Italy

Autostrada A24
- Strada dei Parchi; Parks motorway

Route information
- Part of E80
- Maintained by ANAS
- Length: 166 km (103 mi)
- Existed: 1969–present

Major junctions
- West end: Rome
- A90 in Rome; A1 in Tivoli; A25 in Tagliacozzo
- East end: Teramo

Location
- Country: Italy
- Regions: Lazio, Abruzzo

Highway system
- Roads in Italy; Autostrade; State; Regional; Provincial; Municipal
| ← A 23 | → A 25 |

The Autostrada A24, or Strada dei Parchi ("Parks motorway") is an autostrada (Italian for "motorway") 166 kilometres (103 mi) long in Italy located in the regions of Lazio and Abruzzo connecting Rome to Teramo, near the Adriatic Sea. Starting from the Grande Raccordo Anulare (A90 or GRA – the Rome orbital motorway), the A24 runs broadly north-east across the Abruzzese Apennine Mountains. Between L'Aquila and Teramo it passes through the 10 kilometres (6.2 mi) Gran Sasso Tunnel. The private company Strada dei Parchi S.p.A. currently manages the motorway. The name "Parks Motorway" comes from the fact that the Maiella National Park, the Abruzzo, Lazio and Molise National Park and the Gran Sasso e Monti della Laga National Park can be reached from this motorway. It is a part of the E80 European route.

Near the Lazio and Abruzzo border the Autostrada A25 splits from the A24 and reaches the Adriatic Coast at Pescara.

It is constructed in an almost completely hilly and mountainous territory with a complex orography. For this reason, the motorway required the adoption of daring civil engineering solutions, with extensive stretches utilising viaducts and 42 tunnels (four of which are longer than 4 kilometres (2.5 mi)) including the Gran Sasso Tunnel, whose length (10.174 kilometres (6.322 mi) for the northern tunnel, 10.175 kilometres (6.322 mi) the southern) made it the longest double-tube road tunnel in Europe, as well as the longest road tunnel in Italy entirely in the national territory.

First planned in 1973 to connect Lazio and Abruzzo as well as the Autostrada A1 and the Autostrada A14, the motorway ends at Teramo, about 17 kilometres (10 mi) far from the Autostrada A14. This gap is covered by a freeway since the early 2000's.

The highway includes three long tunnels under the highest Appennine mountain, the Gran Sasso massif, on a south west/north east axis, with each tunnel just over 6.3 miles in length. Two of the tunnels are part of the Traforo del Gran Sasso, while the third tunnel, dug adjacent the two highway tunnels, hosts the Laboratori Nazionali del Gran Sasso (National Laboratories of the Gran Sasso), the largest underground particle physics laboratory in the world.

Together with the A25, it provides a fast and reliable connection between the capital and the central-eastern regions of the peninsula; previously, the natural subdivision imposed by the highest peaks of the Apennines had made travel between the two seas difficult, slow and treacherous. The A24 reduced the isolation of Abruzzo from the Tyrrhenian regions, and together with the A25 became the main link between the Tyrrhenian and the Adriatic in central Italy. Until its completion, communications took place mainly via the winding State roads Salaria, Flaminia and Tiburtina Valeria.

A24, a film company based in the United States, is named after the Autostrada A24. Daniel Katz, the founder of the company, chose this name because he decided to create the company while driving on the A24.

== Route ==
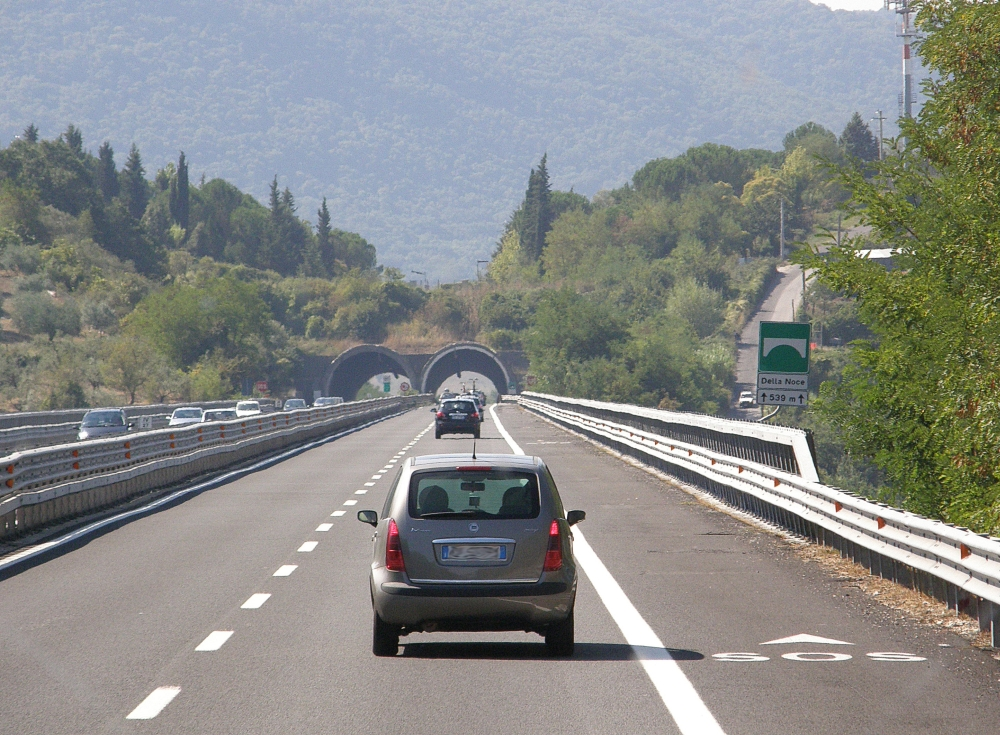
Autostrada A24 near Rome

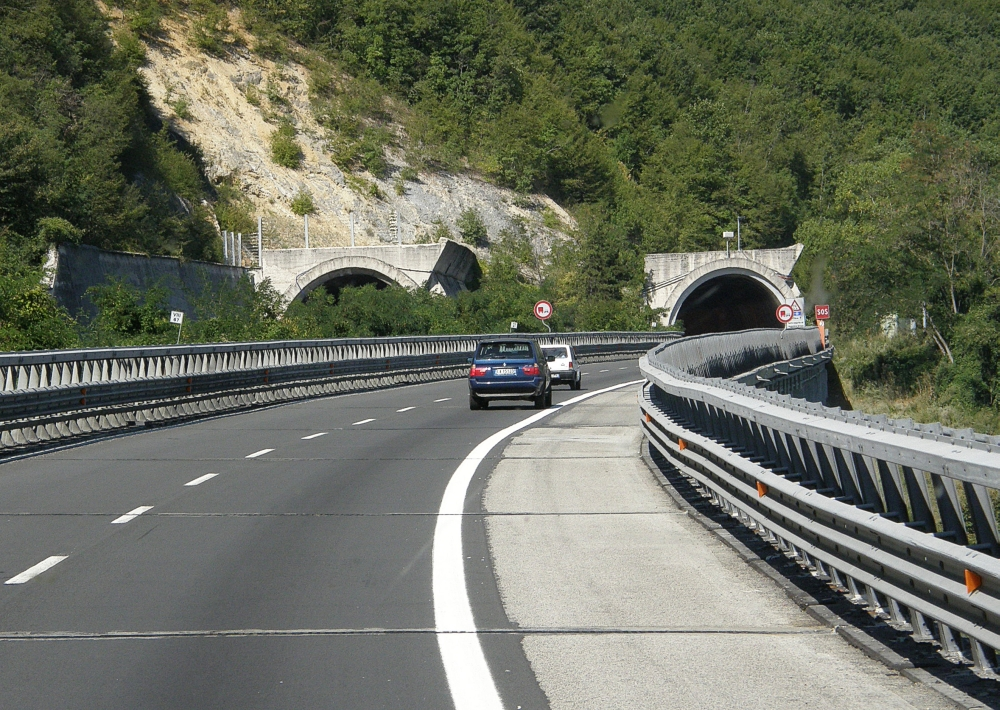
Autostrada A24 between Borgorose and Tagliacozzo

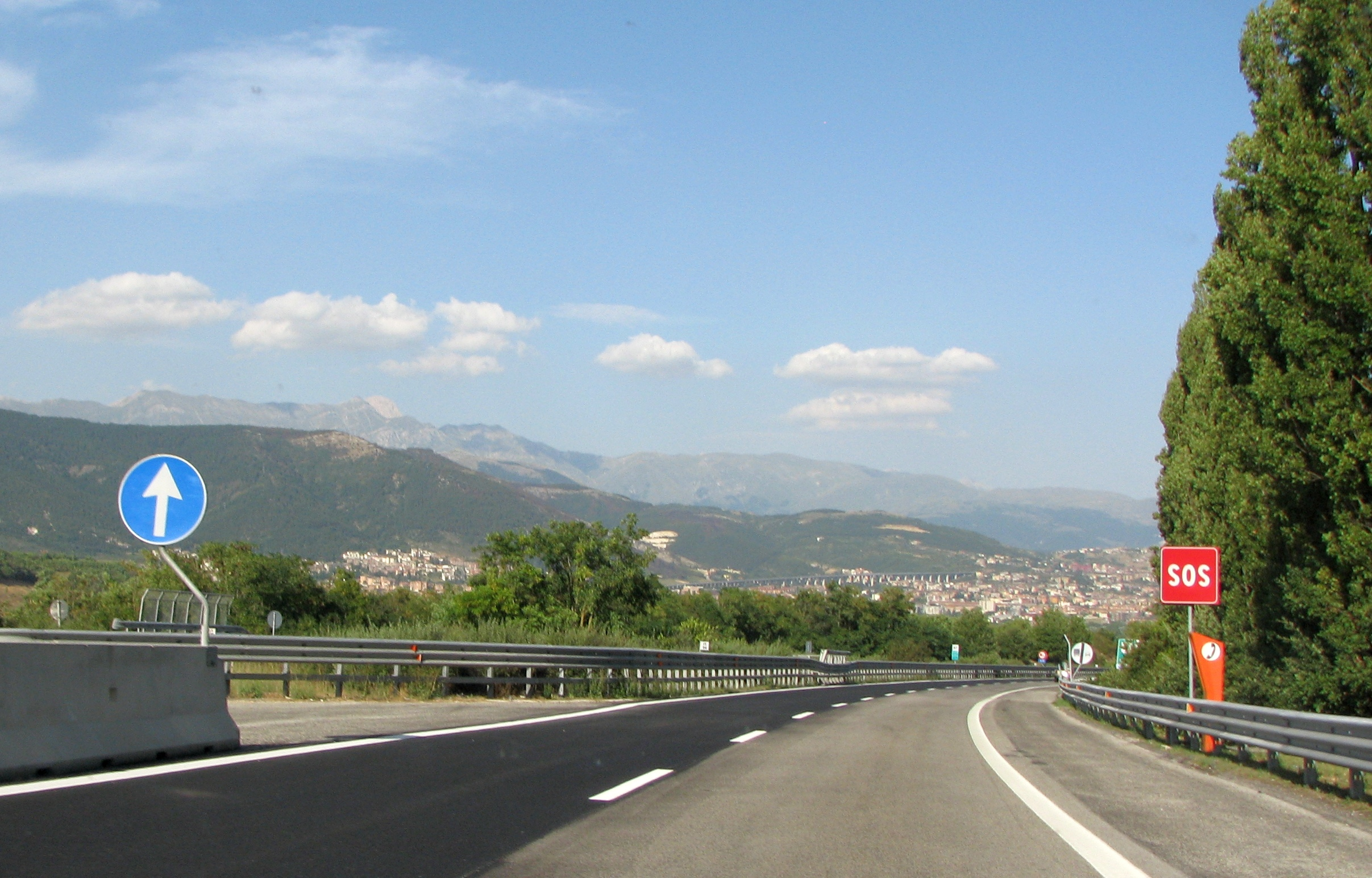
Autostrada A24 near L'Aquila

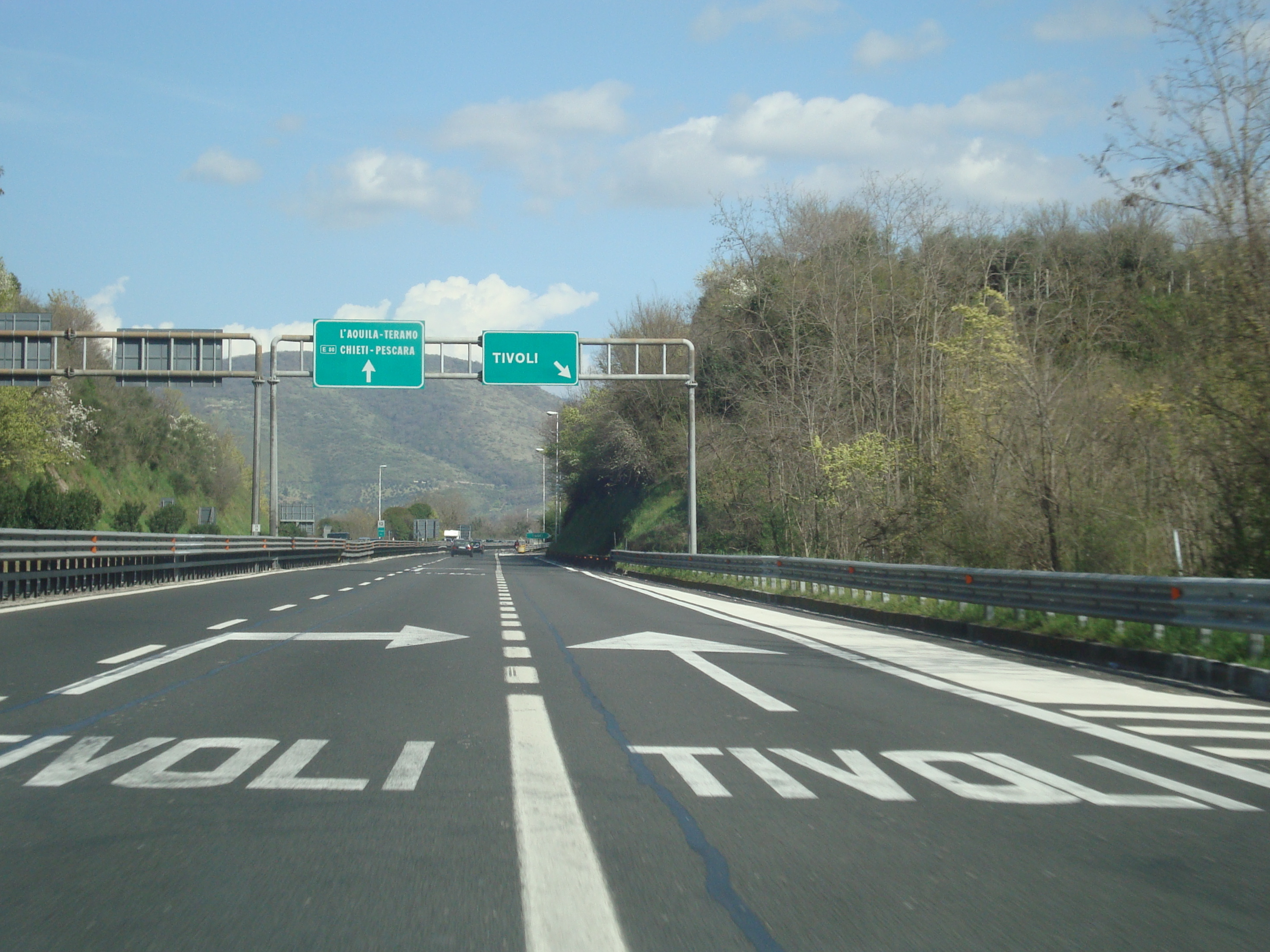
Autostrada A24 near Tivoli

ROMA - TERAMO; Strada dei Parchi
| Exit | ↓km↓ | ↑km↑ | Province | European Road |
| Grande Raccordo Anulare | 0 km (0 mi) | 166 km (103 mi) | RM | |
| Settecamini; Via Tiburtina | 7 km (4.3 mi) | 159 km (99 mi) | RM | E80 |
| Lunghezza | 15 km (9.3 mi) | 151 km (94 mi) | RM | E80 |
| Toll gate Roma Est | 15 km (9.3 mi) | 151 km (94 mi) | RM | E80 |
| Rest area "Colle del Tasso" | 17 km (11 mi) | 149 km (93 mi) | RM | E80 |
| Milano - Napoli | 18 km (11 mi) | 148 km (92 mi) | RM | E80 |
| Tivoli; Via Tiburtina | 20 km (12 mi) | 146 km (91 mi) | RM | E80 |
| Castel Madama | 31 km (19 mi) | 135 km (84 mi) | RM | E80 |
| Vicovaro - Mandela | 40 km (25 mi) | 126 km (78 mi) | RM | E80 |
| Rest area "Civita" | 54 km (34 mi) | 112 km (70 mi) | AQ | E80 |
| Carsoli - Oricola | 57 km (35 mi) | 109 km (68 mi) | AQ | E80 |
| Tagliacozzo | 68 km (42 mi) | 97 km (60 mi) | AQ | E80 |
| Pescara - Chieti; Maiella National Park; Abruzzo, Lazio and Molise National Park | 72 km (45 mi) | 94 km (58 mi) | RI | |
| Valle del Salto; Salto Cicolana - Rieti | 75 km (47 mi) | 91 km (57 mi) | RI | |
| Tornimparte del Parco Regionale Sirente-Velino; Campo Felice | 92 km (57 mi) | 74 km (46 mi) | AQ | |
| Rest area "Valle Aterno" | 106 km (66 mi) | 60 km (37 mi) | AQ | |
| L'Aquila Ovest del Gran Sasso d'Italia - Teramo dell'Appennino Abruzzese ed Appulo-Sannitico - Antrodoco | 108 km (67 mi) | 58 km (36 mi) | AQ | |
| L'Aquila Est; Tangenziale Est dell'Aquila - Pescara | 114 km (71 mi) | 52 km (32 mi) | AQ | |
| Assergi; Campo Imperatore; Gran Sasso e Monti della Laga National Park | 117 km (73 mi) | 42 km (26 mi) | AQ | |
| Traforo del Gran Sasso | 118 km (73 mi) | 40 km (25 mi) | AQ/TE | |
| Colledara - San Gabriele; St. Gabriel's shrine Isola del Gran Sasso d'Italia - Castelli; Gran Sasso e Monti della Laga National Park | 143 km (89 mi) | 23 km (14 mi) | TE | |
| Toll gate Teramo | 147 km (91 mi) | 11 km (6.8 mi) | TE | |
| Basciano - Villa Vomano ex di Bisenti - Bisenti; Piceno-Aprutina - Teramo; Piceno-Aprutina - Chieti | 156 km (97 mi) | 10 km (6.2 mi) | TE | |
| Val Vomano della Valle del Vomano - Roseto degli Abruzzi | 159 km (99 mi) | 7 km (4.3 mi) | TE | |
| Teramo; Bologna - Taranto | 166 km (103 mi) | 0 km (0 mi) | TE | |

== See also ==
- Autostrade of Italy
- Roads in Italy
- Transport in Italy
- A24

=== Other Italian roads ===
- State highways (Italy)
- Regional road (Italy)
- Provincial road (Italy)
- Municipal road (Italy)
