= Torano =

Torano may refer to a number of places in Italy:

- Torano Castello, Italian commune in the Province of Cosenza
- Torano Nuovo, Italian commune in the Province of Teramo
- Torano di Borgorose, frazione of the commune of Borgorose (Province of Rieti), known for the junction between the Autostrada A24 and the Autostrada A25
- Torano (river), a river which forms part of the Volturno basin
- Torano (Carrara), frazione of the commune of Carrara (Province of Massa-Carrara)
