= 2016 Tirreno–Adriatico =

2016 UCI World Tour, race 3 of 28

Race details
- Dates: 9–15 March 2016
- Stages: 7
- Distance: 850.8 km (528.7 mi)

Results
Jersey awarded to the overall winner	Winner	Greg Van Avermaet (BEL)	(BMC Racing Team)
	Second	Peter Sagan (SVK)	(Tinkoff)
	Third	Bob Jungels (LUX)	(Etixx–Quick-Step)
Jersey awarded to the points classification winner	Points	Peter Sagan (SVK)	(Tinkoff)
Jersey awarded to the mountains classification winner	Mountains	Cesare Benedetti (ITA)	(Bora–Argon 18)
Jersey awarded to the youth classification winner	Youth	Bob Jungels (LUX)	(Etixx–Quick-Step)
	Team	Etixx–Quick-Step	

The 51st edition of the Tirreno–Adriatico cycling stage race was held from 9 to 15 March 2016. It was the third event of the 2016 UCI World Tour. Due to the cancellation of stage 5, the race was run over six stages, covering a total distance of 850.8 km (529 mi). (Note: Originally scheduled as 1,019.8 km (634 mi), the distance was scaled back to 850.8 km (529 mi) after the cancellation of stage 5.)

== Route ==
The route for the 2016 Tirreno–Adriatico was announced in December 2015 in Camaiore, where the race starts. The first stage is a 22.7-kilometre (14.1 mi) team time trial on the coast. The second – and first road stage – finishes on a short climb, suiting classics riders. The third and fourth stages have flat finishes, favouring sprinters. The fifth stage is the queen stage of the race: it features five categorised climbs, finishing with the 13-kilometre (8.1 mi) ascent of Monte San Vicino. The sixth stage again suits sprinters. The race finishes in San Benedetto del Tronto for the fiftieth consecutive year with a 10.1-kilometre (6.3 mi) individual time trial to decide the final standings.

Stage schedule
Stage	Date	Route	Distance	Type	Winner
1	9 March	Lido di Camaiore	22.7 km (14 mi)	Team time trial	BMC Racing Team
2	10 March	Camaiore to Pomarance	207 km (129 mi)	Hilly stage	Zdeněk Štybar (CZE)
3	11 March	Castelnuovo di Val di Cecina to Montalto di Castro	176 km (109 mi)	Flat stage	Fernando Gaviria (COL)
4	12 March	Montalto di Castro to Foligno	216 km (134 mi)	Hilly stage	Steve Cummings (GBR)
5	13 March	Foligno to Monte San Vicino	178 km (111 mi)	Mountain stage	cancelled due to snow
6	14 March	Castelraimondo to Cepagatti	210 km (130 mi)	Flat stage	Greg Van Avermaet (BEL)
7	15 March	San Benedetto del Tronto	10.1 km (6 mi)	Individual time trial	Fabian Cancellara (SUI)

== Participating teams ==
As Tirreno–Adriatico is a UCI World Tour event, all eighteen UCI Pro Teams were invited automatically and obliged to enter a team into the race. Five other teams were given wild cards to enter the race. All teams sent the allowed number of riders, eight, totaling 184 riders.

UCI WorldTeams

- AG2R La Mondiale
- Astana
- BMC Racing Team
- Team Dimension Data
- Etixx–Quick-Step
- FDJ
- IAM Cycling
- Lampre–Merida
- Lotto–Soudal
- Movistar Team
- Team Giant–Alpecin
- Team Katusha
- LottoNL–Jumbo
- Team Sky
- Tinkoff
- Trek–Segafredo
- Cannondale
- Orica–GreenEDGE

UCI Professional Continental teams

- Androni Giocattoli–Sidermec
- Bardiani–CSF
- Bora–Argon 18
- Caja Rural–Seguros RGA
- CCC–Sprandi–Polkowice

== Stages ==
=== Stage 1 ===
9 March 2016 – Lido di Camaiore, 22.7 km (14.1 mi) (TTT)

Stage 1 Result

	Team	Time
1	BMC Racing Team	23' 55"
2	Etixx–Quick-Step	+ 2"
3	FDJ	+ 9"
4	Tinkoff	+ 11"
5	IAM Cycling	+ 12"
6	Astana	+ 15"
7	Trek–Segafredo	+ 17"
8	Team Sky	+ 21"
9	Orica–GreenEDGE	+ 25"
10	Movistar Team	+ 29"

General Classification after Stage 1

	Rider	Team	Time
1	Daniel Oss (ITA)	BMC Racing Team	22' 55"
2	Tejay van Garderen (USA)	BMC Racing Team	+ 0"
3	Greg Van Avermaet (BEL)	BMC Racing Team	+ 0"
4	Taylor Phinney (USA)	BMC Racing Team	+ 0"
5	Manuel Quinziato (ITA)	BMC Racing Team	+ 0"
6	Damiano Caruso (ITA)	BMC Racing Team	+ 0"
7	Gianluca Brambilla (ITA)	Etixx–Quick-Step	+ 2"
8	Yves Lampaert (BEL)	Etixx–Quick-Step	+ 2"
9	Bob Jungels (LUX)	Etixx–Quick-Step	+ 2"
10	Zdenek Štybar (CZE)	Etixx–Quick-Step	+ 2"

=== Stage 2 ===
10 March 2016 — Camaiore to Pomarance, 207 km (128.6 mi)

Stage 2 Result

	Rider	Team	Time
1	Zdenek Štybar (CZE)	Etixx–Quick-Step	5h 10' 03"
2	Peter Sagan (SVK)	Tinkoff	+ 1"
3	Edvald Boasson Hagen (NOR)	Team Dimension Data	+ 1"
4	Simon Clarke (AUS)	Cannondale	+ 1"
5	Alejandro Valverde (ESP)	Movistar Team	+ 1"
6	Vincenzo Nibali (ITA)	Astana	+ 1"
7	Greg Van Avermaet (BEL)	BMC Racing Team	+ 1"
8	Tiesj Benoot (BEL)	Lotto–Soudal	+ 1"
9	Michał Kwiatkowski (POL)	Team Sky	+ 1"
10	Gianluca Brambilla (ITA)	Etixx–Quick-Step	+ 1"

General Classification after Stage 2

	Rider	Team	Time
1	Zdenek Štybar (CZE)	Etixx–Quick-Step	5h 33' 50"
2	Greg Van Avermaet (BEL)	BMC Racing Team	+ 9"
3	Tejay van Garderen (USA)	BMC Racing Team	+ 9"
4	Damiano Caruso (ITA)	BMC Racing Team	+ 9"
5	Daniel Oss (ITA)	BMC Racing Team	+ 9"
6	Gianluca Brambilla (ITA)	Etixx–Quick-Step	+ 11"
7	Bob Jungels (LUX)	Etixx–Quick-Step	+ 11"
8	Peter Sagan (SVK)	Tinkoff	+ 14"
9	Thibaut Pinot (FRA)	FDJ	+ 18"
10	Sébastien Reichenbach (SUI)	FDJ	+ 18"

=== Stage 3 ===
11 March 2016 — Castelnuovo Val di Cecina to Montalto di Castro, 176 km (109.4 mi)

Stage 3 Result

	Rider	Team	Time
1	Fernando Gaviria (COL)	Etixx–Quick-Step	4h 17' 28"
2	Caleb Ewan (AUS)	Orica–GreenEDGE	s.t.
3	Elia Viviani (ITA)	Team Sky	s.t.
4	Peter Sagan (SVK)	Tinkoff	s.t.
5	Leigh Howard (AUS)	IAM Cycling	s.t.
6	Giacomo Nizzolo (ITA)	Trek–Segafredo	s.t.
7	Zico Waeytens (BEL)	Team Giant–Alpecin	s.t.
8	Sacha Modolo (ITA)	Lampre–Merida	s.t.
9	Moreno Hofland (NED)	LottoNL–Jumbo	s.t.
10	Nikias Arndt (GER)	Team Giant–Alpecin	s.t.

General Classification after Stage 3

	Rider	Team	Time
1	Zdenek Štybar (CZE)	Etixx–Quick-Step	9h 51' 18"
2	Damiano Caruso (ITA)	BMC Racing Team	+ 9"
3	Daniel Oss (ITA)	BMC Racing Team	+ 9"
4	Tejay van Garderen (USA)	BMC Racing Team	+ 9"
5	Greg Van Avermaet (BEL)	BMC Racing Team	+ 9"
6	Gianluca Brambilla (ITA)	Etixx–Quick-Step	+ 11"
7	Bob Jungels (LUX)	Etixx–Quick-Step	+ 11"
8	Peter Sagan (SVK)	Tinkoff	+ 14"
9	Thibaut Pinot (FRA)	FDJ	+ 18"
10	Sébastien Reichenbach (SUI)	FDJ	+ 18"

=== Stage 4 ===
12 March 2016 — Montalto di Castro to Foligno, 222 km (137.9 mi)

Stage 4 Result

	Rider	Team	Time
1	Steve Cummings (GBR)	Team Dimension Data	6h 04' 49"
2	Salvatore Puccio (ITA)	Team Sky	+ 13"
3	Natnael Berhane (ERI)	Team Dimension Data	+ 13"
4	Daniel Moreno (ESP)	Movistar Team	+ 13"
5	Jan Bakelants (BEL)	AG2R La Mondiale	+ 13"
6	Matteo Montaguti (ITA)	AG2R La Mondiale	+ 16"
7	Peter Sagan (SVK)	Tinkoff	+ 25"
8	Greg Van Avermaet (BEL)	BMC Racing Team	+ 25"
9	Tiesj Benoot (BEL)	Lotto–Soudal	+ 25"
10	Zdenek Štybar (CZE)	Etixx–Quick-Step	+ 25"

General Classification after Stage 4

	Rider	Team	Time
1	Zdenek Štybar (CZE)	Etixx–Quick-Step	9h 51' 18"
2	Damiano Caruso (ITA)	BMC Racing Team	+ 9"
3	Greg Van Avermaet (BEL)	BMC Racing Team	+ 9"
4	Tejay van Garderen (USA)	BMC Racing Team	+ 9"
5	Bob Jungels (LUX)	Etixx–Quick-Step	+ 11"
6	Gianluca Brambilla (ITA)	Etixx–Quick-Step	+ 11"
7	Peter Sagan (SVK)	Tinkoff	+ 14"
8	Thibaut Pinot (FRA)	FDJ	+ 18"
9	Sébastien Reichenbach (SUI)	FDJ	+ 18"
10	Roman Kreuziger (CZE)	Tinkoff	+ 20"

=== Stage 5 ===
13 March 2016 — Foligno to Monte San Vicino, 178 km (110.6 mi)

Stage cancelled due to snow.

=== Stage 6 ===
14 March 2016 — Castelraimondo to Cepagatti, 210 km (130.5 mi)

Stage 6 Result

	Rider	Team	Time
1	Greg Van Avermaet (BEL)	BMC Racing Team	4h 34' 14"
2	Peter Sagan (SVK)	Tinkoff	s.t.
3	Michał Kwiatkowski (POL)	Team Sky	+ 2"
4	Zdenek Štybar (CZE)	Etixx–Quick-Step	+ 4"
5	Caleb Ewan (AUS)	Orica–GreenEDGE	+ 7"
6	Alejandro Valverde (ESP)	Movistar Team	+ 7"
7	Sacha Modolo (ITA)	Lampre–Merida	+ 7"
8	Jürgen Roelandts (BEL)	Lotto–Soudal	+ 7"
9	Sonny Colbrelli (ITA)	Bardiani–CSF	+ 7"
10	Moreno Hofland (NED)	LottoNL–Jumbo	+ 7"

General Classification after Stage 6

	Rider	Team	Time
1	Greg Van Avermaet (BEL)	BMC Racing Team	20h 30' 43"
2	Zdenek Štybar (CZE)	Etixx–Quick-Step	+ 7"
3	Peter Sagan (SVK)	Tinkoff	+ 8"
4	Bob Jungels (LUX)	Etixx–Quick-Step	+ 21"
5	Gianluca Brambilla (ITA)	Etixx–Quick-Step	+ 21"
6	Thibaut Pinot (FRA)	FDJ	+ 28"
7	Sébastien Reichenbach (SUI)	FDJ	+ 28"
8	Roman Kreuziger (CZE)	Tinkoff	+ 30"
9	Michał Kwiatkowski (POL)	Team Sky	+ 31"
10	Vincenzo Nibali (ITA)	Astana	+ 34"

=== Stage 7 ===
15 March 2016 — San Benedetto del Tronto, 10.1 km (6.3 mi)

Stage 7 Result

	Rider	Team	Time
1	Fabian Cancellara (SUI)	Trek–Segafredo	11' 08"
2	Johan Le Bon (FRA)	FDJ	+ 13"
3	Tony Martin (GER)	Etixx–Quick-Step	+ 15"
4	Alex Dowsett (GBR)	Movistar Team	+ 15"
5	Maciej Bodnar (POL)	Tinkoff	+ 17"
6	Alexandre Geniez (FRA)	FDJ	+ 18"
7	Edvald Boasson Hagen (NOR)	Team Dimension Data	+ 19"
8	Vasil Kiryienka (BLR)	Team Sky	+ 20"
9	Damiano Caruso (ITA)	BMC Racing Team	+ 22"
10	Peter Sagan (SVK)	Tinkoff	+ 24"

Final General Classification

	Rider	Team	Time
1	Greg Van Avermaet (BEL)	BMC Racing Team	20h 42' 22"
2	Peter Sagan (SVK)	Tinkoff	+ 1"
3	Bob Jungels (LUX)	Etixx–Quick-Step	+ 23"
4	Sébastien Reichenbach (SUI)	FDJ	+ 24"
5	Thibaut Pinot (FRA)	FDJ	+ 24"
6	Vincenzo Nibali (ITA)	Astana	+ 29"
7	Zdenek Štybar (CZE)	Etixx–Quick-Step	+ 33"
8	Michał Kwiatkowski (POL)	Team Sky	+ 39"
9	Bauke Mollema (NED)	Trek–Segafredo	+ 45"
10	Roman Kreuziger (CZE)	Tinkoff	+ 48"

== Classification leadership table ==
Stage	Winner	General classification	Points classification	Mountains classification	Young rider classification	Teams classification
1	BMC Racing Team	Daniel Oss	not awarded	not awarded	Yves Lampaert	BMC Racing Team
2	Zdeněk Štybar	Zdeněk Štybar	Zdeněk Štybar	Zdeněk Štybar	Bob Jungels	BMC Racing Team
3	Fernando Gaviria	Zdeněk Štybar	Peter Sagan	Zdeněk Štybar	Bob Jungels	BMC Racing Team
4	Steve Cummings	Zdeněk Štybar	Peter Sagan	Cesare Benedetti	Bob Jungels	BMC Racing Team
5	stage cancelled	Zdeněk Štybar	Peter Sagan	Cesare Benedetti	Bob Jungels	BMC Racing Team
6	Greg Van Avermaet	Greg Van Avermaet	Peter Sagan	Cesare Benedetti	Bob Jungels	Etixx–Quick-Step
7	Fabian Cancellara	Greg Van Avermaet	Peter Sagan	Cesare Benedetti	Bob Jungels	Etixx–Quick-Step
Final		Greg Van Avermaet	Peter Sagan	Cesare Benedetti	Bob Jungels	Etixx–Quick-Step
