= Vicino =

Vicino may refer to:

- Bruno Vicino (born 1952), Italian cyclist
- Giuseppe Vicino (born 1993), Italian rower
- Vicino da Ferrara (1432–1509), Italian painter
- Poggio San Vicino, Italian comune
- Monte San Vicino, a mountain in Italy
