= Lake della Duchessa =

Glacial alpine lake in Lazio, Italy

Duchessa Lake
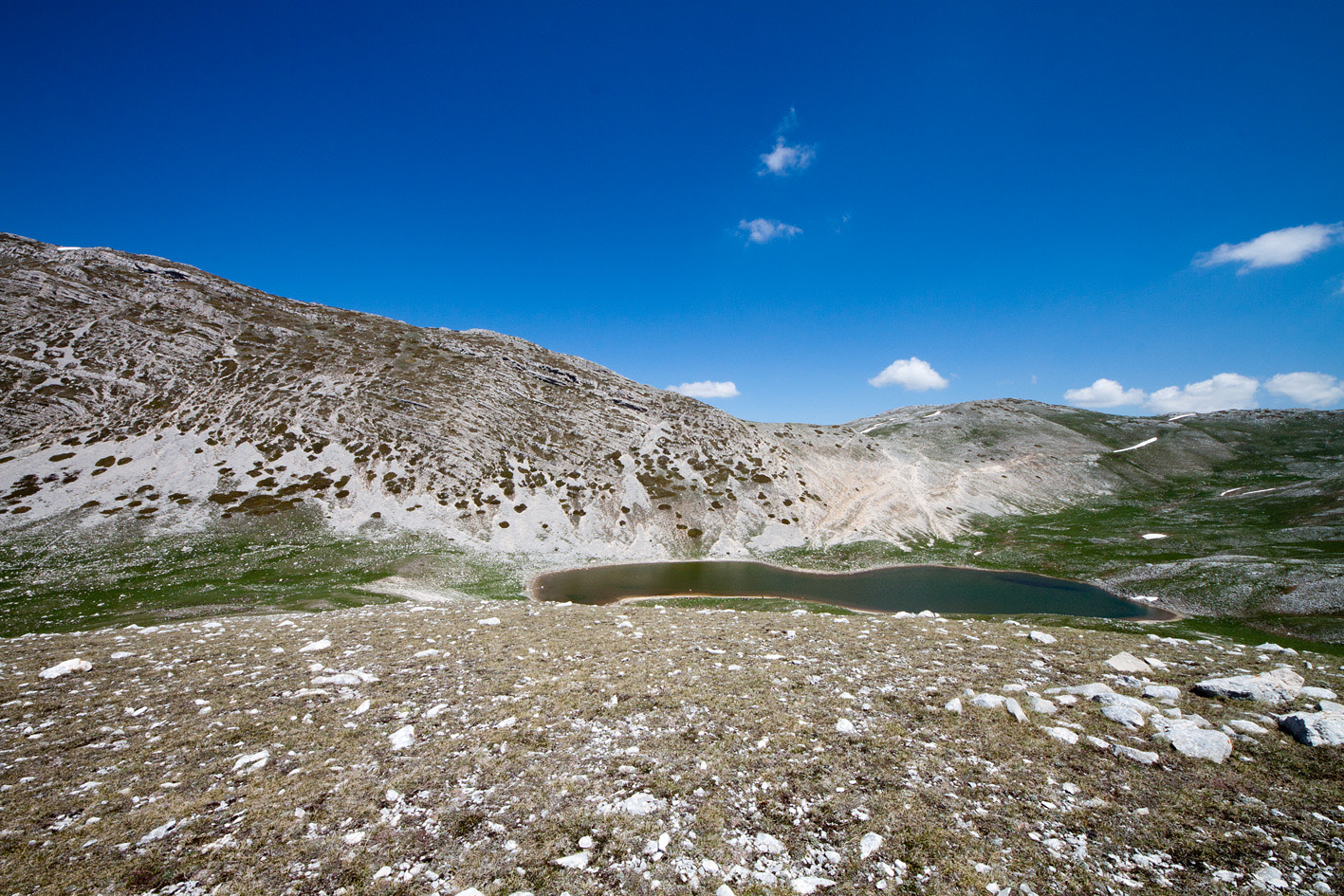
- View of the lake from its basin (on the left Monte Morrone, in the foreground Murolungo)

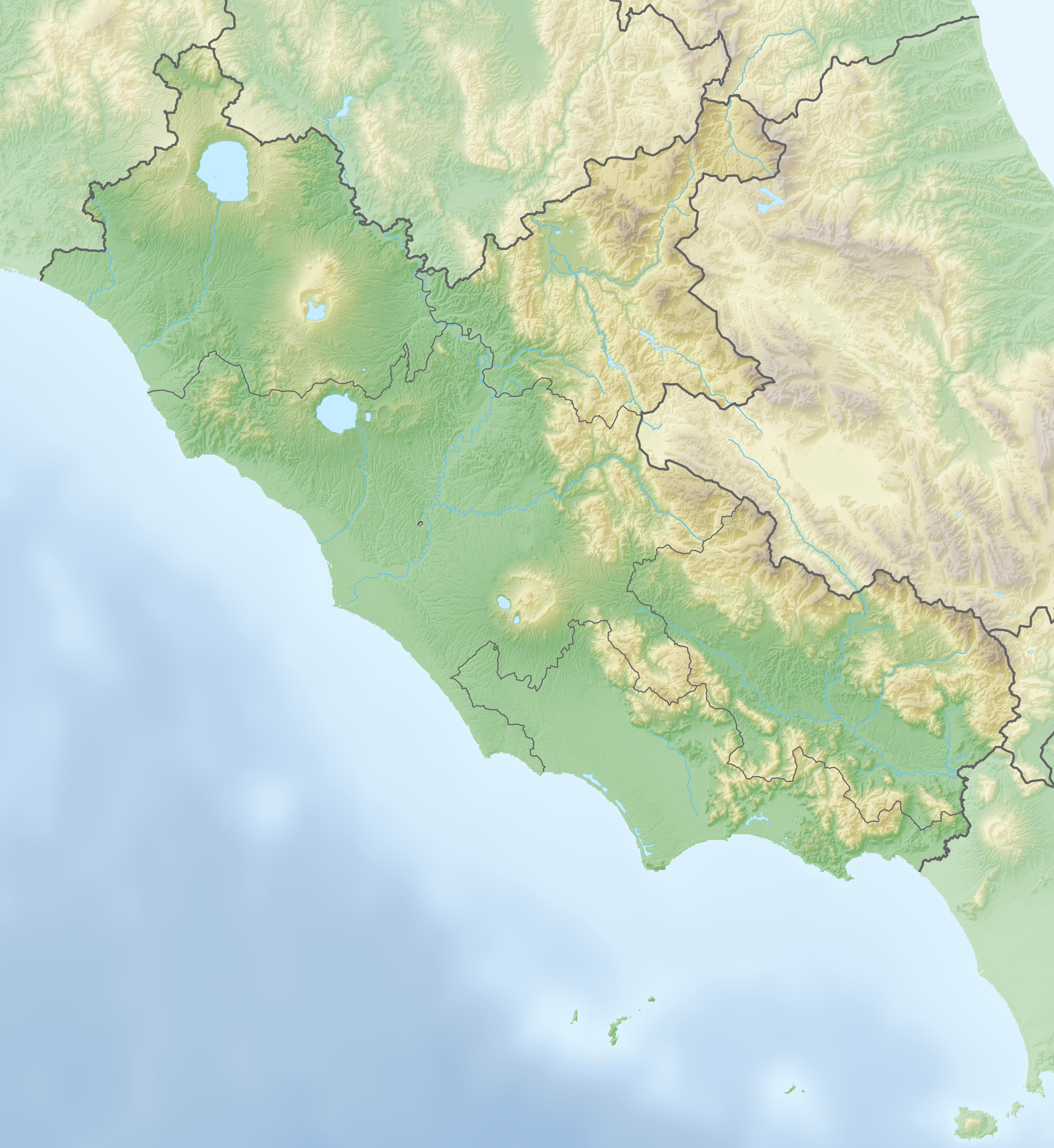
- Location within Lazio
- Location: Italy
- Coordinates: 42°11′15″N 13°20′52″E
- Type: Glacial
- Basin countries: Italy
- Max. length: 0.4 km (0.25 mi)
- Max. width: 0.15 km (0.093 mi)
- Surface elevation: 1,788 m (5,866 ft)
- Settlements: Borgorose

The Duchessa Lake is a high-altitude mountain lake in Lazio, in the Province of Rieti, within the Montagne della Duchessa Regional Reserve, in the territory of the municipality of Borgorose, on the border with the Province of L'Aquila in Abruzzo.

== Description ==
It is a glacial lake of alpine type, one of the few in the Apennines, located at 1,788 m a.s.l. in a high-altitude basin between the rocky walls of Murolungo (2,184 m) and the slopes of Monte Morrone (2,141 m) and the Costone-Uccettu subgroup (2,239–2,004 m) in a grassy area that in summer is covered with ranunculuses and serves as a refuge for the crested newt.

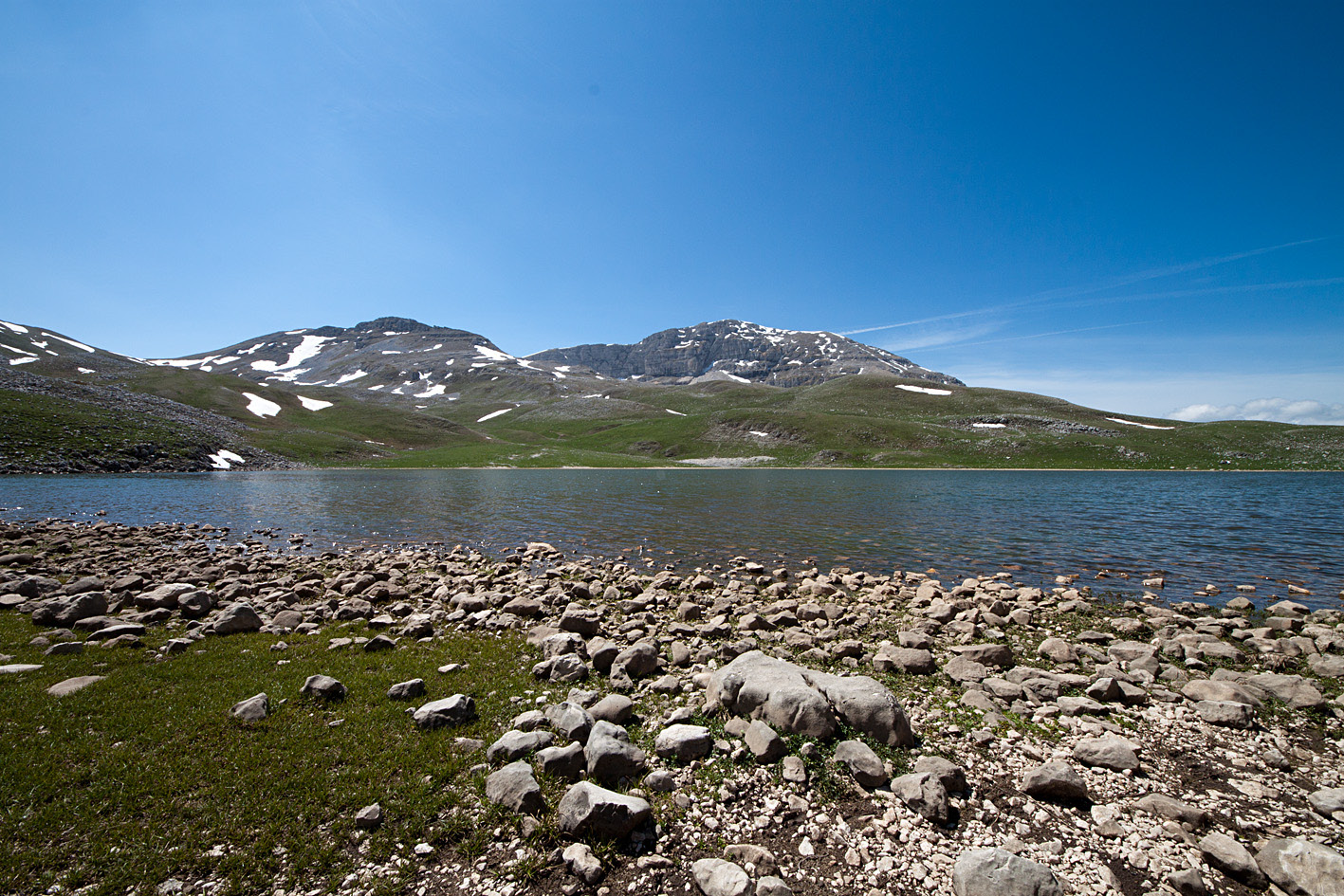
The lake in late spring (in the background Murolungo)

The lake, lacking inflows, 400 m long and 150 m wide, is a typical high-altitude mountain lake of glacial origin, showing seasonal level variations as it is fed solely by atmospheric precipitation and the melting of snow. Its shape suggests an ancient merger of two dolines.

=== Access ===
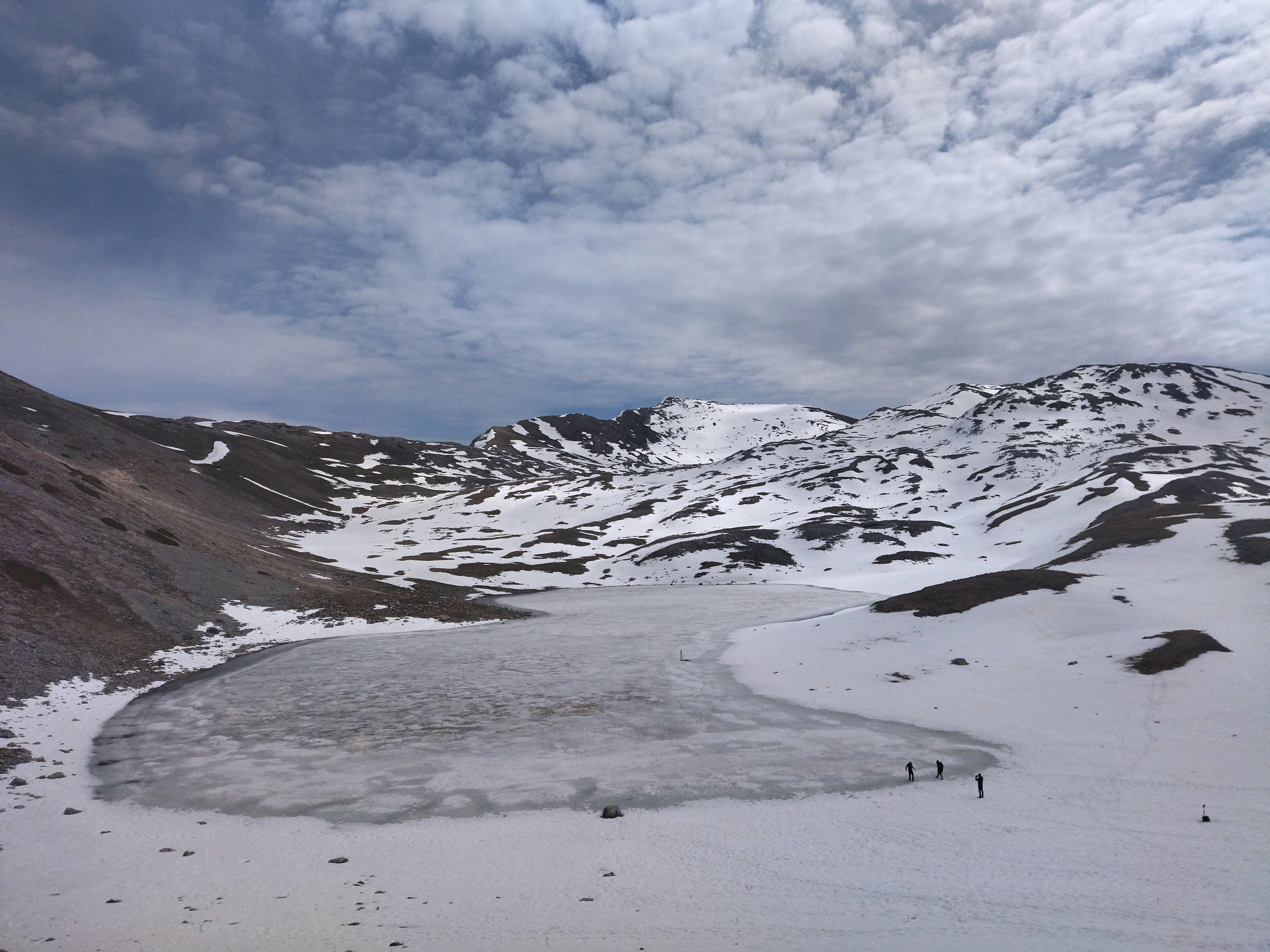
The frozen lake

The lake can be reached from the western side of Cartore in Borgorose through medium-length and elevation hiking trails, via the Vallone di Fua or Vallone del Cieco, or from Corvaro by ascending Valle Amara, Valle dell'Asino, up to Campitello, then crossing between Punta dell'Uccettu and Monte Morrone with a subsequent short descent. From the eastern side, it can be accessed from Prato Capito on the road to Campo Felice by crossing the Bosco di Cerasuolo, reaching Campitello, and joining the other route, or from the Rifugio Vincenzo Sebastiani by climbing Vena Stellante (2,271 m) and then descending gradually.

Slope	Starting Point	Trail	Difficulty	Refuge/Bivouac	Notes
West	Cartore	CAI 2B	EE	Bivouac Gigi Panei	Exposed passages
West	Cartore	CAI 2C up to Gigi Panei bivouac, final stretch CAI 2B to the lake	E		
West	Bocca di Teve	CAI 2 (up to Capo Teve), CAI 2A (up to Malopasso), CAI 1A (up to the lake)	EE		Exposed passages on CAI 2A
East	Valle Cerchiata	CAI 1A	EE	Rifugio Vincenzo Sebastiani	
East	Old bauxite mine	CAI 1E (up to Il Costone), CAI 1A (up to the lake)	EE		
North	Tornimparte	CAI 1E, CAI 1F, CAI 2E, Punta dell'Uccettu, Duchessa Lake	EE		
North	Corvaro	CAI 2D	EE		

== History ==
=== The lake and the Moro case ===
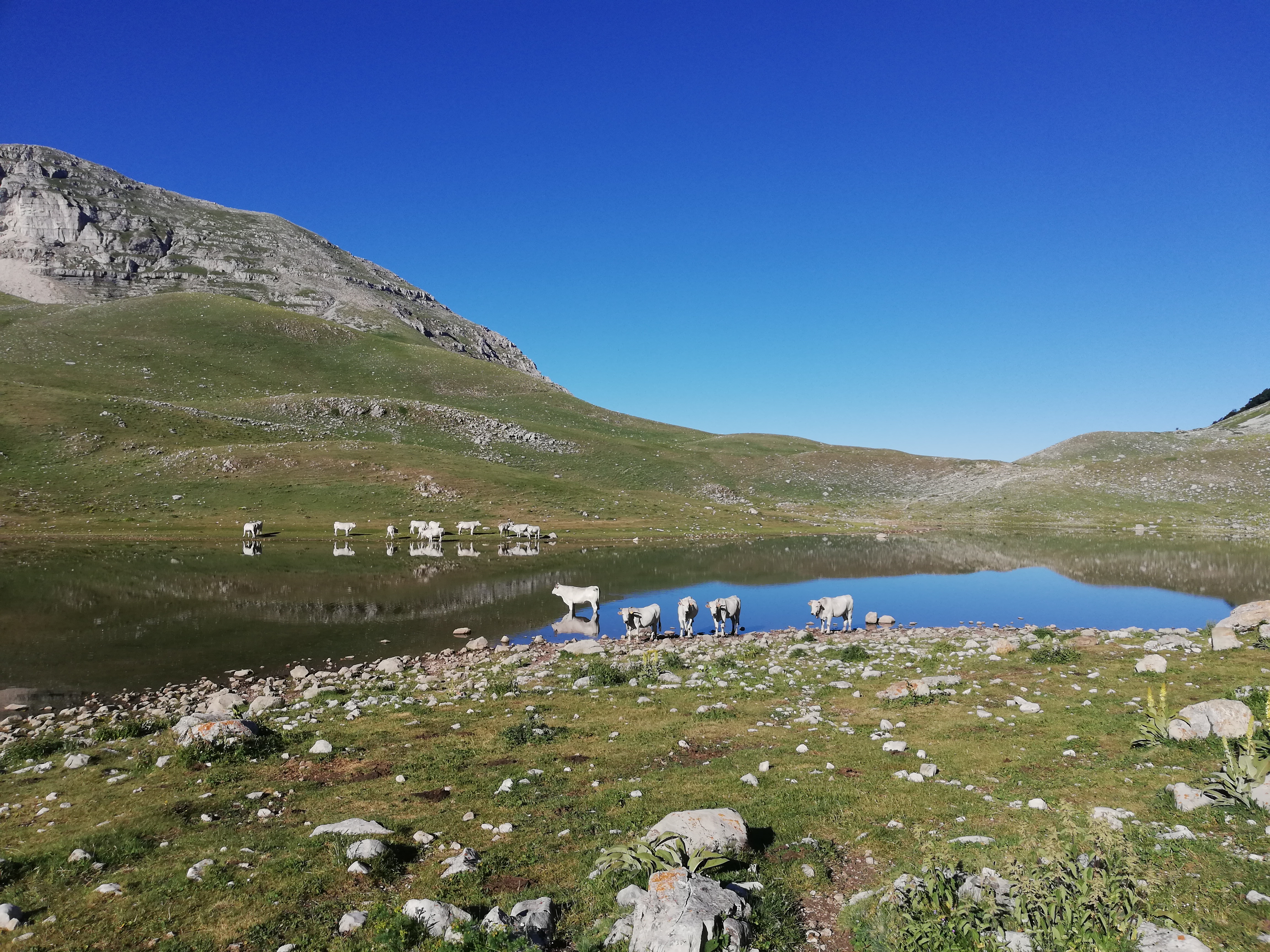
The lake with herds drinking. On the left, Murolungo

The lake gained national notoriety due to a disinformation attempt in April 1978 during the kidnapping of Aldo Moro. A false Red Brigades communiqué (false communiqué no. 7) on 18 April 1978 indicated that Moro's body should be searched for in the lake, forcing the police to conduct challenging search operations under the frozen surface. When the false Red Brigades communiqué about Duchessa Lake arrived,

general rehearsal for Moro's assassination, not only did Berlinguer believe in its authenticity, but the Ministry of the Interior confirmed it. Berlinguer and Chiaromonte then went to Andreotti, Galloni, and Salvi, who thought Moro was already dead.

On the same day, the Red Brigades hideout in via Gradoli, 96 in Rome was discovered.

Within a week, the international press raised doubts about its authenticity:

The Canard Enchaîné did not hesitate to assert confidently that the Duchessa Lake affair (i.e., the rumor circulated at a certain point about the presence of Moro's body in that remote location, with the consequent massive police operation) was nothing but a setup by anti-terrorism specialists, who, faced with an untenable stalemate, wanted to induce the terrorists to break their silence and show themselves to public opinion in full action. It was a scheme whose authorship was variously attributed to circles linked to the Prime Minister or the Minister of the Interior at the time.

The false message had indeed been claimed by multiple parties, but the issuance of the new communiqué no. 7 three days later led to suspicions of its apocryphal nature; it was likely produced by the art forger Antonio Chichiarelli, linked to the Banda della Magliana.

== See also ==
- Lazio
- Province of Rieti
- Borgorose
