= Jacopo Surricchio =

Italian footballer (born 2006)

Personal information
- Date of birth: 17 January 2006 (age 20)
- Place of birth: Sambuceto, Italy
- Height: 1.82 m (6 ft 0 in)
- Position: Midfielder

Team information
- Current team: Roma (youth)

Youth career
- Giovanile Chieti
- Chieti
- –2022: Teramo
- 2022: → Roma (loan)
- 2022–: Roma

Senior career*
Years	Team	Apps	(Gls)
2021	Teramo	2	(0)
- * Club domestic league appearances and goals as of 18:59, 6 January 2022 (UTC)

Jacopo Surricchio (born 17 January 2006) is an Italian professional footballer who plays as a midfielder for the youth sector of Serie A club Roma.

== Career ==
=== Early career ===
Born in Sambuceto, in the Province of Chieti, Italy, Surricchio began playing football aged four-and-a-half at Giovanile Chieti, before joining Chieti and Teramo's youth teams. On 11 March 2021, he made his Campionato Primavera 3 (under-19) debut for Teramo, aged 15.

On 23 October 2021, Surricchio made his professional debut aged 15 years, 279 days, as an 83rd-minute substitute in a 4–0 Serie C defeat to Cesena.

=== Roma ===
On 18 January 2022, he transferred to Serie A club Roma on loan, and was assigned to their under-17 squad. Following the loan expiry in summer of 2022, Surricchio was permanently signed by Roma on a free transfer as Teramo were excluded from the upcoming 2022–23 Serie C championship, and all their players were subsequently released.
