= Penna Sant'Andrea =

- Comune
- Comune di Penna Sant'Andrea
- Location within Italy Location within Abruzzo
- Coordinates: 42°36′N 13°46′E
- Country: Italy
- Region: Abruzzo
- Province: Teramo (TE)
- Frazioni: Capsano, Pilone, Val Vomano

Government
  - Mayor: Severino Serrani

Area
  - Total: 11 km^{2} (4.2 sq mi)
- Elevation: 413 m (1,355 ft)

Population (30 November 2014)
  - Total: 1,726
  - Density: 160/km^{2} (410/sq mi)
- Demonym: Pennesi
- Time zone: UTC+1 (CET)
  - Summer (DST): UTC+2 (CEST)
- Postal code: 64039
- Dialing code: 0861
- ISTAT code: 067033
- Website: Official website

Penna Sant'Andrea (Abruzzese: La Pònnë) is a town and comune in the province of Teramo in the Abruzzo region of south-eastern Italy.
