= Autostrada A25 (Italy) =

Controlled-access highway in Italy

Autostrada A25
- Strada dei Parchi; Parks motorway

Route information
- Part of E80
- Maintained by ANAS
- Length: 114 km (71 mi)
- Existed: 1969–present

Major junctions
- West end: Torano
- A24 in Torano; A14 in Pescara
- East end: Pescara

Location
- Country: Italy
- Regions: Abruzzo

Highway system
- Roads in Italy; Autostrade; State; Regional; Provincial; Municipal
← A 24	→ A 26

The Autostrada A25 or Strada dei Parchi ("Parks Motorway") is an autostrada (Italian for "motorway") 114 kilometres (71 mi) long in Italy mostly located in the region of Abruzzo connecting the Torano interchange (where it splits from the Autostrada A24) to Pescara and Autostrada A14, in the Adriatic coast. The A25 takes its name "Parks Motorway" from the Maiella National Park, the Abruzzo, Lazio and Molise National Park and the Gran Sasso e Monti della Laga National Park, all served and connected to the national motorway system by it. It is part of the E80 European route.

The A25 splits from the A24 at the border with the region of Lazio at the Svincolo direzionale Torano (Torano interchange). It then crosses the Fucine Plain and the Marsica through the Abruzzese Apennines up to the valley of the river Pescara, where at the Adriatic Coast finally merges into Autostrada A14 near Pescara. The A25 is 114 kilometres (71 mi) long with two service stations near each end about 80 kilometres (50 mi) apart. Together with Autostrada A24 the motorway is currently managed by the private company Strada dei Parchi S.p.A.

== Route ==
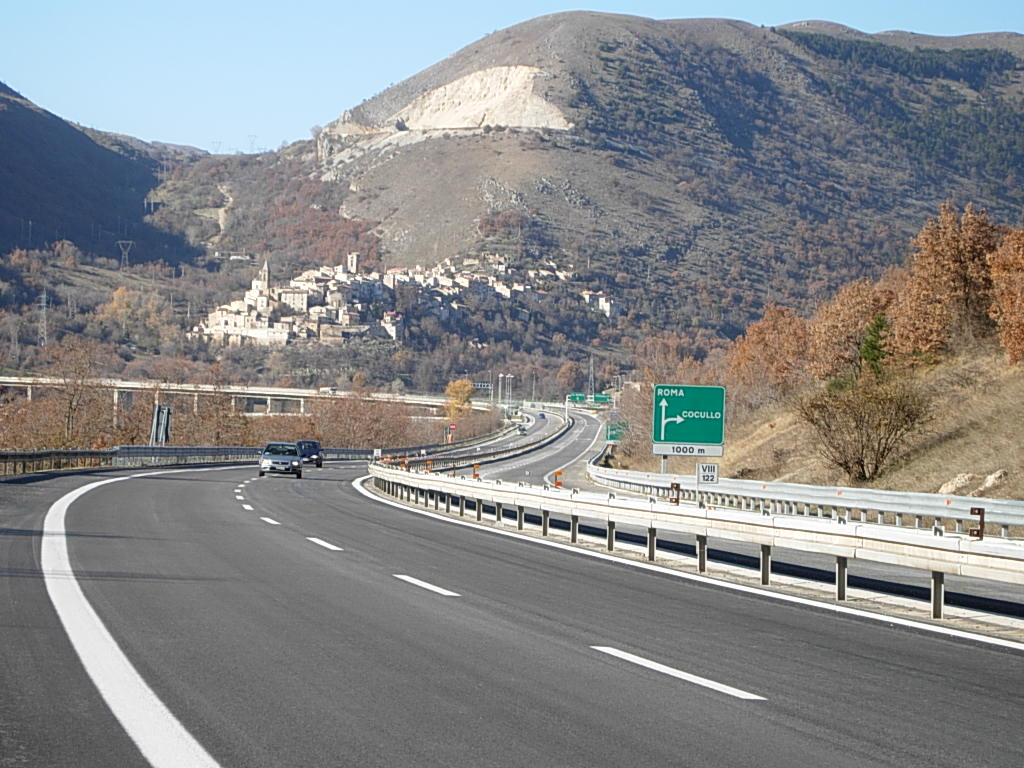
Autostrada A25 near Cocullo

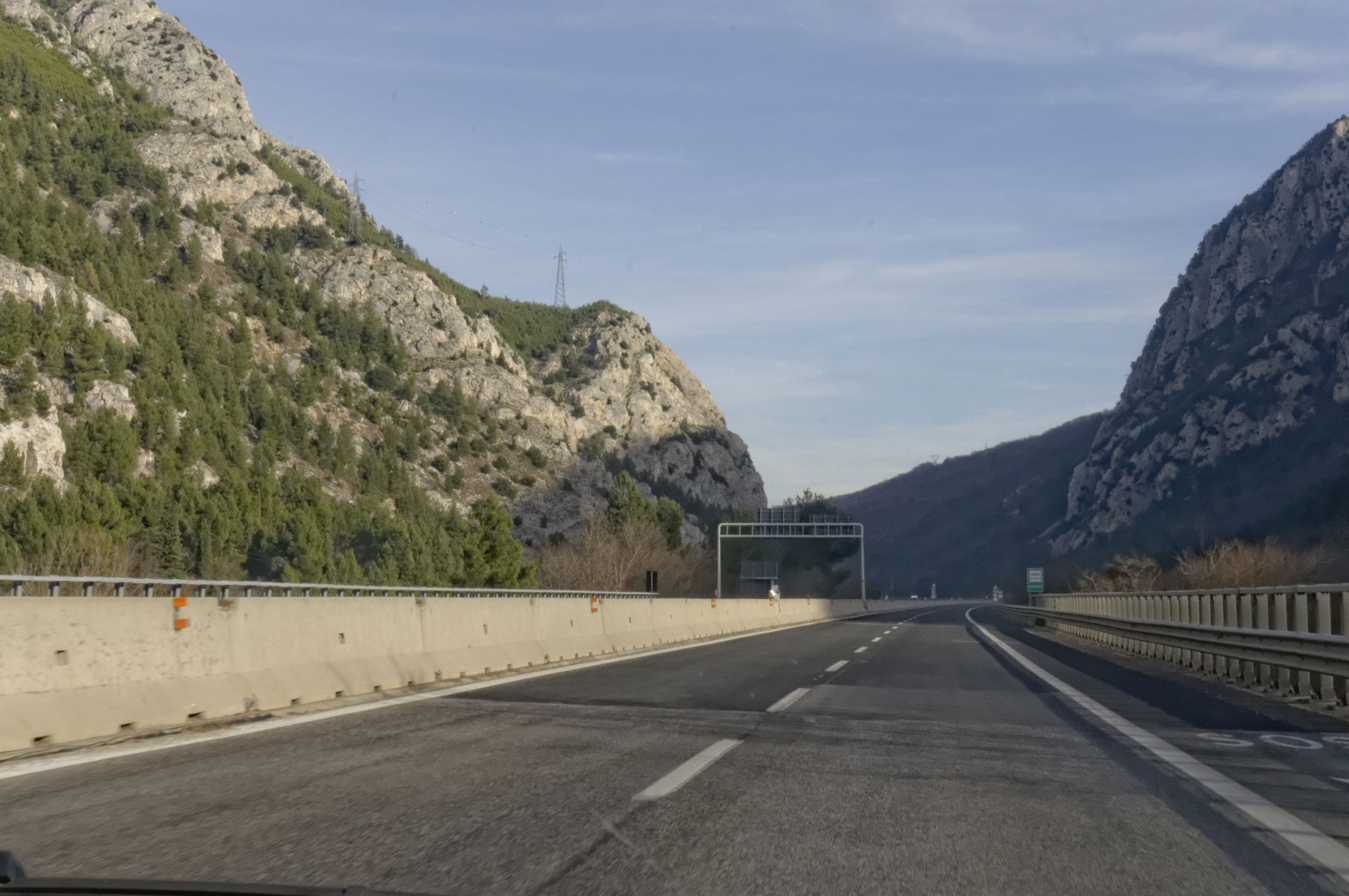
Autostrada A25 near Popoli Terme

TORANO - PESCARA; Strada dei Parchi
Exit	↓km↓	↑km↑	Province	European Road
Roma - L'Aquila - Teramo; Gran Sasso e Monti della Laga National Park	0 km (0 mi)	114 km (71 mi)	AQ	E80
Rest area "Monte Velino"	10 km (6.2 mi)	104 km (65 mi)	AQ	E80
Magliano de' Marsi	11 km (6.8 mi)	103 km (64 mi)	AQ	E80
Avezzano	16 km (9.9 mi)	98 km (61 mi)	AQ	E80
Aielli - Celano; Ovindoli; Abruzzo, Lazio and Molise National Park	29 km (18 mi)	85 km (53 mi)	AQ	E80
Pescina; Abruzzo, Lazio and Molise National Park	37 km (23 mi)	77 km (48 mi)	AQ	E80
Cocullo	48 km (30 mi)	66 km (41 mi)	AQ	E80
Pratola Peligna - Sulmona; Maiella National Park	64 km (40 mi)	50 km (31 mi)	AQ	E80
Bussi - Popoli	77 km (48 mi)	37 km (23 mi)	PE	E80
Tocco da Casauria - Torre de' Passeri	84 km (52 mi)	30 km (19 mi)	PE	E80
Scafa - Alanno	93 km (58 mi)	21 km (13 mi)	PE	E80
Rest area "Brecciarola"	102 km (63 mi)	12 km (7.5 mi)	CH	E80
Chieti; RA12 Pescara	104 km (65 mi)	10 km (6.2 mi)	CH	E80
Villanova	113 km (70 mi)	1 km (0.62 mi)	PE	E80
Bologna - Taranto	114 km (71 mi)	0 km (0 mi)	PE	E80

== See also ==
- Autostrade of Italy
- Roads in Italy
- Transport in Italy
- A24

=== Other Italian roads ===
- State highways (Italy)
- Regional road (Italy)
- Provincial road (Italy)
- Municipal road (Italy)
