= Traforo del Gran Sasso =

Road tunnel in Italy

Gran Sasso Tunnel Traforo del Gran Sasso
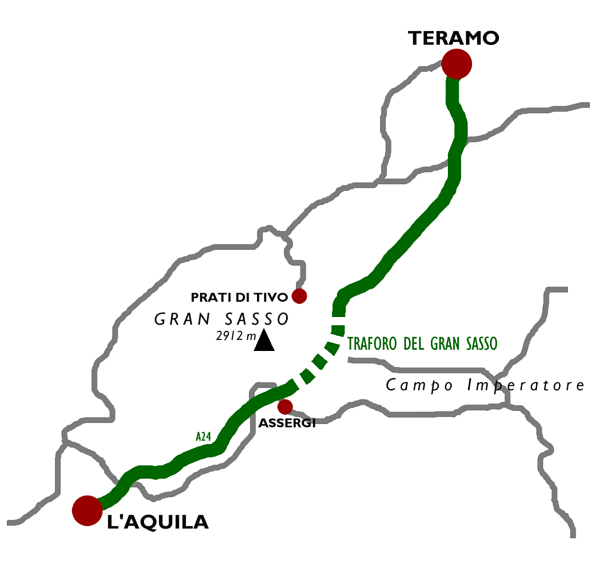
- Interactive map of Gran Sasso Tunnel; Traforo del Gran Sasso

Overview
- Coordinates: 42°25′03″N 13°31′23″E
- Start: Assergi
- End: Casale San Nicola

Operation
- Work began: November 14, 1968
- Opened: December 1, 1984

The Gran Sasso Tunnel is part of the A24 Motorway in Italy that links Rome and the Adriatic Sea via L'Aquila and Teramo, through the Apennine Mountains via the Gran Sasso in Abruzzo.

There are two tunnels, each with two lanes for each direction, 10,176 metres long. Construction started on November 14, 1968. The eastbound tunnel (to Teramo) opened on December 1, 1984 while the westbound tunnel (to L'Aquila) opened in 1993. Costs for the entire project amounted to approximately 1,700 billion Italian liras (nearly €890 million) - instead of the initially foreseen 80 billion Italian liras, due to unforeseen circumstances.

The tunnels host the Laboratori Nazionali del Gran Sasso, the largest underground research center in the world. This underground laboratories are used by the INFN (Istituto Nazionale di Fisica Nucleare - National Nuclear Physics Laboratory) for experiments that require a low background environment in the fields of astroparticle physics and nuclear astrophysics. Construction works started in 1982 and ended in 1987. These labs are located approximately 1,400 metres under the Gran Sasso massif, protecting the experiments from cosmic rays.

It is the third longest road tunnel in Italy, after the Fréjus and Monte Bianco tunnels, and the longest road tunnel entirely on Italian territory. At the time, it was Europe’s longest double-barrel tunnel, ranking twelfth in the world. As of 2025, it's Europe’s second longest double-barrel road tunnel after the Ryfylke Tunnel, ranking 33rd in the world. (Note: See List of longest road tunnels)

The highway over the mountain, which now sees little traffic, has been renamed the Grand Highway of the Gran Sasso and Monti della Laga National Park to highlight its status as a scenic route.
