= Villa Petto =

Village in Abruzzo, Italy

- Frazione
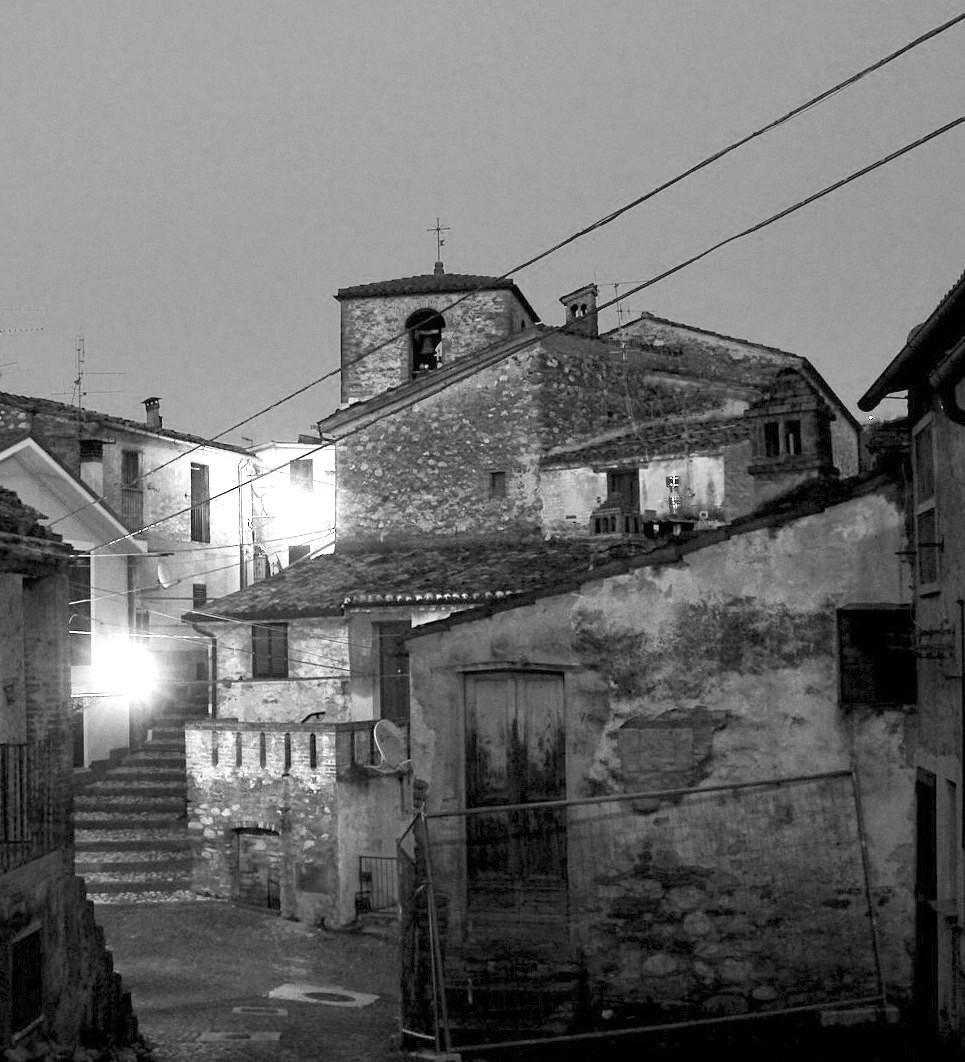
- Villa Petto, Colledara, Abruzzo, Italy

- Location of Villa Petto in Italy
- Country: Italy
- Region: Abruzzo
- Province: Teramo
- Comune: Colledara
- Elevation: 450 m (1,480 ft)

Population
  - Total: 261
- Time zone: UTC+1 (CET)
  - Summer (DST): UTC+2 (CEST)
- Postal code: 64042

Villa Petto, also known as Castel Petto, is an Italian village in the municipality of Colledara (It.: “frazione”), a municipality located in the territory of the Province of Teramo, in the Abruzzo region. It is located 450 meters above sea level, on the slopes of Mount Cicembro. It is 20 km from Teramo, the provincial capital.

The most important architectural element of its historic center is the Church of Santa Lucia. The place of worship was built on the remains of the castle walls that dominated the town. It was probably founded during the 14th-15th centuries. The ruins of the 14th-century church of San Salvatore, very close to the church of Santa Lucia, are still recognizable.

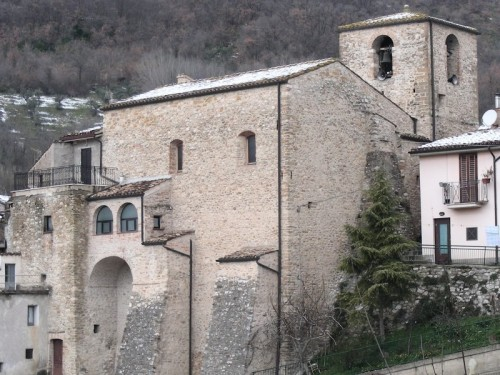
Church of Santa Lucia, Villa Petto, Italy

Castel Petto does not seem to have been mentioned before the Swabian period (late 13th century). In the Angevin era it was part of the Valle Siciliana area (of Abruzzo), already under the Orsini family since the 14th century. In 1526 the domain of the area passed from the Orsini to the Alarcón-Mendoza. At the end of the 18th century, until 1807, it constituted an autonomous Universitas. After a brief period under the jurisdiction of Tossicia, in 1811 it definitively became a district of Colledara.

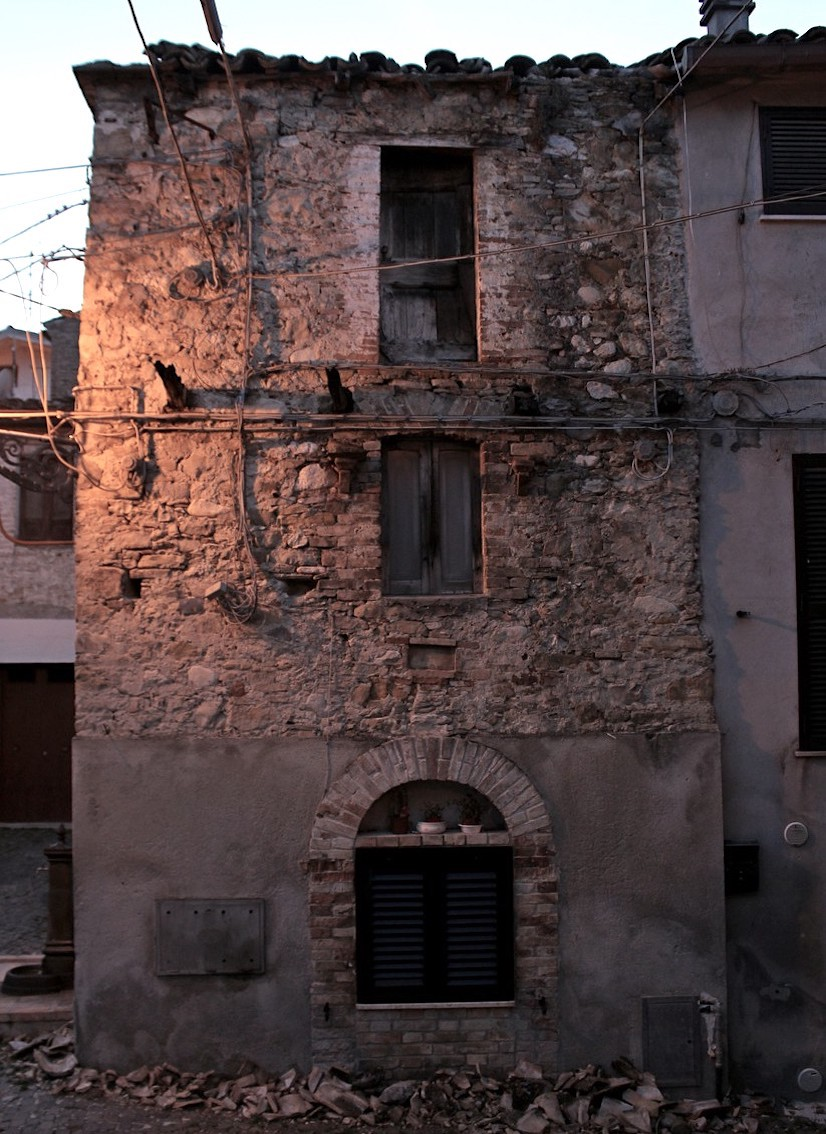
Villa Petto, Colledara, Abruzzo, Italy

Between 1338 and the end of the 19th century it was a fief of the Isca, Sterlich, Torres and Scorpioni families. Even in a shared manner, from the beginning of the 19th century until the abolition of feudalism in the Kingdom of Naples in 1806, Sterlich, Torres and Scorpioni (mentioned above), the Castiglioni, Coletti and the Scaricamazza family were the holders of the barony of Castel Petto. With the unification of Italy, the town witnessed the revolts of the Bourbon bandits, the “briganti”, which broke out against the new kingdom of the House of Savoy.

Small semi-detached houses characterize the Villa Petto; the great noble palaces, which often identify nearby towns, seem to be absent.

On Good Friday, Villa Petto hosts a singular procession of the dead Christ in which the presence of women predominates: with a tense voice they sing the painful drama of the Passion and with firm postures they transmit and embody before the whole community the pain of the women who they accompanied Christ on his way to Calvary.

The town, also due to the earthquakes that have affected the region, is suffering a gradual and continuous depopulation.
