= San Giovanni in Leopardis =

Church near Borgorose, Italy

San Giovanni in Leopardis is a former Roman Catholic church and Benedictine church located in a hilltop south of the town of Borgorose, in the province of Rieti, region of Lazio, Italy. Only ruined and stripped elements of the Romanesque church walls and former crypt remain.

Once attached to a Benedictine abbley, linked to the Abbey of Montecassino, the site is first mentioned in 1153 in a papal bull by Anastasius IV. Putatively built using elements at the site of an Ancient Roman temple dedicated to Diana. The layout of the church was that of a Latin cross with the crypt likely located below a semicircular apse and presbytery. The building was refurbished in 990 after a severe earthquake. In 1231, the church was dependant of the abbey of San Pietro in Ferentillo. But parish functions were transferred since the 15th century to the church of Santa Caterina, later named Sant'Anastasia, at Borgorose. Over the centuries, the church became less used and in 1651 the Bishop of Rieti ordered that mass be held regularly. In 1745, the portal and rose-window of the church at this site was taken to refurbish the church of San Anastasia, and this site fell to ruin. The remaining crypt was semicircular and graced with well-conserved carved Romanesque capitals. In 1984, three years after a restoration by the Comune of Borgorose, vandals stole many of the capitals, causing partial collapse of the structure.

In 2018, Italian authorities recuperated two of the capitals from an Umbrian antique vendor, and they are displayed by the Museo Archeologico Cicolano in Corvaro.
