= Antipope Nicholas V =

13/14th-century Italian preacher; claimant to the papacy from 1328 to 1330

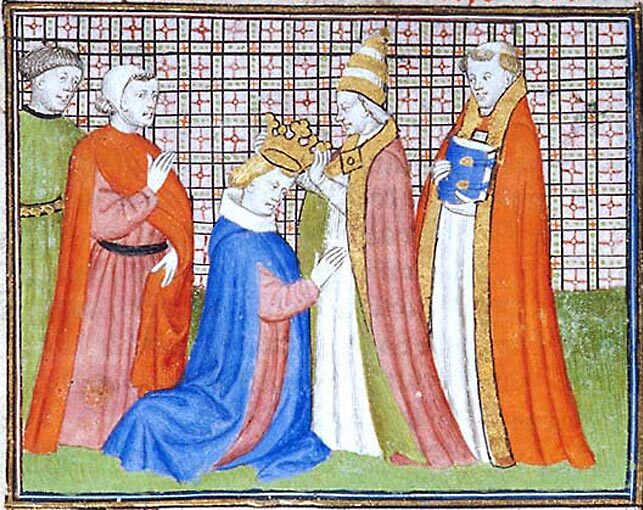
- Antipope Nicholas V crowns Louis IV the Bavarian; 12 May 1328
- Elected: 12 May 1328
- Papacy began: 12 May 1328
- Papacy ended: 25 July 1330
- Opposed to: Pope John XXII

Orders
- Consecration: 12 May 1328 by the then-Bishop of Venice

Personal details
- Born: Pietro Rainalducci c. 1258 Corvaro, Lazio, Italy
- Died: 16 October 1333 Palais des Papes, Avignon, France

Nicholas V, born Pietro Rainalducci (c. 1258 – 16 October 1333) was an antipope in Italy from 12 May 1328 to 25 July 1330 during the pontificate of Pope John XXII (1316–1334) at Avignon. He was the last antipope set up by a Holy Roman Emperor.

Rainalducci was born at Corvaro, an ancient stronghold near Rieti in Lazio. He joined the Franciscan order after separating from his wife in 1310, and became famous as a preacher.

He was elected through the influence of the excommunicated Holy Roman Emperor, Louis the Bavarian, by an assembly of priests and laymen, and consecrated at Old St. Peter's Basilica, Rome, on 12 May 1328 by the bishop of Venice.

Nicholas V in Hell, from the Camposanto Monumentale di Pisa

After spending four months in Rome, he withdrew with Louis IV to Viterbo, but in December 1328 the papal legate Cardinal Orsini began a campaign against Viterbo and Corneto. Nicholas moved on to Grosseto and then to Pisa, where he was guarded by the imperial vicar. On 19 February 1329, Nicholas V presided at a ceremony in the Duomo of Pisa, at which a straw puppet representing Pope John XXII and dressed in pontifical robes was formally condemned, degraded, and handed over to the secular arm (to be "executed").

Nicholas V was excommunicated by Pope John XXII in April 1329, and sought refuge with Count Boniface of Donoratico near Piombino. Having obtained assurance of pardon, he presented a confession of his sins first to the archbishop of Pisa, and then at Avignon on 25 August 1330, to John XXII, who absolved him.

He remained in honourable imprisonment in the papal palace, Avignon until his death in October 1333. Despite this reconciliation, memories of him were highly negative in the later 1330s. In a monumental fresco by Buonamico Buffalmacco in the Camposanto Monumentale di Pisa, Nicholas V is depicted in Hell being dismembered and eaten by demons. The inscription describes him as a "friend of Muhammad", who is shown being tortured at his feet.
