= Pié La Costa =

Coordinates: 42°19′07″N 13°16′21″E

- Frazione
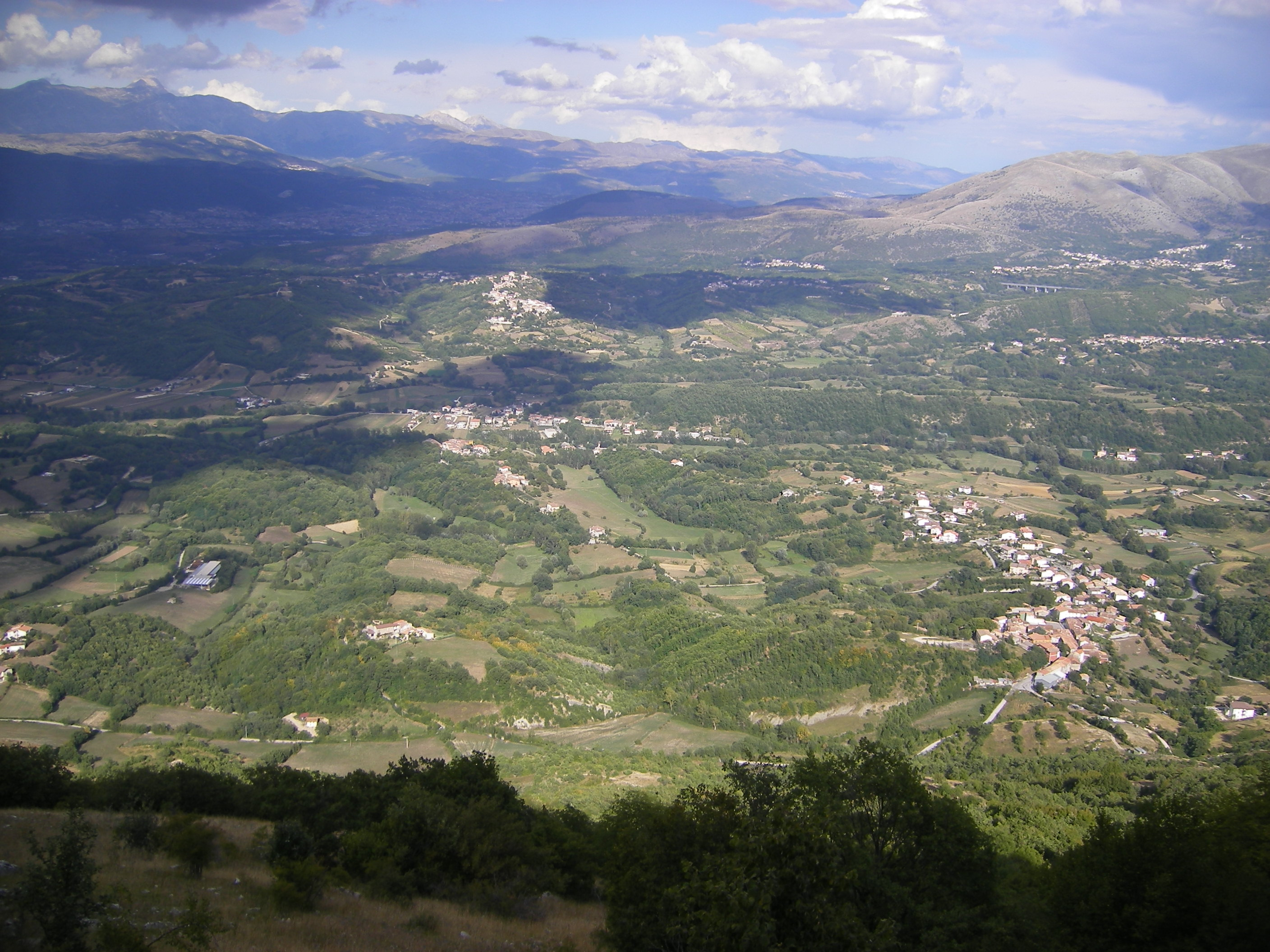
- Interactive map of Pié La Costa
- Country: Italy
- Region: Abruzzo
- Province: L'Aquila
- Commune: Tornimparte
- Time zone: UTC+1 (CET)
  - Summer (DST): UTC+2 (CEST)

Pié La Costa is a frazione of Tornimparte, in the Province of L'Aquila in the Abruzzo, region of Italy.

Amongst the sites of interest is Chiesa di San Tommasso (church of St. Thomas).
