= Colledara =

- Comune
- Comune di Colledara
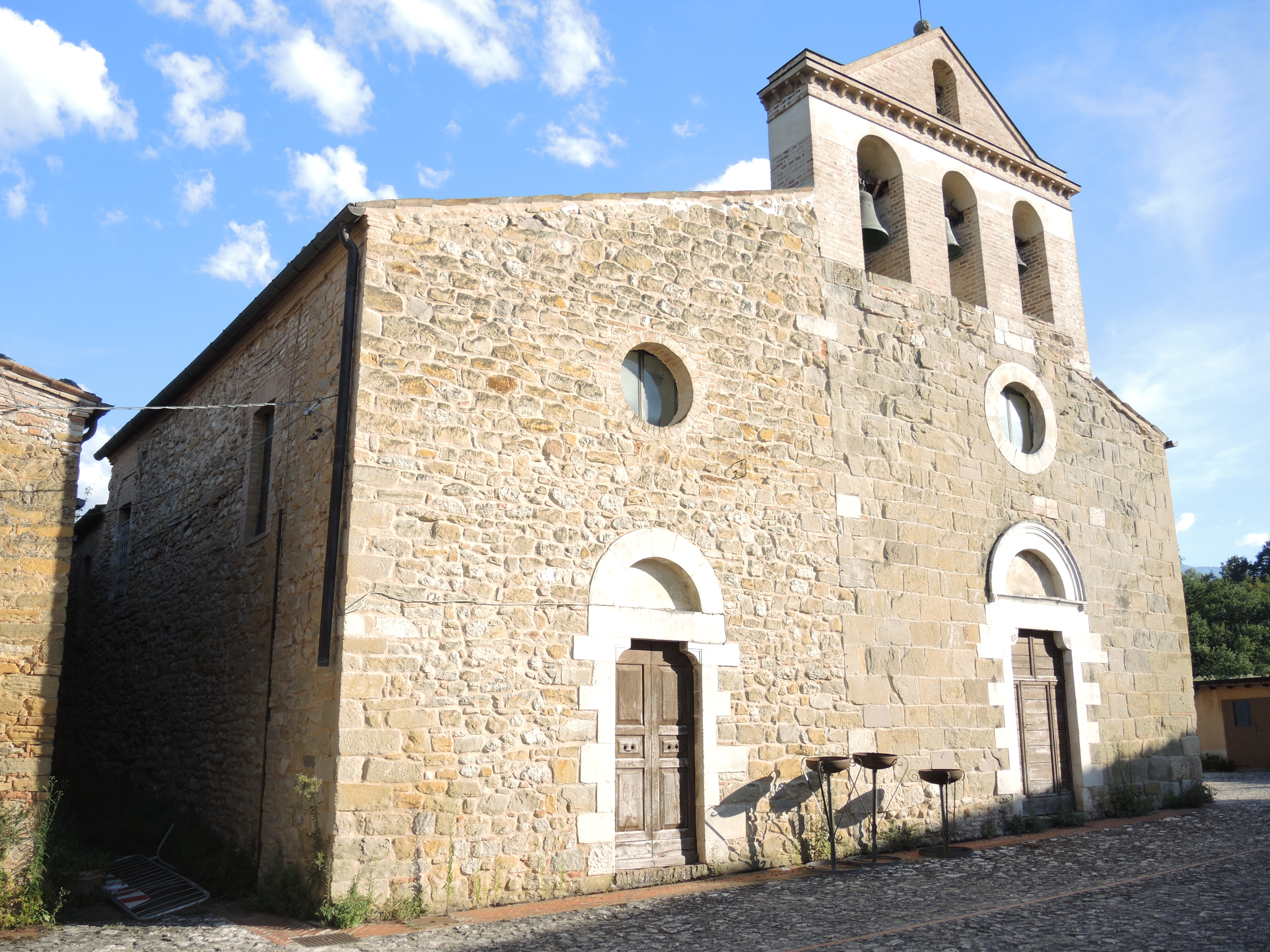

- Location within Italy Location within Abruzzo
- Coordinates: 42°32′N 13°41′E
- Country: Italy
- Region: Abruzzo
- Province: Teramo (TE)
- Frazioni: Bascianella, Capo di Colle, Castiglione della Valle, Chiovano, Collecastino, Villa Ilii, Ornano Grande, Ornano Piccolo, Pantani, Pizzicato, Sbarra, Vico, Villapetto

Area
  - Total: 19.86 km^{2} (7.67 sq mi)
- Elevation: 430 m (1,410 ft)

Population (2007)
  - Total: 2,250
  - Density: 113/km^{2} (293/sq mi)
- Demonym: Colledaresi
- Time zone: UTC+1 (CET)
  - Summer (DST): UTC+2 (CEST)
- Postal code: 64042
- Dialing code: 0861
- ISTAT code: 067018
- Patron saint: Madonna di Costantinopoli
- Saint day: Lunedì dopo Pasqua
- Website: Official website

Colledara (Abruzzese: Cùllëdàrë) is a town and comune in province of Teramo in the Abruzzo region of southern Italy.

== Villages ==
- Villa Petto
