= San Giovanni Teatino =

- Comune
- Comune di San Giovanni Teatino
- Location within Italy Location within Abruzzo
- Coordinates: 42°25′N 14°12′E
- Country: Italy
- Region: Abruzzo
- Province: Chieti (CH)
- Frazioni: D'Ilio, Di Nisio, Dragonara, Fontechiaro, Sambuceto, Valle Lunga

Area
  - Total: 18 km^{2} (6.9 sq mi)
- Elevation: 145 m (476 ft)

Population (31 December 2008)
  - Total: 11,648
  - Density: 650/km^{2} (1,700/sq mi)
- Demonym: Sangiovannesi
- Time zone: UTC+1 (CET)
  - Summer (DST): UTC+2 (CEST)
- Postal code: 66020
- Dialing code: 085
- ISTAT code: 069081
- Patron saint: San Rocco
- Website: Official website

San Giovanni Teatino is a comune and town in the Province of Chieti in the Abruzzo region of Italy. Until 1894 this comune was known as Forcabobolina. Situated on a hill overlooking the valley of the river Pescara (Aterno-Pescara), in recent years the place has undergone an industrial development, especially in the area of Sambuceto (San Giovanni Teatino). Abruzzo Airport (Abruzzo International Airport, PSR) is also located in a portion of the municipal territory, close to the border with Pescara. In fact, the municipality is virtually divided into two, San Giovanni Teatino (Alto), which is the historic village on the hill, and the aforementioned Sambuceto, an ever-growing urban settlement, home to a large shopping area and an important industrialized area.

== History ==
The village was originally called "Forca Bobolina", from Forca, which means narrow valley (reference to the famous "Forche Caudine" (Battle of the Caudine Forks) of the Romans) and bos-bovis or ox. The oldest documentation dates back to medieval times, precisely in 1095, when the mention of a "Castellum Furca" (Castle of Forca) and a "Sambuceti silva" (Sambuceto forest), subject to a donation by the Norman Count Robert I of Loritello (one of the Hautevilles) to the Church of Chieti, in the person of Bishop Rainolfo (1085-1105). Bishop Rainolfo who later in 1099 gives the castle of Furca and Villamagna to his two grandchildren. These donations, among others, were confirmed later by Pope Paschal II in 1115.

Location of San Giovanni Teatino at the extreme north of Chieti province showing against neighboring Pescara Province

One of the defining traits of the ancient territory of Forcabobolina - Sambuceto was its dependency to the area of two demographic centers of importance: Aterno (Pescara) and Chieti. From the end of the 11th century CE at the beginning of the twelfth century, the relations between these cities and the then castle of Furca and Sambuceto were multi-faceted and complex. In the sources, this area is described as "silva" (forest). Chieti was the center of the episcopal power and also governing power, at least to the Normans, and exercised an institutional-political influence on Furca. The castle followed the institutional rulings of the teatino territory (teatino indicates the influence of the city of Chieti, which was originally called Theate (Greek: Θεάτη) (or Teate in Latin)), becoming, with the Norman bishop Rainolfo, a center of military political power at the service of the territorial lordship, exercising a strategic role in hosting the courts and being the seat of a military garrison.

Since the middle of the twelfth century, population growth led to the construction of the church of San Giovanni Evangelista, from which it derives the present name of San Giovanni Teatino. If the Norman conquest had the power to smash the bonds between the castle of Furca and Aterno, the territory of Sambuceto and its silva were still under the influence of Aterno, as evidenced by a diploma of Henry VI, the Holy Roman Emperor, which in 1195, cited a "silva et territorium Sambuceti" as a dependency of Pescara. Henry VI had become the King of Sicily in 1194 when he invaded the Norman Kingdom of Sicily to end the Hauteville Dynasty. King Henry VI's wife (Constance, Queen of Sicily) was also a Hauteville (a daughter of Roger II of Sicily, the founder of the Norman Kingdom of Sicily). In a 1228 document by Frederick II of Swabia (Frederick II, Holy Roman Emperor - Henry VI and Constance's son) attests that while Chieti has Furca under its political-institutional power, Pescara is a pole for its economic orientation.

From the Catasto Onciario, compiled in the years 1742-1743 and kept in the state archive of Naples, the families, the properties, and the places of the past are documented. An estimated 315 people lived in the town in 1743.

== Places of Interest ==
The places of touristic and cultural interest are mostly churches but with some other unusual aspects:

- Chiesa di San Giovanni Evangelista - Church of St. John the Evangelist: seventeenth century church, but completely restored in the nineteenth century. It has a robust rectangular plan with sacristy, and a neoclassical façade. The bell tower is a tower with cusp and clocks for four facades. The interior is a single nave;
- Piazza Marroni and Monumento ai caduti (Memorial for World War I);
- Museum of Natural Sciences: it is located in a villa located on top of the hill of the center;
- New San Rocco Church (Sanctuary): Construction work began in 2012. A work in progress which is being built under the famous Swiss architect
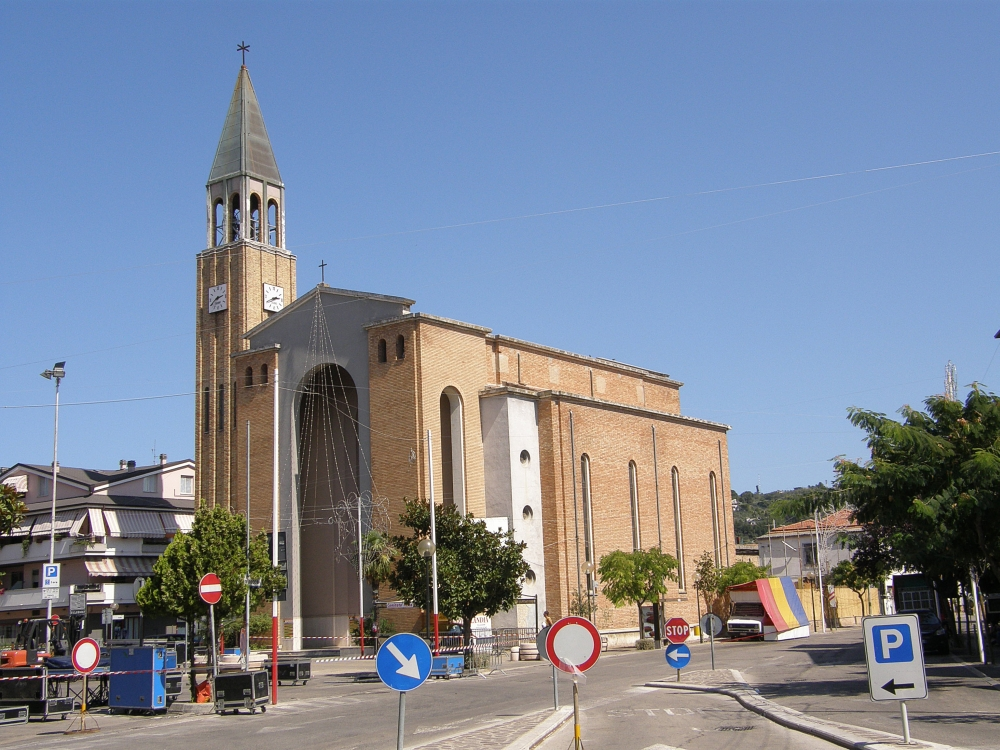
  the now demolished San Rocco Church in Sambuceto
  Mario Botta. It has a rectangular plan with porch and cloister, whose main body of the temple is rectangular. The bell tower is a tower with a printed cross on the top, whose pillars form the pillars of the roof itself. The historic church was built in the 18th century, with a rectangular plant and a hut facade, and a bell tower with overhanging for the clock cell. The church was destroyed, less the bell tower, in the Second World War, and was rebuilt from scratch in the 1950s, in a style between modern and neo-Roman. After the earthquake in 2009, for lack of restoration, it was declared dangerous and demolished for the new sanctuary;
- Church of Santa Maria De Cryptis, in Villa Reale, on the borders of San Silvestro (frazione of Pescara) an ancient, valuable church;
- Church of Immacolata Concezione known as church of De Laurentiis;
- Scuola Civica Musicale, founded in 2000, has the aim of promoting music culture in the area and permitting the fruition of professional and qualified music teaching also to those people who, for lack of time, age or economic reasons, cannot access state institutions or private lessons. Main purpose of the Civic School is contributing to the diffusion of music education as an essential element for cultural, social, intellectual growth of young people and entire community. The school is opened to everyone without discrimination. For this reason, one of the essential undertake of the school will be the possibility to give young people and disabled adults a chance of approaching the world of music as much complete as possible through the activation of special courses and its constant task in searching the forms and the most suitable ways for this purpose (from official website of the San Giovanni Teatino);
- Biblioteca e Ludoteca Comunali - where 5,200 books of various subjects are present, partly donated from generous users, partly bought by the municipality of San Giovanni Teatino sensitive to increase book interest.
- Calanchi - geomorphological phenomenon of land erosion which is the result of water leaching on degrading clay rocks with poor vegetable coverage and consequently modestly protected from the run-off.

== Economy ==
The main economy is commercial and industrial-based. Since the 1990s there have been manufacturing industries and shopping centers of various kinds, particularly in the flats of Sambuceto. Within the municipal area there are retail outlets of the national and international brands. The new center of San Giovanni is up and running on the current Via Tiburtina that connects with Pescara. Agricultural activities are mainly practiced on hill where orchards, olive groves and vineyards can be found.

== Geography ==
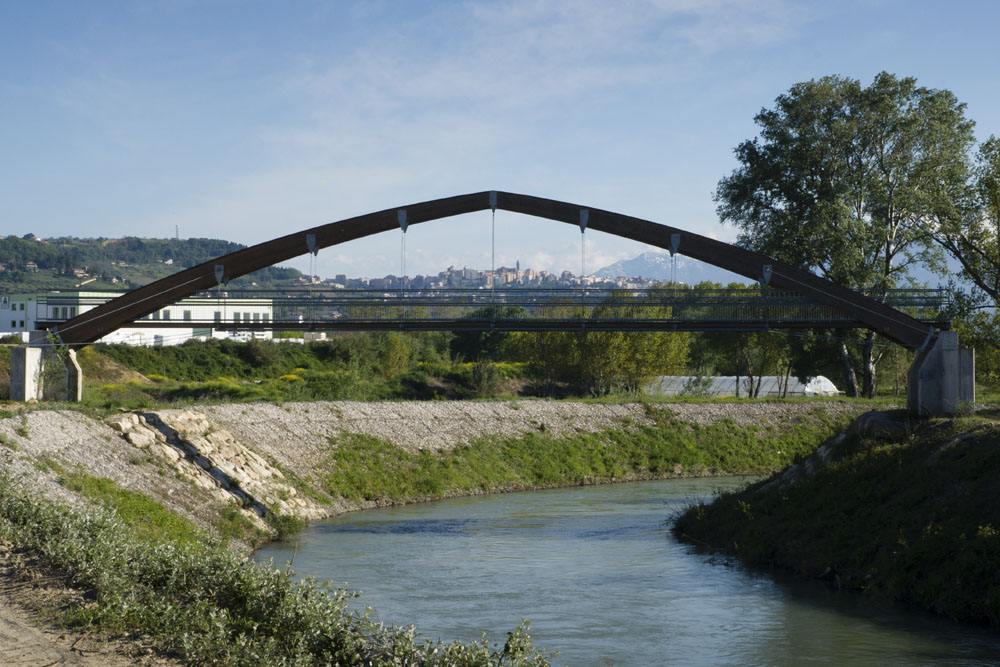
The San Giovanni Teatino Bridge over the Pescara River

The historic center of San Giovanni is located on a hill that has a notch in the center and does not take part in the dynamics of the valley below. The new center, located mainly along the old Via Tiburtina, developed after the seventies, as the Sambuceto plain was completely built up, resulting in a nearly uninterrupted residential and urban sprawl from Chieti to Pescara. The old sanctuary of San Rocco, extensively damaged in World War II, was rebuilt but damaged again in 2009 by the earthquake. Today, a new modern sanctuary is being constructed to serve the growing population. The population is estimated today at 14.150 compared to 5,075 in 1971.

Towards the sea, Sambuceto connects with the outskirts of Pescara, which now connects in a short time to the Portanuova. Sambuceto is also the home of the International Airport.
