= Villa Vomano =

Coordinates: 42°37′N 13°46′E

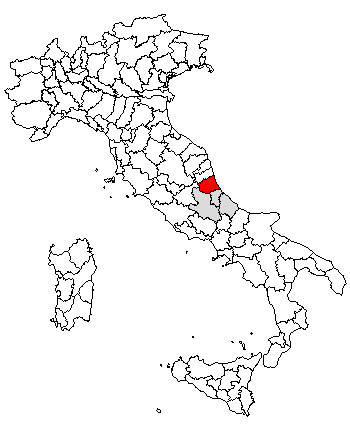
Location of Teramo in Italy

Villa Vomano is a small village in the province of Teramo, in the Abruzzo region of central Italy. It is a frazione of the town of Teramo.

== Geography ==
The village lies about 10 miles from Teramo, the provincial capital. It sits on the left bank of the Vomano River along State Road 81. Villa Vomano is midway between the Adriatic Sea and Monti della Laga hills which eventually lead to the Gran Sasso.

== History ==
A stone bridge connects Villa Vomano to the adjacent village of Val Vomano sitting on the opposite bank of the Vomano river. This bridge was the scene of an event deemed by many to be miraculous in nature. A bus filled with tourists making a pilgrimage to the sanctuary of Saint Gabriel of Our Lady of Sorrows had a tragic accident and slid nearly completely off the bridge. For some time it remained precariously balanced 35 feet above the Vomano River below and a rescue mission ended in success. Amazingly, no one was seriously injured and in appreciation a statue dedicated to the saint was erected along one of the banks of the river.

Given its close proximity to the highway running from Teramo to Rome, Villa Vomano in recent years has increased greatly in population and witnessed a good deal of building construction.
