= Borgorose =

- Comune
- Comune di Borgorose
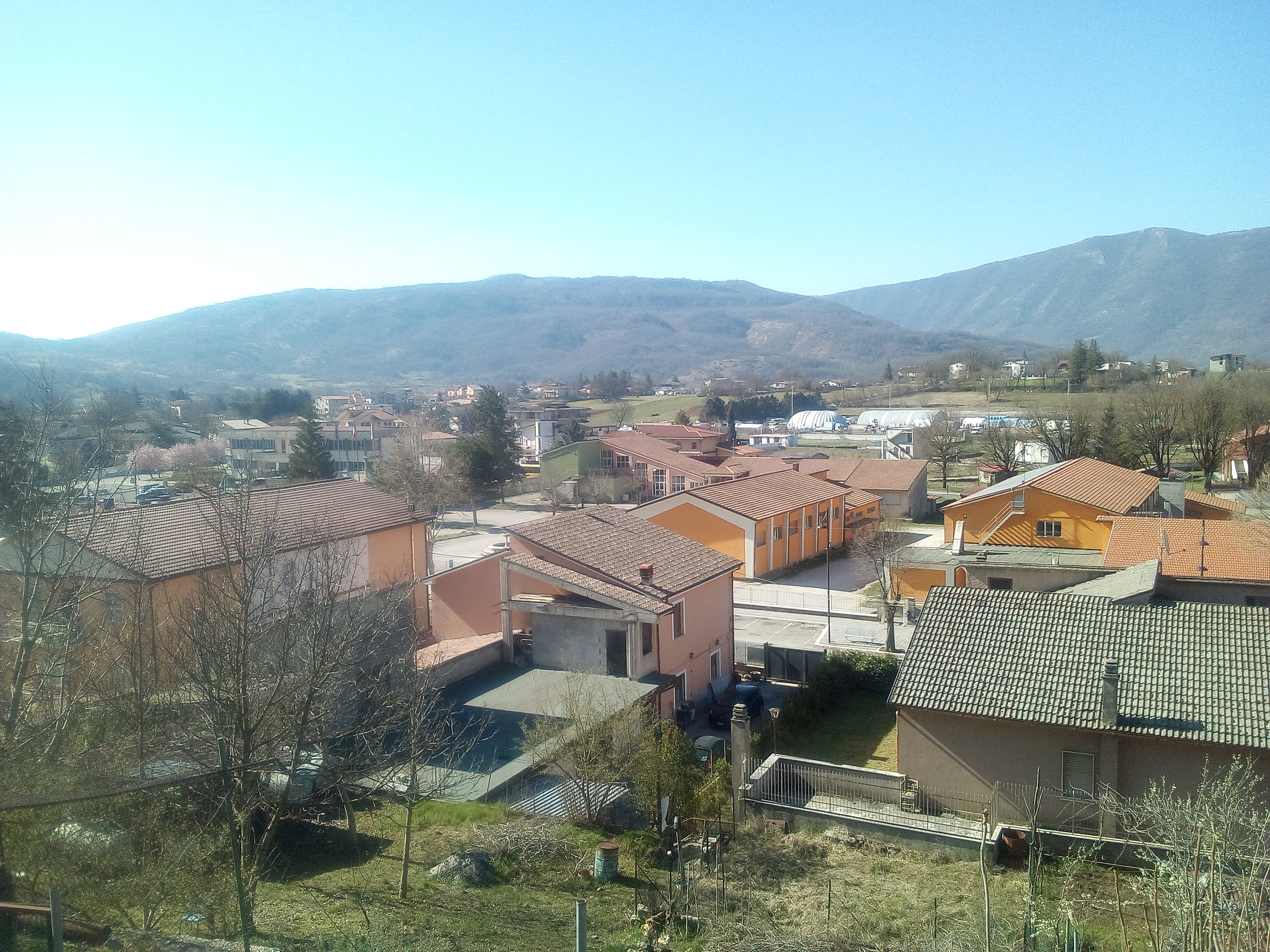
- View of Borgorose

- Coat of arms

- Location within Italy Location within Lazio
- Coordinates: 42°11′35″N 13°14′05″E
- Country: Italy
- Region: Lazio
- Province: Rieti (RI)
- Frazioni: Cartore, Castelmenardo, Collefegato, Collemaggiore, Colleviati, Collorso, Corvaro, Grotti, Pagliara, Poggiovalle, Ponte Civitella, Santa Anatolia, Santo Stefano, Spedino, Torano, Villerose, Villette

Government
  - Mayor: Mariano Calisse

Area
  - Total: 148.8 km^{2} (57.5 sq mi)
- Elevation: 732 m (2,402 ft)

Population (30 April 2008)
  - Total: 4,597
  - Density: 30.89/km^{2} (80.01/sq mi)
- Demonym: Borghiani
- Time zone: UTC+1 (CET)
  - Summer (DST): UTC+2 (CEST)
- Postal code: 02021
- Dialing code: 0746
- Website: Official website

Borgorose (Sabino: Ju Burgu) is a comune (municipality) in the Province of Rieti in the Italian region of Lazio, located about 70 kilometres (43 mi) northeast of Rome and about 40 kilometres (25 mi) southeast of Rieti.

Borgorose borders the following municipalities: L'Aquila, Lucoli, Magliano de' Marsi, Pescorocchiano, Sante Marie, Tornimparte. The frazione of Corvaro was the birthplace of Antipope Nicholas V.

Until 1960, the town was denominated Borgocollefegato. Near the town is the ruins of the Romanesque church and crypt of San Giovanni in Leopardis.

== See also ==
- Lake della Duchessa
