= Monte San Vicino =

Mountain in Italy

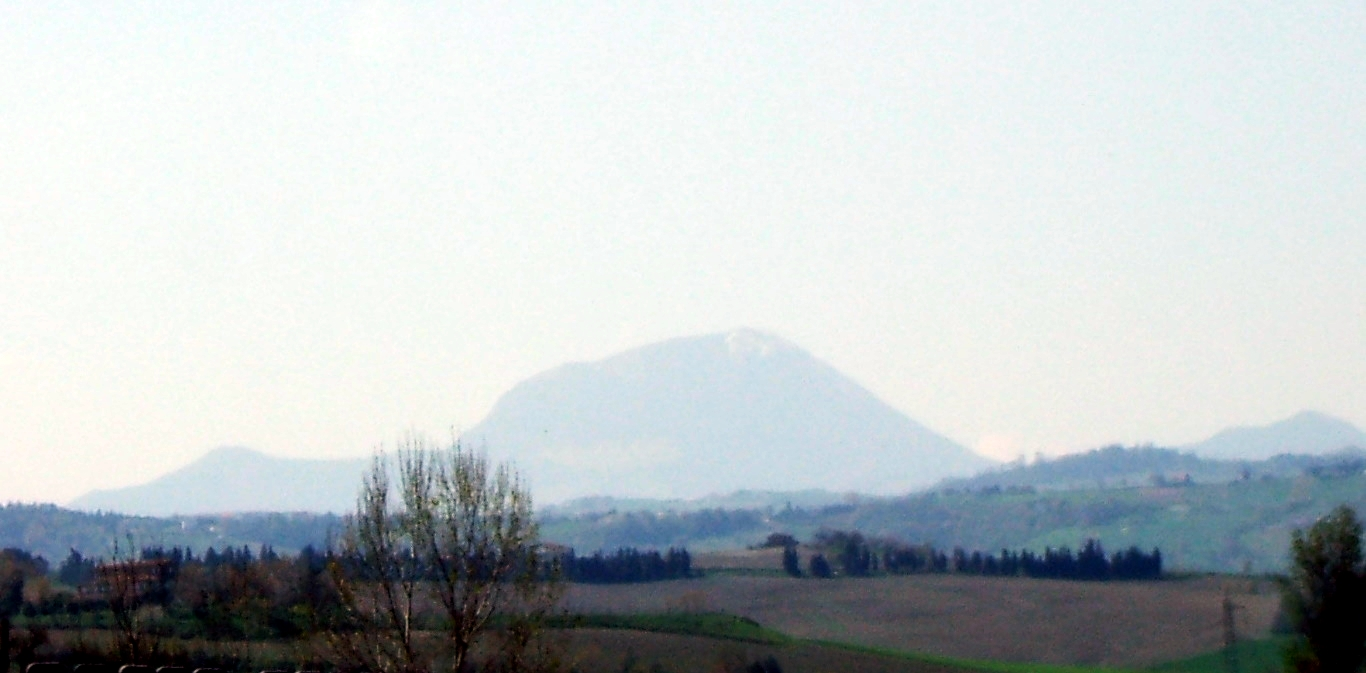

Highest point
- Elevation: 1,482 m (4,862 ft)
- Prominence: 1,102 m (3,615 ft)
- Listing: Ribu
- Coordinates: 43°19′51″N 13°03′43″E

Geography
- Location within Italy
- Location: Marche, Italy
- Parent range: Apennines

Monte San Vicino is a mountain of Marche, Italy.
