= Val Vomano =

Coordinates: 42°36′22″N 13°45′54″E

- Frazione
- Interactive map of Val Vomano
- Country: Italy
- Region: Abruzzo
- Province: Teramo
- Time zone: UTC+1 (CET)
  - Summer (DST): UTC+2 (CEST)

Val Vomano is a frazione in the Province of Teramo in the Abruzzo region of Italy.
