= Sambuceto, San Giovanni Teatino =

Sambuceto
- Frazione
- Interactive map of Sambuceto
- Coordinates: 42°25′20″N 14°11′13″E
- Country: Italy
- Region: Abruzzo
- Province: Chieti
- Commune: San Giovanni Teatino

Government

Area
  - Total: 1,170 sq mi (3,020 km^{2})
- Time zone: UTC+1 (CET)
  - Summer (DST): UTC+2 (CEST)

Sambuceto is a frazione (borough) in the municipality of San Giovanni Teatino, Province of Chieti, in the Abruzzo region of Italy. As of a 2021 census, the population of the borough is 10,763.
