= Cepagatti =

- Comune
- Comune di Cepagatti
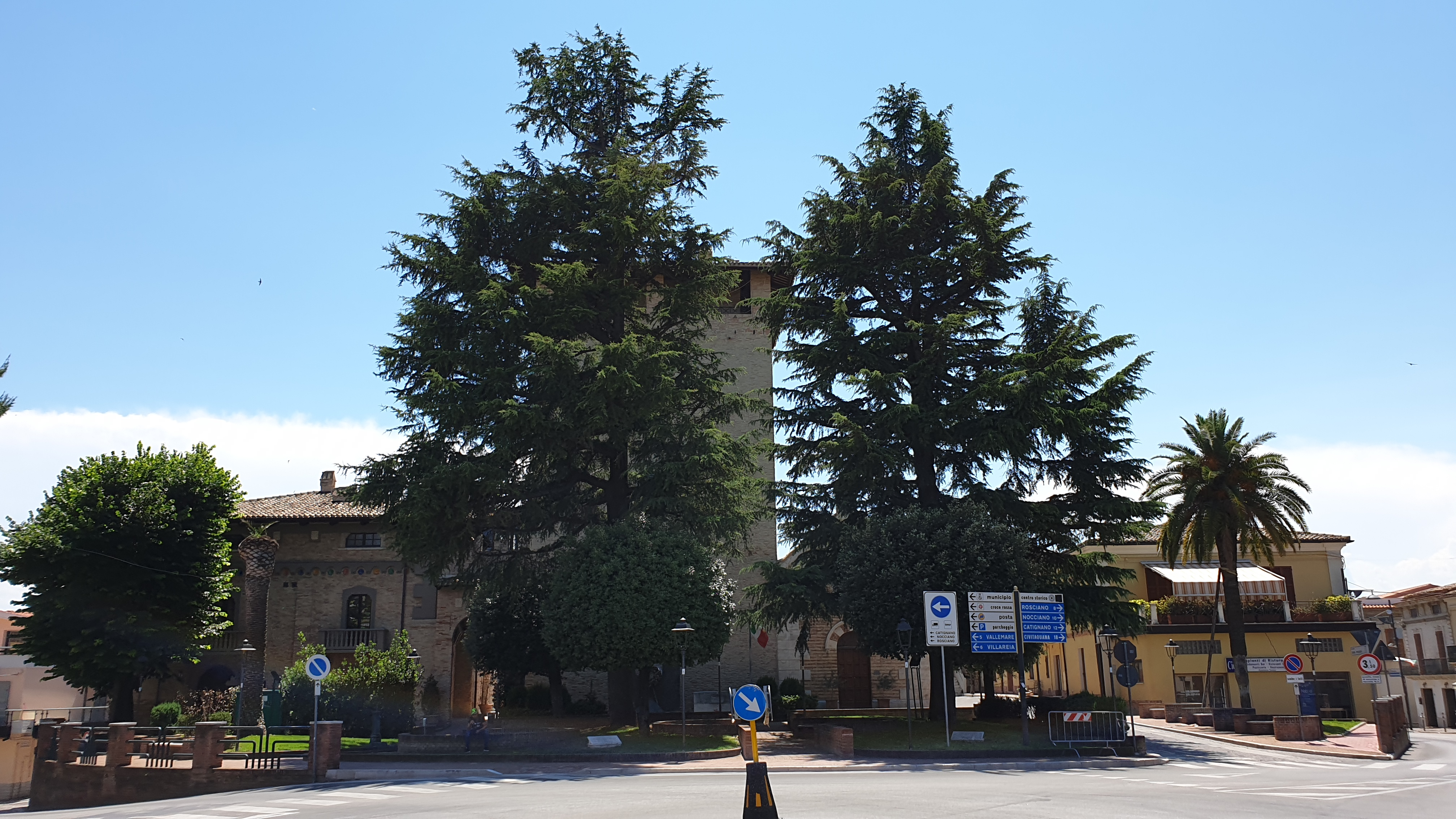
- View of Cepagatti

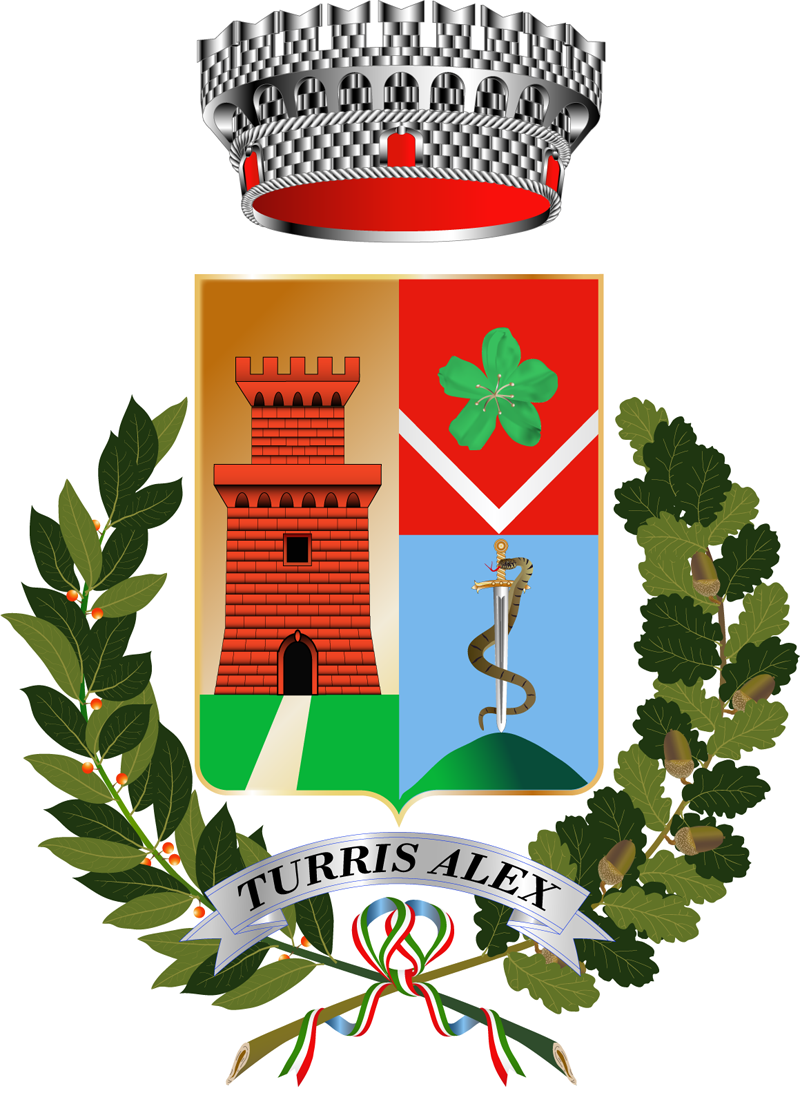
- Coat of arms

- Location within Italy Location within Abruzzo
- Coordinates: 42°22′N 14°04′E
- Country: Italy
- Region: Abruzzo
- Province: Pescara (PE)
- Frazioni: Buccieri, Calcasacco, Casoni Di Girolamo, Faciolo, Mongocitto, Palozzo, Rapattoni Nuovo, Rapattoni Vecchio, Sant'Agata, Santuccione, Sborgia, Tre Croci, Vallemare, Villanova, Villareia

Government
  - Mayor: Gino Canto' (since 2023) (Cepagatti C'è)

Area
  - Total: 30.34 km^{2} (11.71 sq mi)
- Elevation: 145 m (476 ft)

Population (2024)
  - Total: 10,964
  - Density: 361.4/km^{2} (935.9/sq mi)
- Time zone: UTC+1 (CET)
  - Summer (DST): UTC+2 (CEST)
- Postal code: 65012
- Dialing code: 085
- Patron saint: Rocco e Lucia

Cepagatti (locally Cipahàttë) is a comune (municipality) and town in the Province of Pescara in the Abruzzo region of Italy.

The closest airport is Abruzzo Airport, which is 10 miles distance. The beach is a 13 mile drive. The town does not have a hospital in the town proper, but Annunziata Hospital is located in the neighboring town 4.5 miles away.
