= Tornimparte =

- Comune
- Comune di Tornimparte
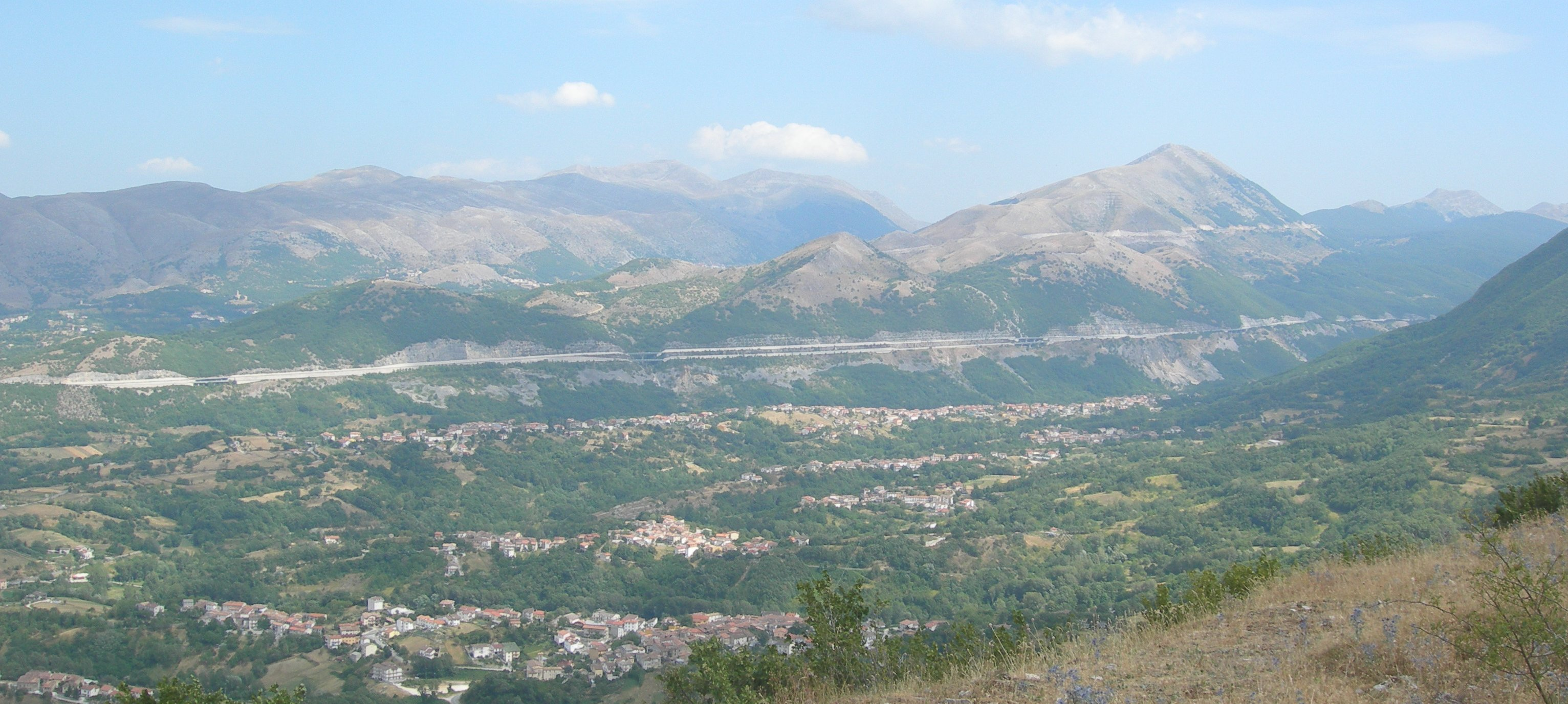

- Location within Italy Location within Abruzzo
- Coordinates: 42°17′47″N 13°18′3″E
- Country: Italy
- Region: Abruzzo
- Province: L'Aquila (AQ)
- Frazioni: Castiglione, Capo La Villa, Villagrande, Capolitto, Case Tirante, Piè la Villa, Piagge, Pianelle, Colle San Vito, Colle Santa Maria, Barano, San Nicola, Colle Massimo, Colle Perdonesco, Viaro, Molino di Salomone, Pié La Costa, Colle Castagno, Collefarelli, Colle Fiascone, Forcelle, Palombaia, Rocca Santo Stefano

Government
  - Mayor: Giacomo Carnicelli

Area
  - Total: 65.96 km^{2} (25.47 sq mi)
- Elevation: 830 m (2,720 ft)

Population (31 December 2015)
  - Total: 3,187
  - Density: 48.32/km^{2} (125.1/sq mi)
- Demonym: Tornimpartesi
- Time zone: UTC+1 (CET)
  - Summer (DST): UTC+2 (CEST)
- Postal code: 67049
- Dialing code: 0862
- Patron saint: Our Lady of Sorrows
- Saint day: 15 October
- Website: Official website

Tornimparte is a comune and town in the province of L'Aquila in the Abruzzo region of central-southern Italy.

== Geography ==
Tornimparte is subdivided into 23 wards (frazioni): Castiglione, Capo La Villa, Villagrande, Capolitto, Case Tirante, Piè la Villa, Piagge, Pianelle, Colle San Vito, Colle Santa Maria, Barano, San Nicola, Colle Massimo, Colle Perdonesco, Viaro, Molino di Salomone, Pié La Costa, Colle Castagno, Collefarelli, Colle Fiascone, Forcelle, Palombaia, Rocca Santo Stefano. Villagrande is the principal town and it is the administrative seat of the municipality.

== Transport ==
Tornimparte has a station on the Terni–Sulmona railway, with trains to Terni, Rieti and L'Aquila.
