= Pelinus =

Italian monk and bishop (c. 620–662)

Saint Pelinus or Pelinus of Brindisi (Italian: San Pelino) (c. 620 – 5 December 662) was a Basilian monk, later bishop of Brindisi in Italy, martyred at Corfinio and made a saint in 668. His feast day is Dec. 5.

== Life ==
Pelinus was a native of Dyrrachium. After becoming a Basilian monk, he opposed the Monothelite heresy which spread from Byzantium during the reigns of Heraclius (610–641) and Constans II (641–668), and for that reason moved to Brindisi with his disciples Gorgonius, Sebastius and Cyprius. Relations between Rome and Byzantium worsened to the point that Pope Martin I excommunicated the Patriarch Sergius and the Monothelite heretics, but was arrested, deported to Constantinople and eventually exiled to Cherson in Crimea where he died in 655. In Brindisi, the unyielding loyalty of Pelinus in the circle around the bishop Proculus likewise brought him to breaking point in his relations with the court of Constantinople. On the death of Proculus, Pelinus was designated bishop of Brindisi, but functionaries of the Byzantine empire deported him to Corfinio, where he was condemned to death and executed with his disciples on 5 December, probably in 662.

== Cult ==
The canonisation of Pelinus took place in 668 (after the death of Constans II) by the agency of Cyprius, his successor as bishop of Brindisi. On this occasion a "Life" was composed, quite possibly also by the agency of Cyprius in order to promote Brindisi as the centre of the cult of his predecessor. For centuries he was the patron saint of Brindisi together with Saint Leucius.

In 1771 an altar was dedicated to him in Brindisi Cathedral showing his martyrdom, painted by Oronzo Tiso.

He is patron of the diocese of Sulmona-Valva. The former Corfinio Cathedral, now a basilica, is dedicated to him, and his cult in the Marsica area is attested by the name of the small town of San Pelino, a frazione of Avezzano, where he is said to have passed by on his return from a journey to Rome.

The Roman Martyrology places Pelinus in the 4th century, on the basis of a local tradition that Pelinus was the successor of the first bishop of Brindisi, Leucius: "At Corfinio (Pentima) in Abruzzo, Saint Pelinus bishop of Brindisi, who (after the Temple of Mars had collapsed thanks to his prayers) under Julian the Apostate having been sorely beaten and wounded with eighty-five wounds by the priests of the pagan temples, earned the crown of martyrdom".

== Bibliography ==
- Vita e miracoli del glorioso martire S. Pelino vescovo di Brindesi e protettore di Pentima cavata e tradotta da un ecclesiastico dalla lingua latina nell'idioma italiano, Chieti 1737
- Giuseppe Celidonio, La diocesi di Valva e Sulmona, in part.: Le origini cristiane: S.Pelino V. e M. nella leggenda e nella storia, S.Panfilo V. e patrono di Sulmona nella leggenda e nella storia, S.Feliciano di Foligno in Sulmona, Propagazione del cristianesimo nei Peligni Casalbordino 1909
- Bernardino De Silvestri, Esame apologetico su la vita e passione di S. Pelino Martire Arcivescovo di Brindisi e protettore di Valva, Prato 1886

== Sources and external links ==
- Santiebeati.it: San Pelino (in Italian)
