= Museo civico archeologico Antonio De Nino =

Coordinates: 42.1245°N 13.8441°E

- Location: Corfinio
- Type: Archaeology museum
- Website: http://www.museocorfinio.it/

Museo civico archeologico Antonio De Nino (Italian for Antonio De Nino Archaeology Civic Museum) is an archaeology museum in Corfinio, Abruzzo.

== History ==
The museum was opened in 2005, housed in the Colella-Trippitelli family palace, dating back to the 17th century, to host the artifacts discovered during the excavations carried out by Antonio De Nino in Corfinio at the end of the 19th century and continued by Don Nicola Colella, canon of San Pelino.

The artifacts recovered during the 1878 excavations were initially housed in the rooms of the Oratory of Sant'Alessandro, but the museum was plundered during the German occupation in World War II. The exhibition was temporarily reassembled in rooms adjacent to the cathedral but the collection was eventually transferred to Chieti until the opening of the new museum.

== Collection ==
The museum's ten rooms are spread over two floors. On the ground floor, there is a reconstruction of Antonio De Nino's study, with some of his works and some of the artifacts he found. The first floor houses the exhibition rooms organized by thematic areas.

== Bibliography ==
- "Corfinium, resti della città romana - Corfinio". Musei e siti archeologici d'Abruzzo e Molise (in Italian). Pescara: Carsa Edizioni. 2001. p. 50. ISBN 8850100043.
