= Teatro dei Marsi =

Opera house in Avezzano, Italy

Coordinates: 42.0429°N 13.4228°E

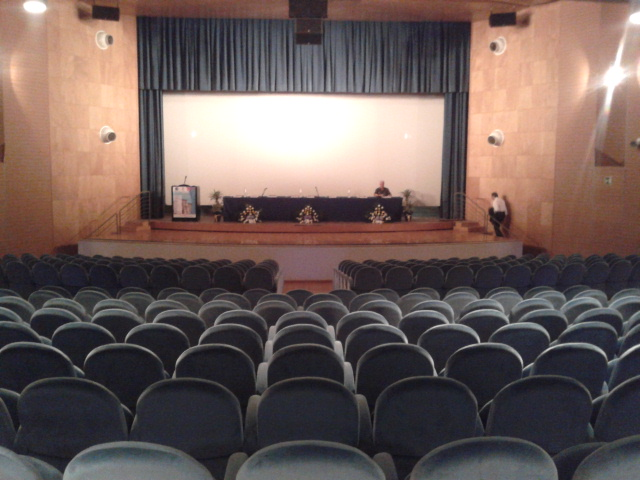
Theater audience of Teatro dei Marsi

The Teatro dei Marsi is an opera house in Avezzano, Italy. Inaugurated in 2006 and named after the Italic people of the Marsi, it allowed the city to once again have a theatre structure after the destruction of the historic "Ruggeri theatre" following the 1915 Marsica earthquake.

In 1922 the municipal administration decided to build a new theatre. The original project envisaged the destruction of what remained of the pre-existing Ruggeri theatre located in Piazza Castello. The process that led to the presentation of the project dates back only to 1935, in fact it suffered significant delays due to bureaucratic problems related to the practice of financing the work. In 1968, after the war events and a long period of stalemate, the municipal administration and the Civil Engineering Department obtained recognition of the rights claimed by the municipality for the financing of the previously destroyed theatre.

In 1971 the new project was developed by the architect Furio Cruciani, a few years later the construction of the new modern theatre began with dimensions adequate for an expanding city. It has a capacity of approximately 800 spectators between parterre and gallery

The new theatre, after a long planning and bureaucratic phase, was completed in 2006. Before the opening of the Teatro dei Marsi, theatrical works were performed in the Orsini-Colonna Castle.
