= Groundling (disambiguation) =

A groundling was a person who visited the Red Lion, The Rose, or the Globe Theatre in the early 17th century.

Groundling may also refer to:

- Prolita sexpunctella, or groundling, a moth
- Brachythemis, or groundlings, a genus of dragonflies
- The Groundlings, an improvisational and sketch comedy troupe and school
