= Avezzano Courthouse =

Building in Avezzano, Italy

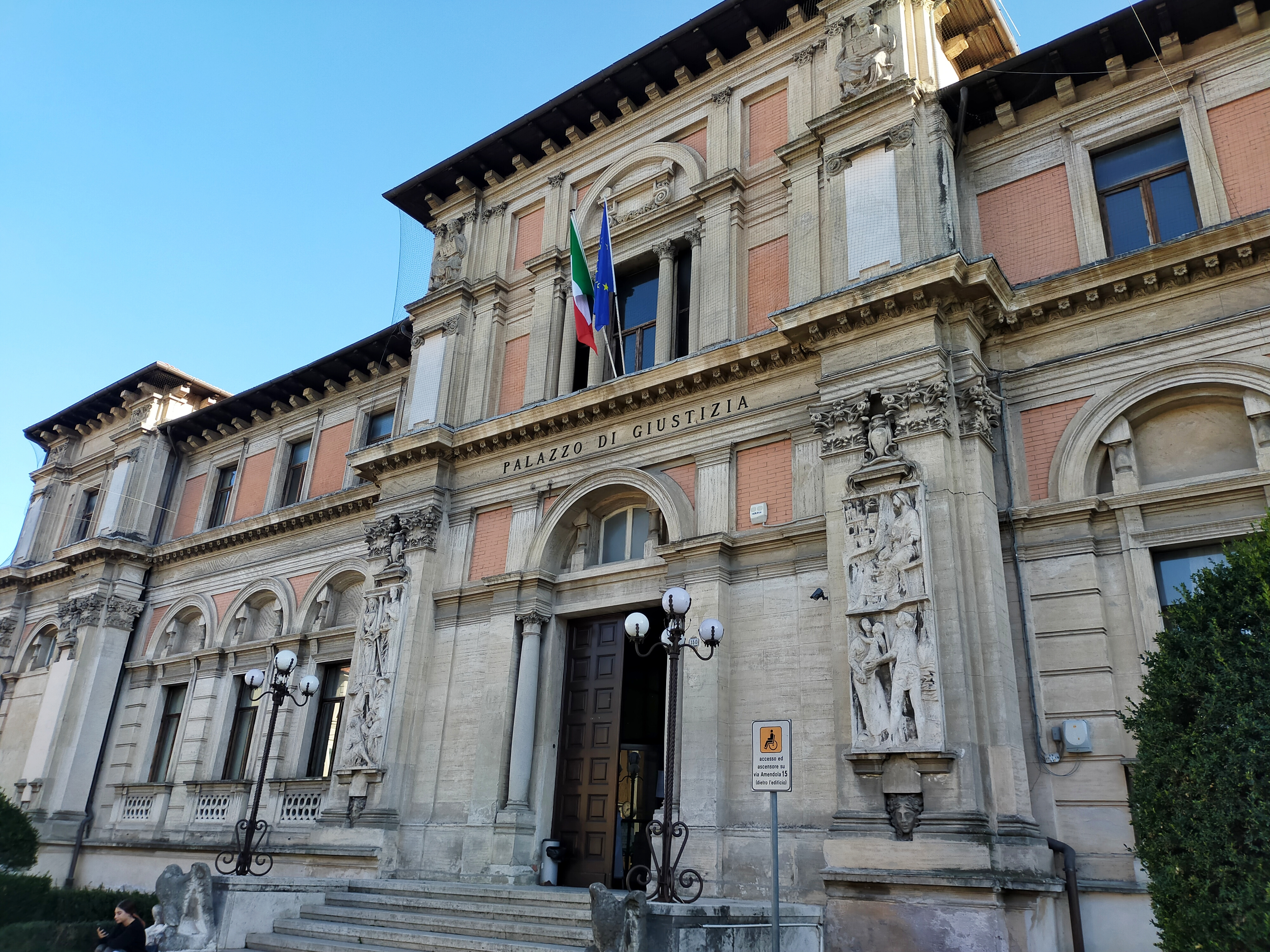

General information
- Location: Avezzano, Abruzzo, Italy
- Coordinates: 42°2′9.12″N 13°25′41.28″E
- Construction started: 1922
- Completed: 1931

Design and construction
- Architect: Luigi Gallo

The Avezzano Courthouse (Italian: Palazzo di Giustizia) is a judicial building located on Via Corradini in Avezzano, Italy.

== History ==
The Chancellor's Office of the Subprefecture of Avezzano was established during the Napoleonic era on 10 June 1811, but the Court was instead established by Royal Decree-Law No. 329 of 20 November 1861 and inaugurated on 1 May 1862 in the former convent of San Francesco. Subsequently, it was housed in the Palazzo Mancini near Piazza Torlonia and later in some rooms of the Orsini-Colonna Castle.

After the earthquake of 13 January 1915, the judicial offices reopened in some prefabricated structures on 20 April 1915, in the presence of the Minister of Grace and Justice, Vittorio Emanuele Orlando. Later, they were moved to temporary accommodations, first in Via Mazzini and then in Via Corradini.

Thanks to a special legislative provision from the Ministry of Public Works, the Municipality of Avezzano took possession of the expropriated areas from the State, which were used for various logistical needs during the earthquake emergency. Among these was the land on which the construction of the Courthouse began.

Designed in 1917 by architect Luigi Gallo and contracted to the Elia Micangeli company, the building was constructed starting in 1922 and completed between 1930 and 1931.

In 1944, the courthouse was severely damaged by the World War II bombings that devastated the city. It was subsequently restored in accordance with the original design.

== Sources ==
- Belmaggio, Francesco (2000). Avezzano nel tempo e i suoi sindaci. Avezzano: LCL Stampe Litografiche.
- Ciranna, Simonetta; Montuori, Patrizia (2015). Tempo, spazio e architetture. Avezzano, cento anni o poco più. Rome: Artemide.
- Marcangeli, Giovanni (2022). Giampiero Nicoli (ed.). Avezzano storia della città moderna. Avezzano: Radici Edizioni.
- Pagani, Giovanni (1966). Avezzano e la sua storia. Casamari: Tipografia dell'Abbazia.
- Palmieri, Eliseo (2006). Avezzano, un secolo di immagini. Pescara: Paolo de Siena Editore.
