= Paterno, Avezzano =

Coordinates: 42°03′22″N 13°28′34″E

Paterno
- Frazione
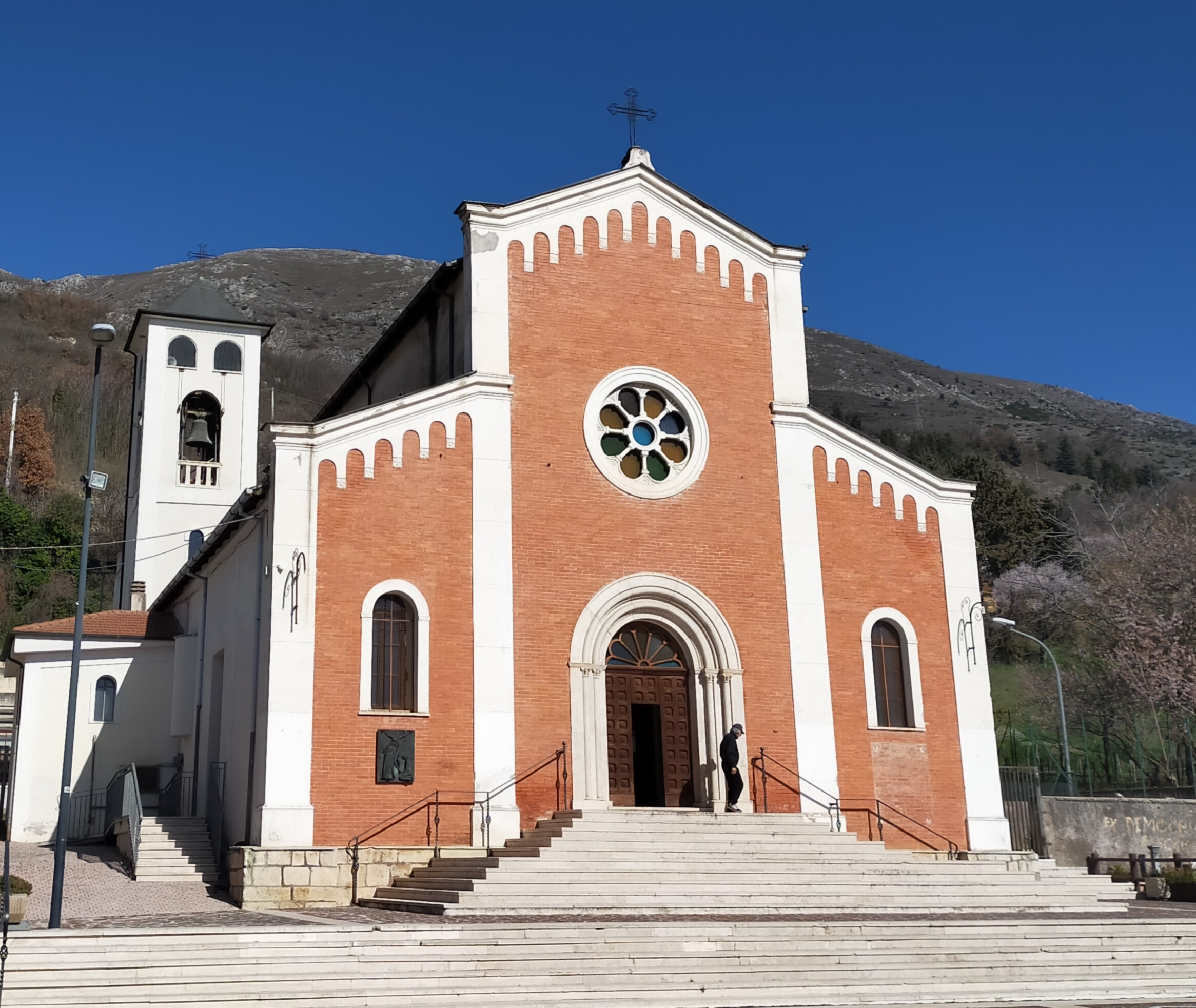
- St. Sebastian Church in Paterno
- Interactive map of Paterno
- Country: Italy
- Region: Abruzzo
- Province: L'Aquila
- Commune: Avezzano
- Time zone: UTC+1 (CET)
  - Summer (DST): UTC+2 (CEST)

The frazione Paterno is a small town established in the Middle Ages in the Avezzano comune, 5 kilometers from Avezzano itself, within the province of L'Aquila, Abruzzo region, in the Apennine Mountains within the centre (geometry) of Italy. Its population in 2015 was 1,810.
