= Stadio dei Pini (Avezzano) =

Sport venue in Avezzano (AQ), Italy

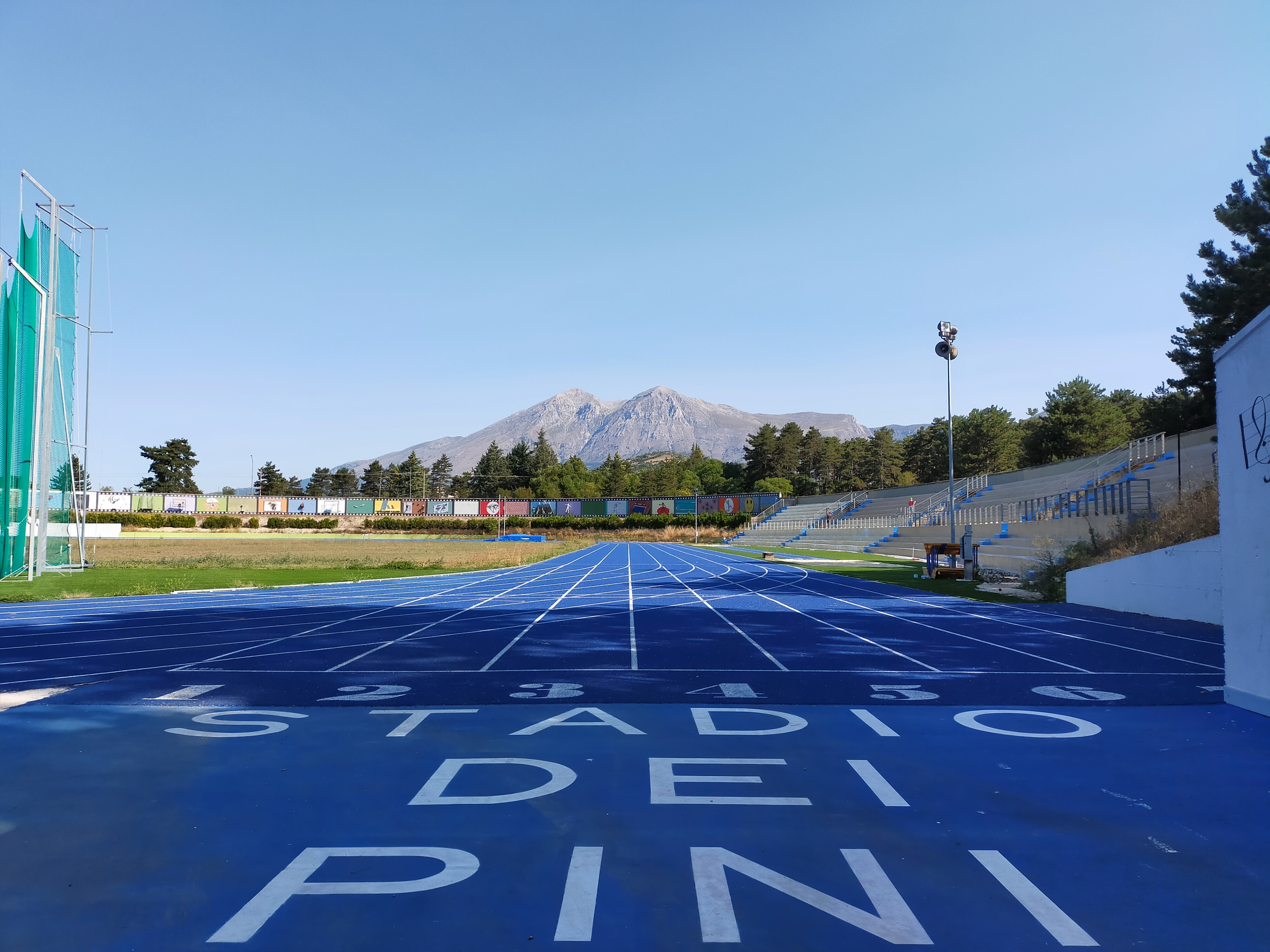
- View of the stadium, with Monte Velino in the background
- Interactive map of Stadio dei Pini
- Full name: Stadio dei Pini
- Location: Avezzano, Italy
- Coordinates: 42.0498°N 13.4165°E

Construction
- Built: 1973

Tenant
- Meeting internazionale "Città di Avezzano" Trofeo "Pietro Marianella"

Stadio dei Pini is an athletics stadium located in Avezzano, Italy. Since 1974 the stadium hosted the International meeting "Città di Avezzano" Trofeo "Pietro Marianella".

== History ==
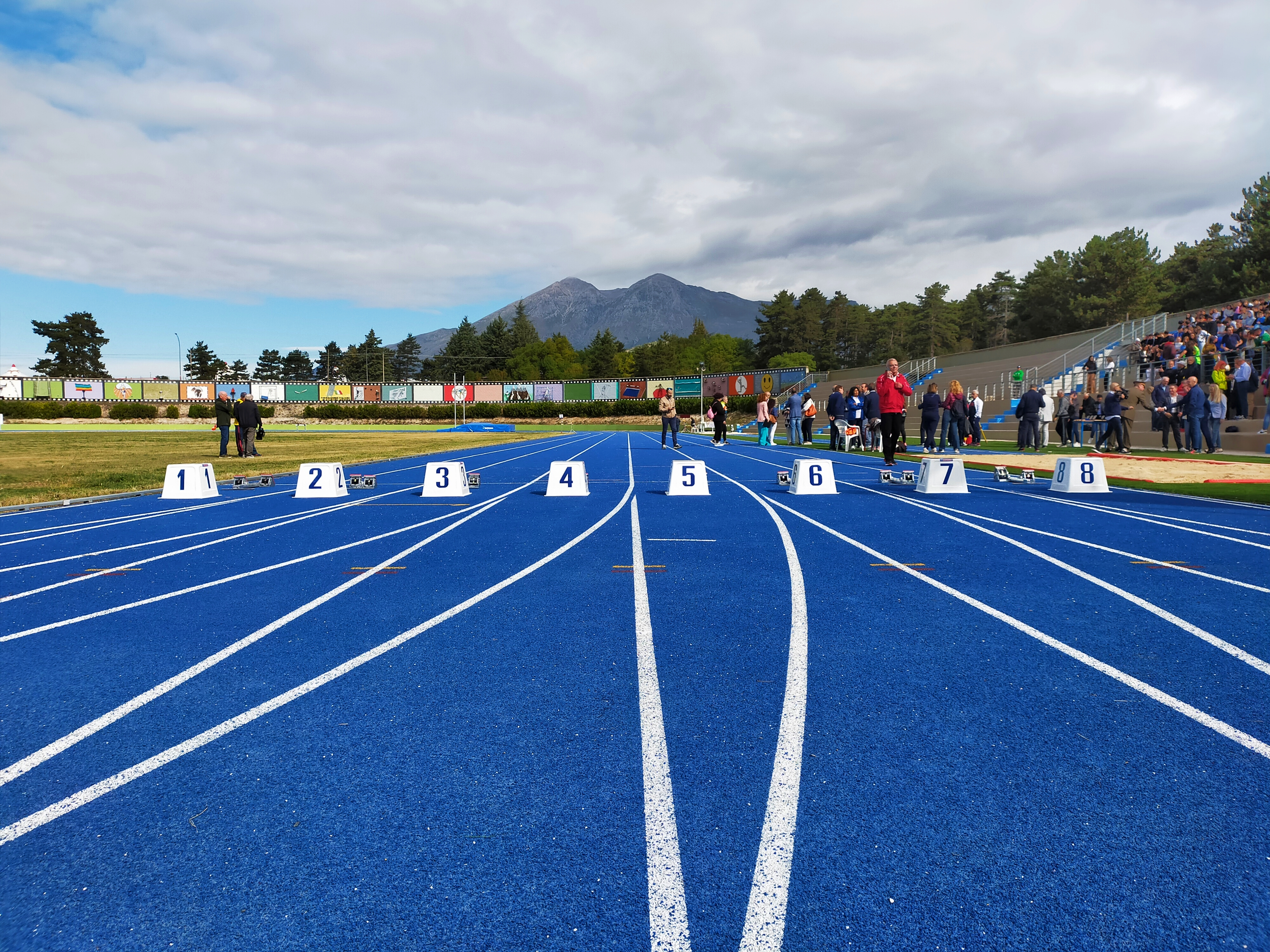
Running tracks and starting blocks of the stadium

The stadium, built in the 1970s, hosted the athletics International meeting "Pietro Marianella", for several years, an international event which saw the participation of Olympic and world-class athletes such as Pietro Mennea e Sara Simeoni who in 1974 set the Italian high jump record, and Steve Williams.

Renovated in 1989 also thanks to Mario Pescante Secretary General at the time of Italian National Olympic Committee (CONI) in the stadium competed athletes of the highest level such as Asafa Powell, Fiona May, Stefano Tilli, Fabrizio Mori, Stefano Baldini, Manuela Levorato, Butch Reynolds, Andrea Benvenuti and Giovanni De Benedictis.

Renovated again in 2025, the running track was inaugurated by the president of the Italian Athletics Federation (FIDAL), Stefano Mei.

== Description ==
The stadium is located in nord Avezzano, surrounded by approximately 60,000 square meters of pine forest, features an 8-lane outdoor athletics track. The eight lanes, the platforms and jumping pits, the throwing cages and all the equipment are FIDAL certified and compliant with World Athletics standards.

== Bibliography ==
- Del Gusto, Federico (1995). Avezzano, un secolo di sport (in Italian). Avezzano: Di Censo editore.
