= Castelnuovo, Avezzano =

Coordinates: 42°5′0″N 13°27′0″E

Castelnuovo
- Frazione
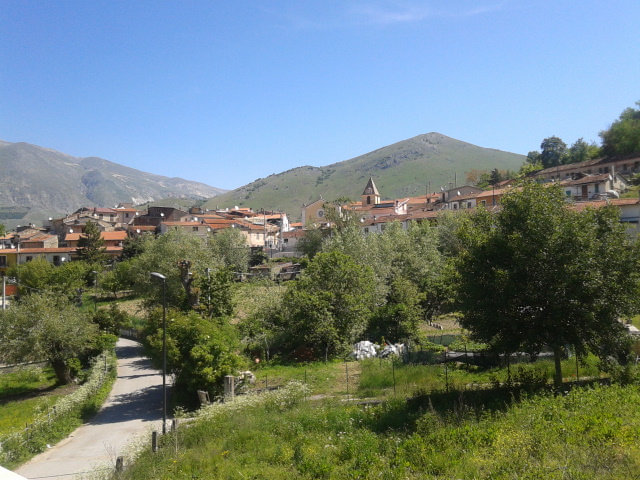
- Interactive map of Castelnuovo
- Country: Italy
- Region: Abruzzo
- Province: L'Aquila
- Commune: Avezzano
- Time zone: UTC+1 (CET)
  - Summer (DST): UTC+2 (CEST)

The frazione Castelnuovo is a small town established in the Middle Ages in the Avezzano comune, 8 kilometers from Avezzano itself, within the province of L'Aquila, Abruzzo region, in the Apennine Mountains within the centre (geometry) of Italy. Its population in 2001 was 182.
