= Antrosano =

Coordinates: 42°03′49″N 13°24′42″E

- Frazione
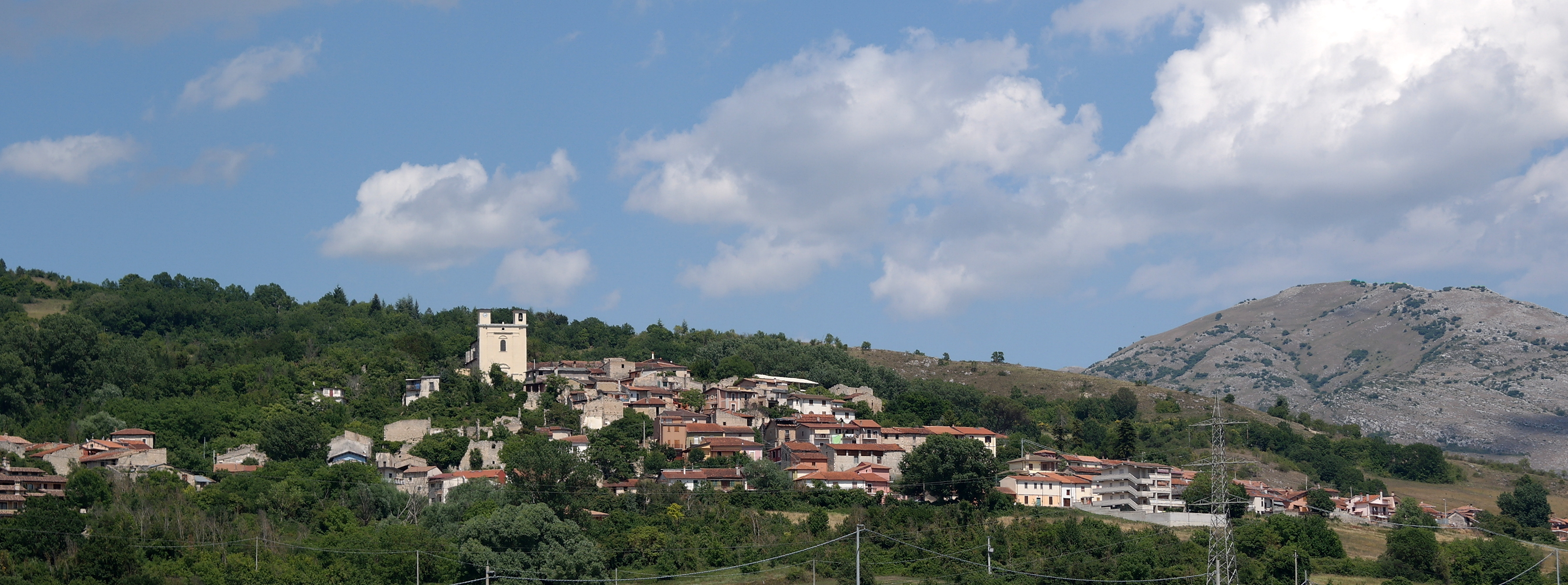
- View of Antrosano
- Interactive map of Antrosano
- Country: Italy
- Region: Abruzzo
- Province: L'Aquila
- Commune: Avezzano
- Time zone: UTC+1 (CET)
  - Summer (DST): UTC+2 (CEST)

The frazione Antrosano is a small town established between in the Avezzano comune and Alba Fucens, to 4,5 kilometers from Avezzano itself, within the province of L'Aquila, Abruzzo region, in the Apennine Mountains within the centre (geometry) of Italy. Its population in 2015 was about 1,000.
