= Corfinio Cathedral =

Roman Catholic cathedral in Abruzzo, Italy

Coordinates: 42.1185°N 13.8362°E

Corfinio Cathedral Chiesa di San Pelino
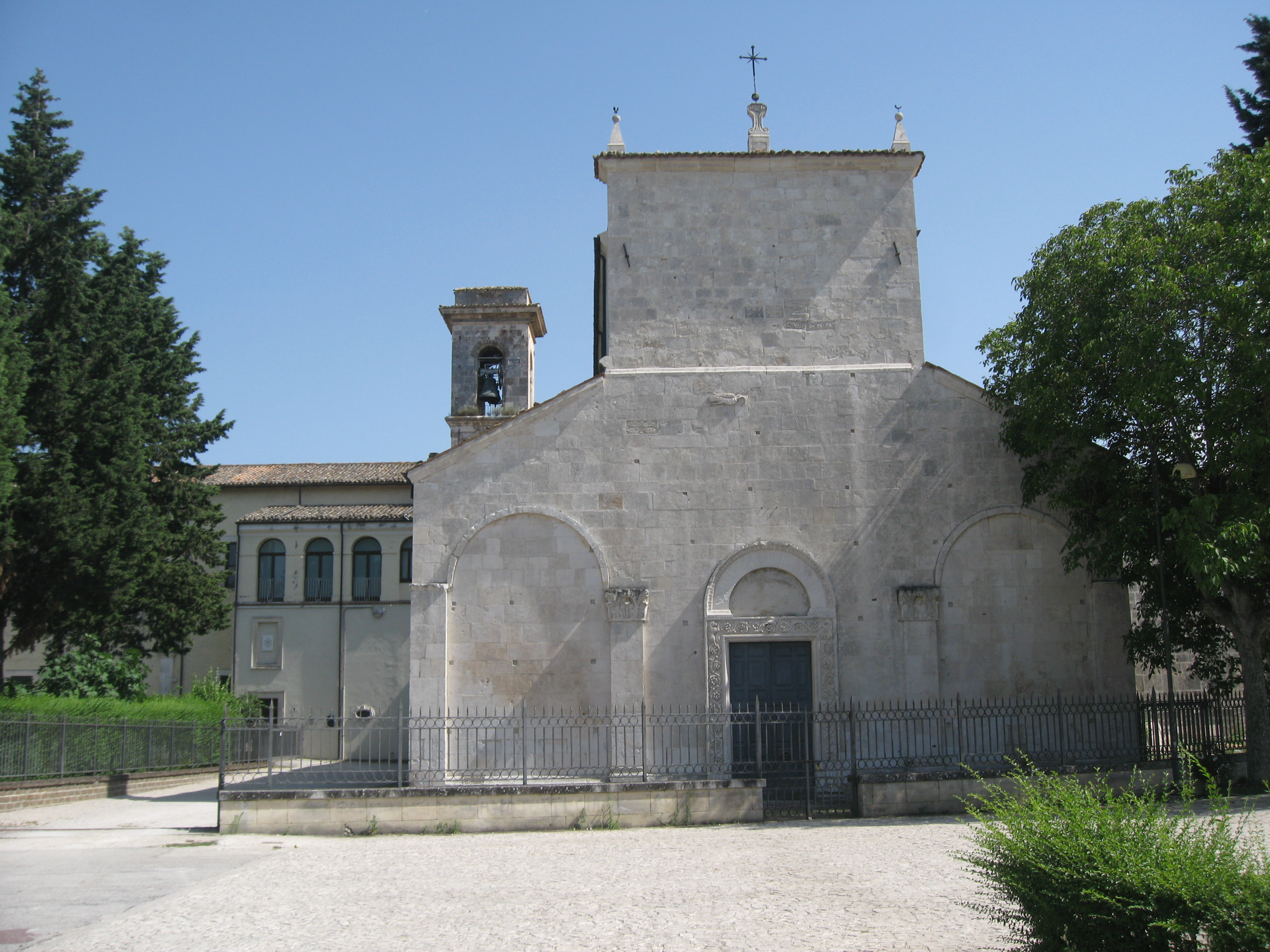
- View of the cathedral

Religion
- Affiliation: Roman Catholic
- Province: Diocese of Sulmona-Valva
- Region: Abruzzo
- Rite: Latin Rite

Location
- Location: Corfinio
- State: Italy
- Interactive map of Corfinio Cathedral; Chiesa di San Pelino

Architecture
- Type: Church
- Style: Romanesque
- Groundbreaking: 1075
- Completed: 1124

Corfinio Cathedral (Italian: Cattedrale di Corfinio; Basilica chiesa di San Pelino) is a Roman Catholic cathedral in Corfinio, Abruzzo, Italy, dedicated to Saint Pelinus. It was formerly the episcopal seat of the Diocese of Valva (Valva was a former name of Corfinio) and is now a co-cathedral in the Diocese of Sulmona-Valva.

The basilica was erected putatively on the site of the martyrdom of St Pelinus in the 7th century. The complex at the site includes the Romanesque-style Basilica initially built in 1235, but reconstructed over the centuries due to earthquake damage. In the 19th-century, a refurbishment stripped Baroque decoration and led to the bare stone interiors of the apse. The semicircular apse retains some 13th-century frescoes. Attached to the church is the Oratory of Sant'Alessandro, frescoed in the 14th-century, and putatively holding the burial site of pope Alexander I (109-119).
