= Groundling =

17th-century London theatre patron

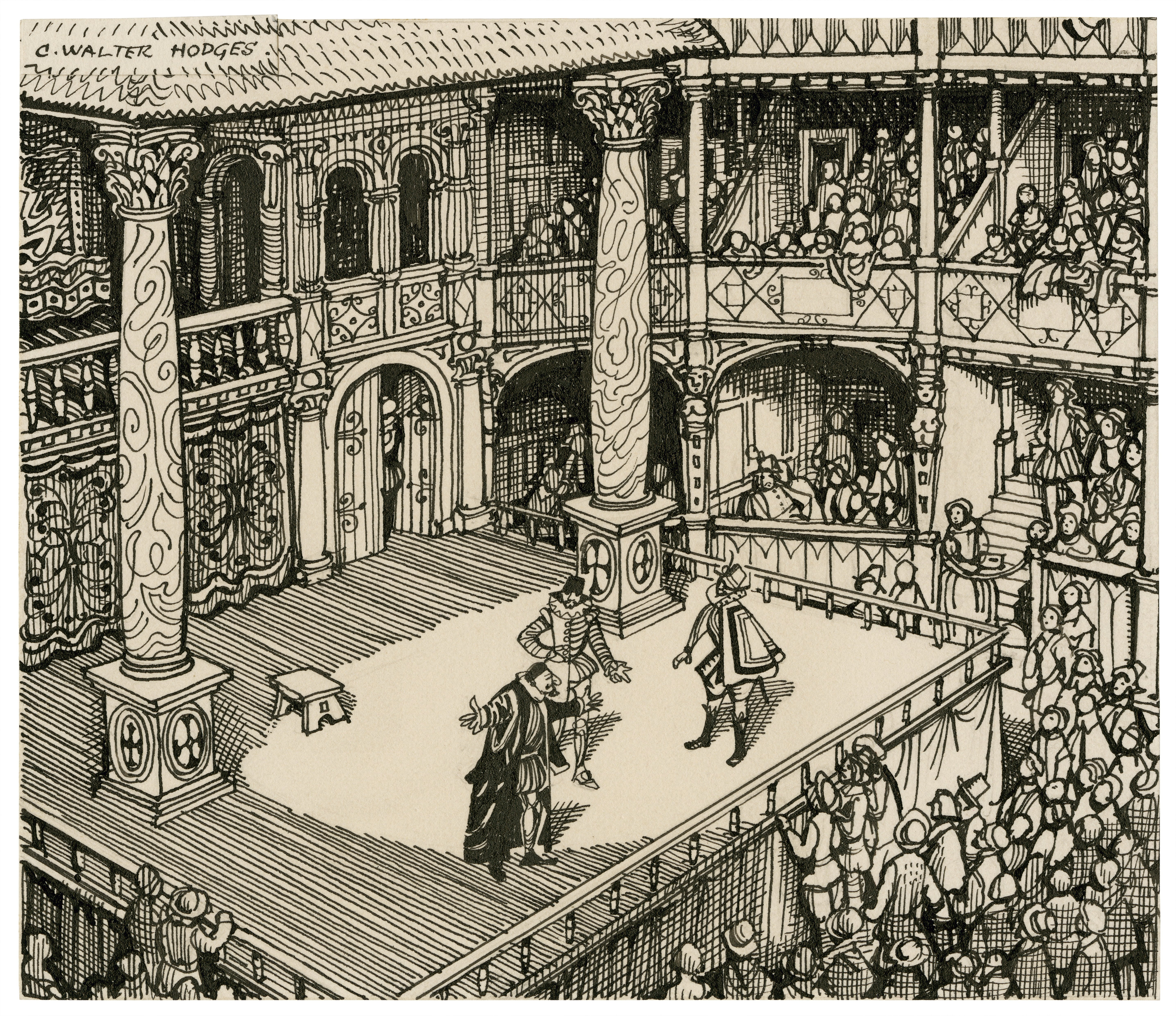
An imagined Elizabethan theatre, the groundlings standing in the bottom right

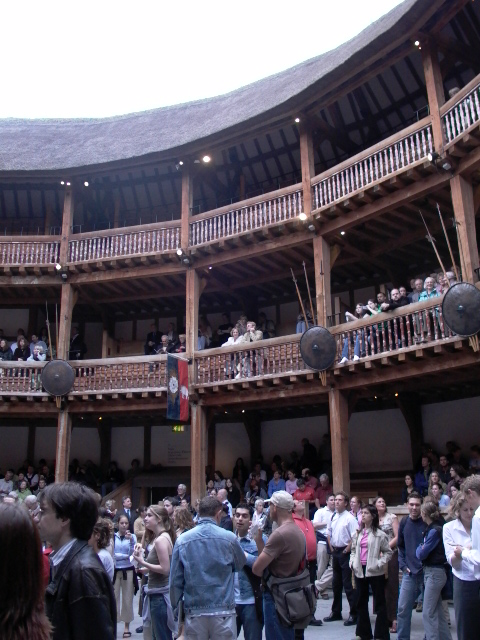
The pit and upper levels of the reconstruction of the Globe

A groundling was a person who visited the Red Lion, The Rose, or the Globe theatres in the early 17th century. They were too poor to pay to be able to sit on one of the three levels of the theatre. If they paid one penny (equivalent to £1 in 2023), they could stand in "the pit", also called "the yard", just below the stage, to watch the play. Standing in the pit was uncomfortable, and people were usually packed in tightly.

The groundlings were commoners who were also referred to as stinkards or penny-stinkers. The name groundlings comes from a line in Hamlet, first performed around 1600, where the character of Hamlet speaks of a performance "to split the ears of the groundlings". At the time, the word had entered the English language to mean a small type of fish with a gaping mouth—from the vantage point of the actor playing Hamlet, set on a stage raised around 5 feet (1.5 m) from the ground, the sea of upturned faces may have looked like wide-mouthed fish. They were known to misbehave and are commonly believed to have thrown food such as fruit and nuts at characters or actors they did not like, although there is no evidence of this.

In 1599, Thomas Platter mentioned the cost of admission at contemporary London theatres in his diary:

There are separate galleries and there one stands more comfortably and moreover can sit, but one pays more for it. Thus anyone who remains on the level standing pays only one English penny: but if he wants to sit, he is let in at a farther door, and there he gives another penny. If he desires to sit on a cushion in the most comfortable place of all, where he not only sees everything well, but can also be seen then he gives yet another English penny at another door. And in the pauses of the comedy food and drink are carried round amongst the people and one can thus refresh himself at his own cost.

== See also ==
- Parterre
- Promenade concert
