= Avezzano =

Avezzano Avezzàne (Neapolitan)
- Comune
- Città di Avezzano
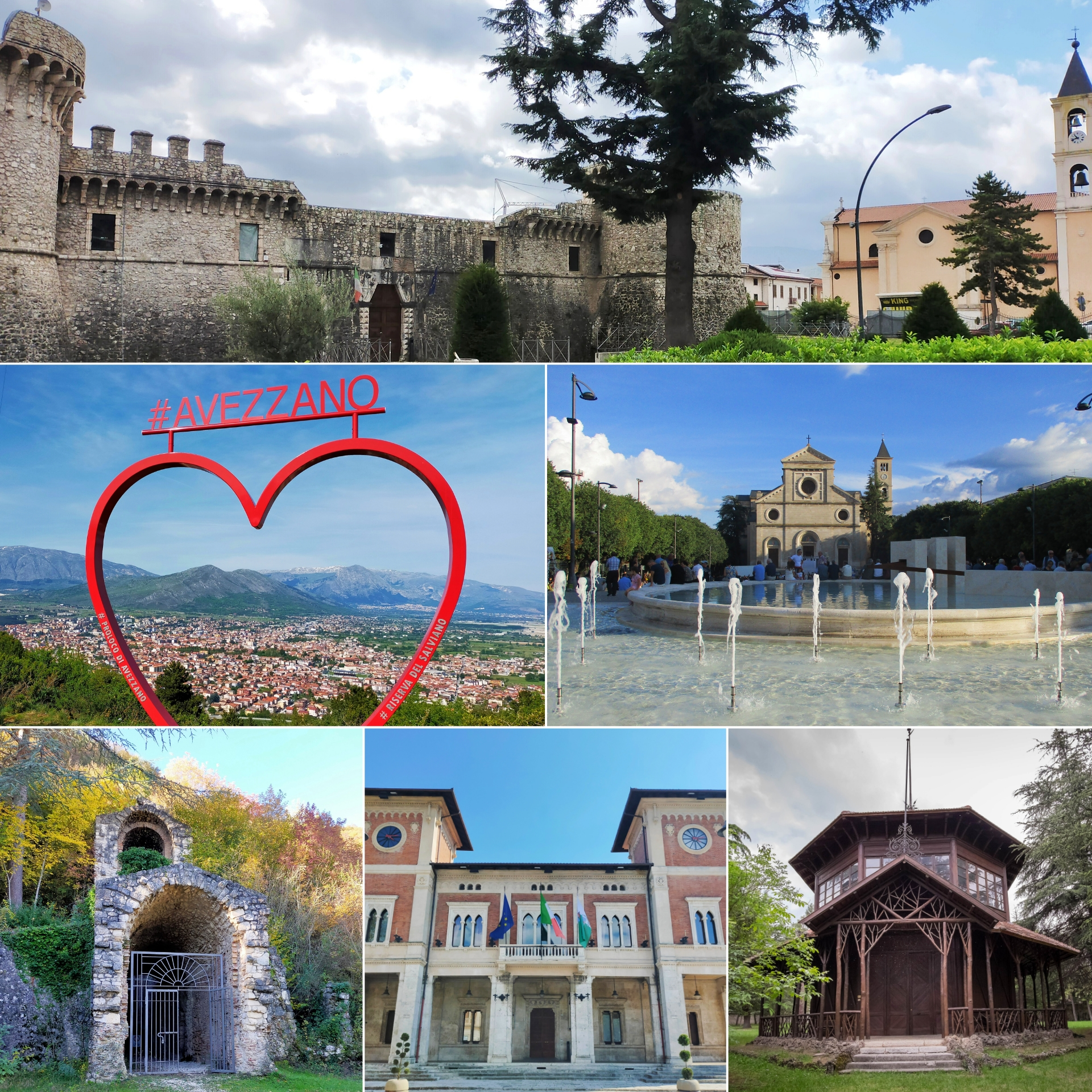
- Collage of images of Avezzano

- Flag Coat of arms

- Location within Italy Location within Abruzzo
- Coordinates: 42°02′28″N 13°26′23″E
- Country: Italy
- Region: Abruzzo
- Province: L'Aquila (AQ)
- Frazioni: Antrosano, Castelnuovo, Cese dei Marsi, Paterno, San Pelino, Caruscino, Borgo Incile, Borgo Via Nuova

Government
  - Mayor: Giovanni Di Pangrazio (Independent)

Area
  - Total: 104.08 km^{2} (40.19 sq mi)
- Elevation: 695 m (2,280 ft)

Population (31 August 2026)
  - Total: 41,498
  - Density: 398.71/km^{2} (1,032.7/sq mi)
- Demonym: Avezzanesi
- Time zone: UTC+1 (CET)
  - Summer (DST): UTC+2 (CEST)
- Postal code: 67051
- Dialing code: 0863
- Patron saint: Bartholomew the Apostle and Madonna di Pietraquaria
- Saint day: 24 August and 27 April

Avezzano (Italian: [avetˈtsaːno] or [avedˈdzaːno]; Marsicano: Avezzàne [avedˈdzɑːnə]) is a city and comune in the Abruzzo region, province of L'Aquila, Italy. It is the second most populous municipality in the province and the sixth in the region. It is the main commercial, industrial and agricultural centre of the Marsica area, with important high-tech industries and the Fucino Space Centre.

The city was destroyed by the earthquake of 1915. It was rebuilt after the 1944 Allied bombing. The city was decorated with the silver medal for civil merit, an award granted by the Italian Republic.

== History ==
=== Toponymy ===
There are different common etymologies for the name of the city: from "Avidianum" or "fundus Avidianus" which is derived from the noble Avidius ("Avidia gens") domiciled in the nearby ancient town of Alba Fucens; from "Ad Vettianum" which means a "to the Vettia family" ("Vettia gens") or for an unlikely hypothesis from "Ave Jane", an invocation to the Roman god Janus.

=== Earliest history ===
The presence of hunters dates back to the palaeolithic period about 18,000 to 14,000 years ago. There are several sites that bear witness to the presence of humans in prehistoric times, as in the Cave of Ciccio Felice located just south of Avezzano.

Traces of necropoleis dating to 8-5th centuries BC have emerged along the border between the Aequi and Marsi at Colle Sabulo, Cretaro-Brecciara and Valle Solegara.

=== Roman period ===
Avezzano was a rural area in the ager (state land) of Alba Fucens founded by Rome between 304-3 BC after the Roman conquest and colonisation of the territory of the Aequi bordering that of the Marsi.

Several Roman villas have been found in the area. The remains of the so-called Villa of Avezzano of the 2nd century BC are along the ancient via Tiburtina Valeria. The grandiose remains of a Roman villa on terraces can be seen at San Pelino with an aqueduct conduit upstream of the fountain with an opening on a beautiful wall in opus isodoma. Below the spring, a long terracing wall in opus cementicium is visible, 36 m long and preserved (for the first 8 m) to a height of 4.4 m: below is a curtain (2.60 m high) of blocks, molded in steps on the edges, in polygonal work 40 cm thick in six rows surmounted by a coating of opus reticulatum up to 1.8 m. On the slopes is a terrace wall about 5 m high with masonry 70 cm thick.

Other villas of considerable size are at nearby Paterno, one on terraces in Panciano and another in the modern town. The first has a terrace wall in polygonal work, a conduit from a spring and a vast area of pottery fragments along the country road which joins S. Pelino Vecchio with medieval Paterno. Lower down on the Via Valeria is the "villa of Paterno" in the fundus Paternianus (of which there is evidence from the Middle Ages with the curtis de Paterno and its church of Sanctae Mariae in Paterniano) discovered in 1971 which included a baths with a room paved in cocciopesto, another with a hypocaust, while in a third the furnace was visible.

The fundus Avidianus was an estate owned by the Avidii family as attested by local inscriptions and attributable to the II-I century BC which would have included a villa.

The first major settlements in this area began after drainage of Lake Fucino by the Tunnels of Claudius from 52 AD.

=== Roman villa of Avezzano ===
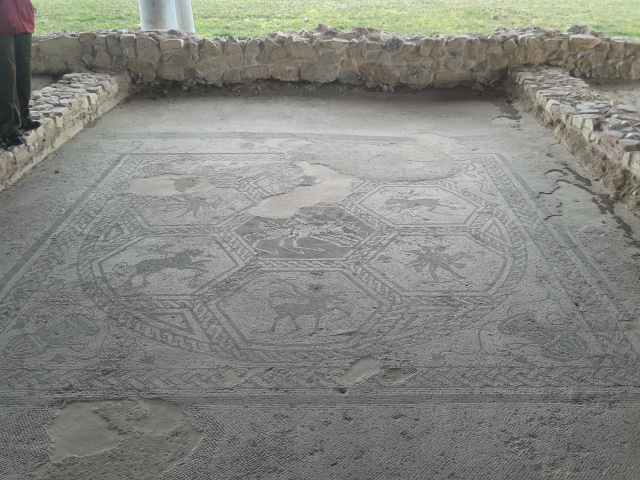
Roman Villa of Avezzano

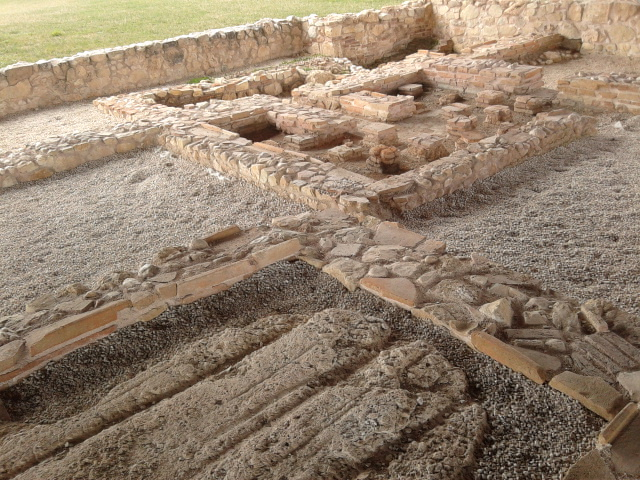
Roman Villa of Avezzano

The Roman villa rustica in the locality of Macerine opened to the public in 2008. It was built in the 2nd century BC over an area of about 3,000 m^{2} belonging to the ager publicus of Alba Fucens. The farm was used by the settlers primarily for agricultural crops for the needs of the colony of Alba Fucens. The colony became a thriving and populous commercial centre and was connected to the surrounding area by a road paved with cobblestones.

The entrance led into the atrium around which are rooms for the owner and servants. In the pars fructaria were cisterns and basins in which oil and wine were collected and grapes and olives were pressed.

A head of Apollo with hair of the Apollo Belvedere type of the Vatican dates from the period following the Social War (91–87 BC). The villa was enlarged over the centuries and enriched with private baths with hypocaust heating between the 2nd and 3rd century AD, with a mosaic floor with figurative motifs. The polychrome central panel represents the winged victory on a chariot pulled by two running horses.

Inhabited until the beginning of the sixth century AD, it was probably abandoned following an earthquake that shook the whole area. Graves dating to the 5th-6th century AD have come to light again near the perimeter of the villa, containing objects used for the decoration of the deceased and for daily use.

=== Middle Ages ===
In 591 in the area came under the control of Ariulf and the duchy of Spoleto. Charlemagne, after the mid-700s, donated Gastald of the Marsi and all the lands of the duchy to the papal states. So originated the county of the Marsi. In the Late Middle Ages the victory of Charles of Anjou led to the destruction of Albe and Pietraquaria whose people had sided in favor of Conradin, duke of Swabia, defeated after the battle of Tagliacozzo in 1268. In the fourteenth century in Avezzano ended the process of aggregation of the various villages that make up the urban center.

=== Early modern ===
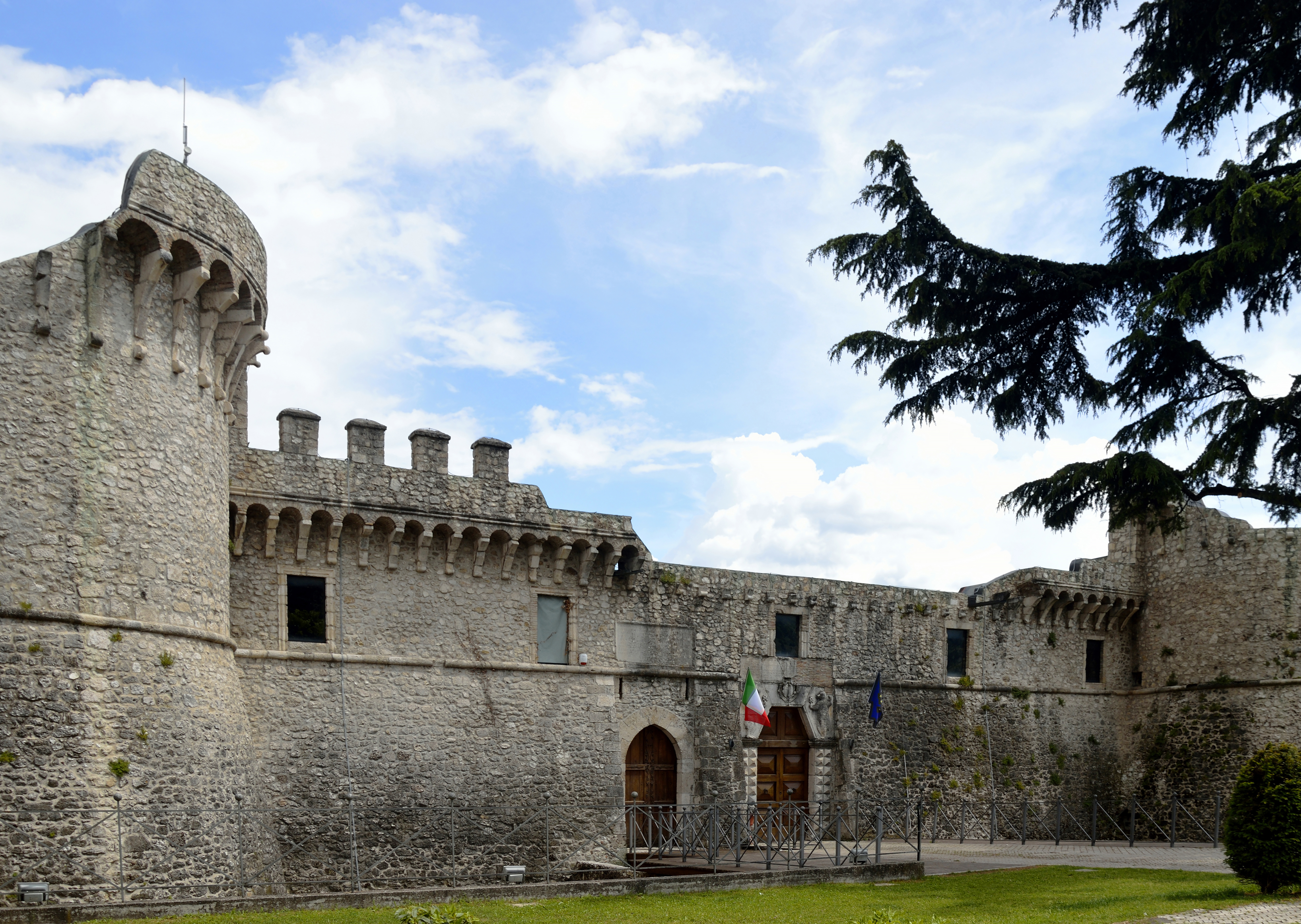
Orsini-Colonna castle

In the 15th century Avezzano was under Gentile Virginio Orsini, who built the castle in 1490. In the fifteenth century occurred the victory of the Colonna family over Orsini. Their lordship lasted about three centuries. The castle of Avezzano in 1565 was expanded by Marcantonio Colonna and was later converted into a fortified palace.

=== Late modern and contemporary ===
Avezzano once lay on the shores of the largest lake in peninsular Italy, Lake Fucino, which was drained in the late 19th century. After the draining of the lake, wide fields became available for cultivation and the area underwent terrific growth. It was completely destroyed by one of the worst recorded earthquakes in the history of Italy on the early morning of January 13, 1915, with only Palazzi's house and a wing of Orsini-Colonna castle spared. More than 30,000 people died. The town streets were then completely rebuilt along straight, parallel lines, with wide green areas and villas in the Liberty style.

During World War I and World War II, a concentration camp was located near the city, where foreign war prisoners were interned. During World War II, Avezzano was liberated by elements of the New Zealand Army (2nd New Zealand Division) on 10 June 1944.

== Geography ==
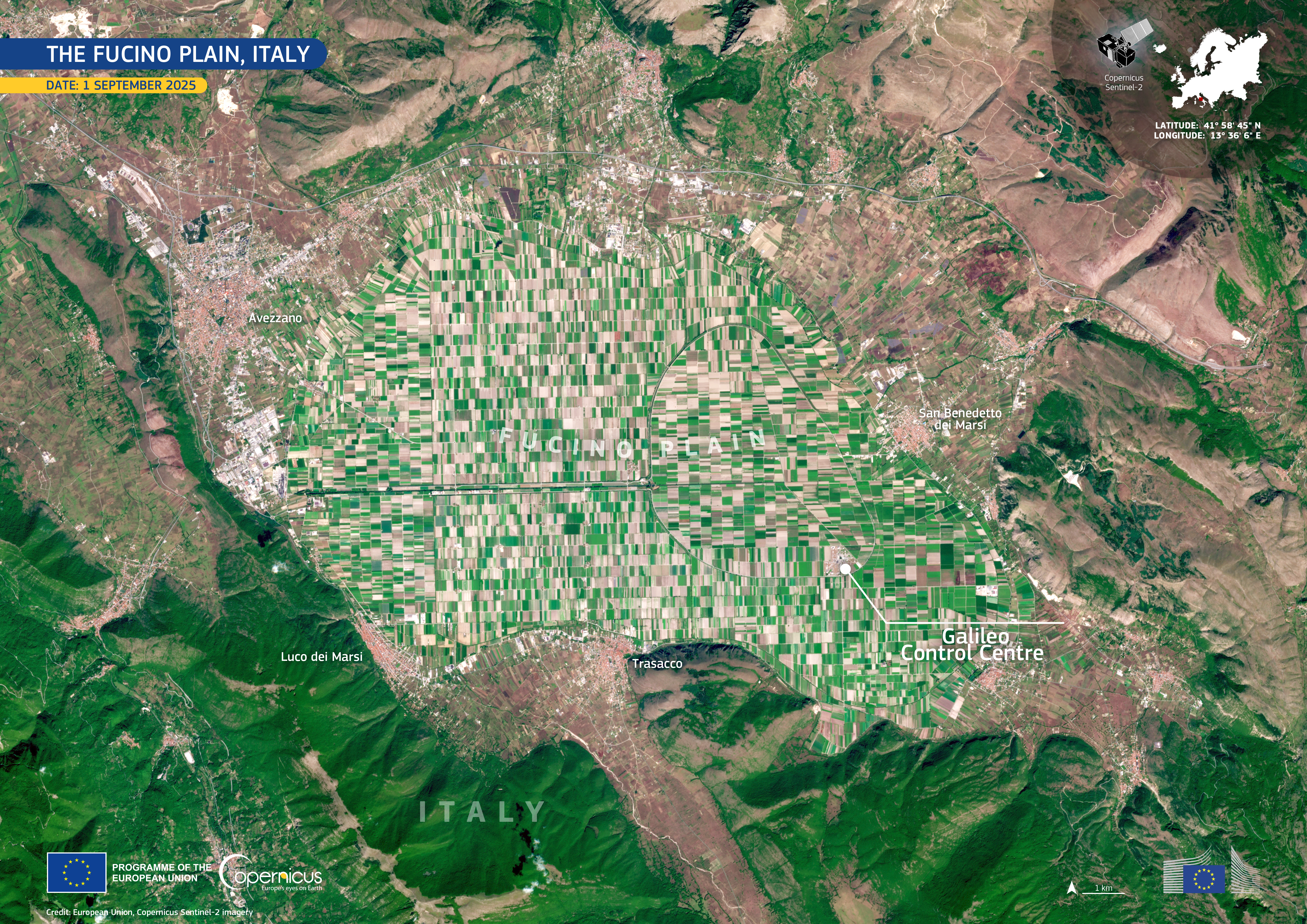
Avezzano and the Fucino Plain

The city is located north-west of the Fucino. It is dominated in the north by Monte Velino and west by Monte Salviano. Avezzano is considered "the city territory" of Marsica, Abruzzo sub-region that includes 37 municipalities, for a total of about 134,000 inhabitants. The city is located about 100 kilometers east of Rome, 110 km west of Pescara and 55 km south of L'Aquila.

=== Topography ===
The urban center of the old city revolves around the Castello Orsini-Colonna (''Orsini-Colonna Castle''). To the east the territory extends to the villages of San Pelino and Paterno. It is situated between 695 meters s.l.m. in the urban sector and 740 meters in the north, the land of which is a slight uphill slope to the north-northwest.

Neighbourhoods (alphabetical order): Barbazzano, Borgo Angizia, Borgo Pineta, Centro città, Cesolino, Chiusa Resta, Cupello, I Frati, La Pulcina, San Rocco, San Nicola, Sant'Andrea, Scalzagallo, Via Napoli.

=== Climate ===
Because of its geographical location, situated as it is in the former bed of the Fucino and surrounded by towering hills, Avezzano is characterized by a Mediterranean mountain climate. Based on climatic averages for the period 1951–2000 published by the agency ARSSA (Regione Abruzzo), and climatic averages related to thirty years of reference 1961–1990, the average temperature of the coldest month, January stood at +2,0 °C; that of the hottest month, August, +20.5 °C. In summer sometimes temperatures exceed 30 °C. The Climate classification is: Zone E, 2561 GR / G.

Climate data for Avezzano, elevation 708 m (2,323 ft), (1951–2000)
Month	Jan	Feb	Mar	Apr	May	Jun	Jul	Aug	Sep	Oct	Nov	Dec	Year
Record high °C (°F)	19.0 (66.2)	21.6 (70.9)	24.6 (76.3)	28.6 (83.5)	33.4 (92.1)	35.5 (95.9)	38.5 (101.3)	37.5 (99.5)	35.5 (95.9)	30.0 (86.0)	24.4 (75.9)	18.5 (65.3)	38.5 (101.3)
Mean daily maximum °C (°F)	7.3 (45.1)	8.8 (47.8)	12.3 (54.1)	15.7 (60.3)	20.4 (68.7)	24.4 (75.9)	28.0 (82.4)	28.3 (82.9)	24.0 (75.2)	18.8 (65.8)	12.5 (54.5)	8.2 (46.8)	17.4 (63.3)
Daily mean °C (°F)	2.9 (37.2)	4.1 (39.4)	6.9 (44.4)	10.0 (50.0)	14.3 (57.7)	17.9 (64.2)	20.9 (69.6)	21.1 (70.0)	17.6 (63.7)	13.1 (55.6)	7.8 (46.0)	4.1 (39.4)	11.7 (53.1)
Mean daily minimum °C (°F)	−1.5 (29.3)	−0.6 (30.9)	1.4 (34.5)	4.3 (39.7)	8.1 (46.6)	11.4 (52.5)	13.7 (56.7)	13.9 (57.0)	11.2 (52.2)	7.4 (45.3)	3.0 (37.4)	0.0 (32.0)	6.0 (42.8)
Record low °C (°F)	−21.0 (−5.8)	−15.6 (3.9)	−10.9 (12.4)	−7.0 (19.4)	−2.0 (28.4)	2.0 (35.6)	4.5 (40.1)	4.1 (39.4)	−1.5 (29.3)	−4.0 (24.8)	−10.5 (13.1)	−14.0 (6.8)	−21.0 (−5.8)
Average precipitation mm (inches)	66.3 (2.61)	71.4 (2.81)	61.1 (2.41)	60.0 (2.36)	51.0 (2.01)	44.0 (1.73)	29.8 (1.17)	37.5 (1.48)	57.2 (2.25)	77.6 (3.06)	110.2 (4.34)	99.3 (3.91)	765.4 (30.14)
Average precipitation days	7.8	8.3	8.4	8.7	7.9	6.4	4.1	4.5	6.0	7.8	9.2	9.7	88.8
Source: Regione Abruzzo

== Main sights ==
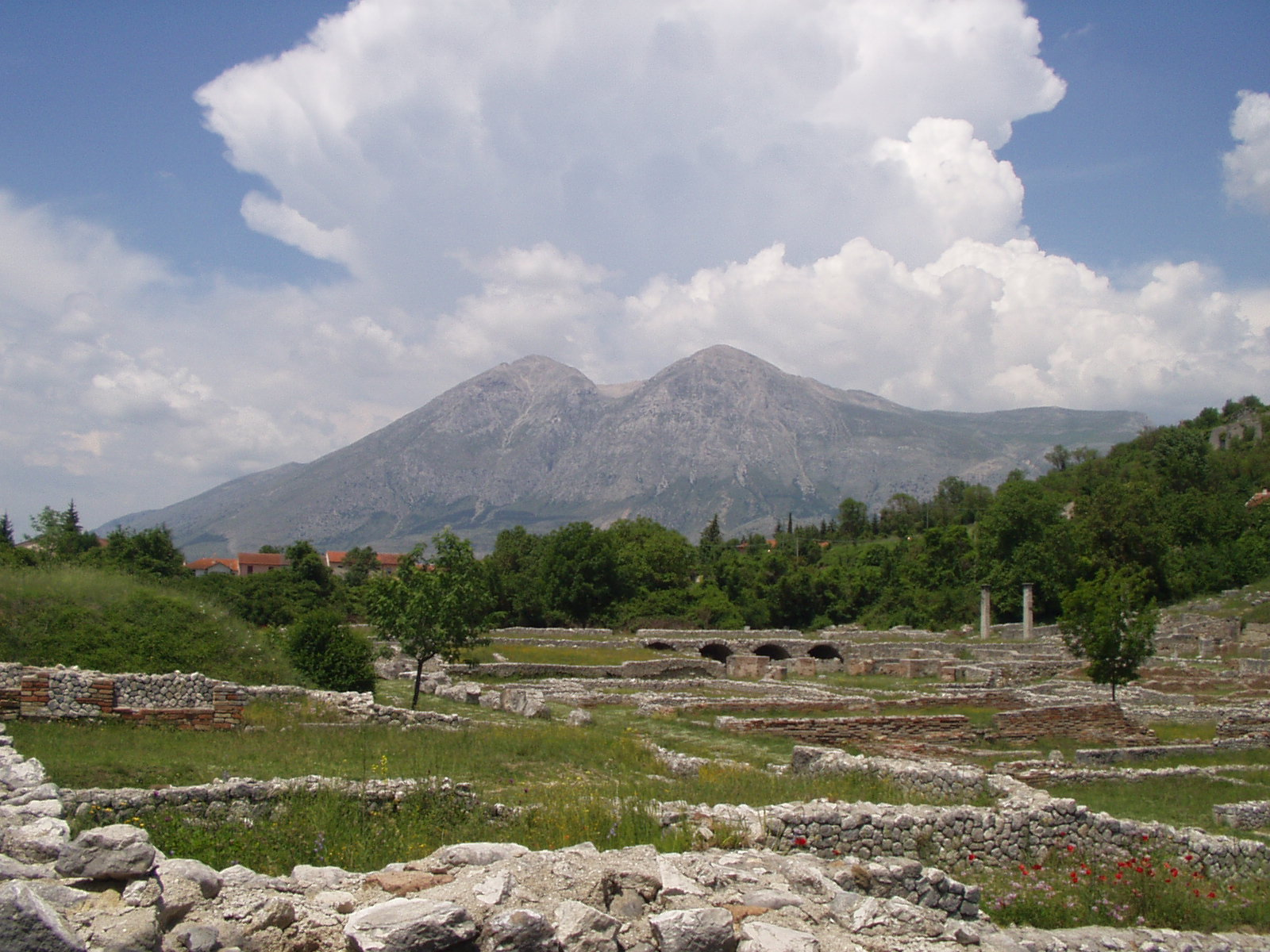
Alba Fucens background Monte Velino

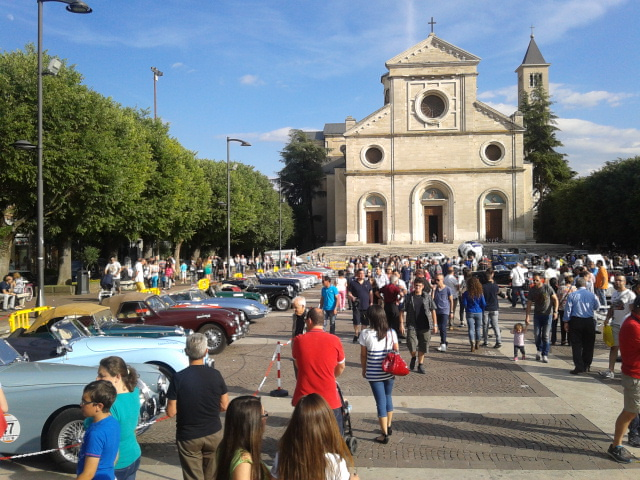
Risorgimento square

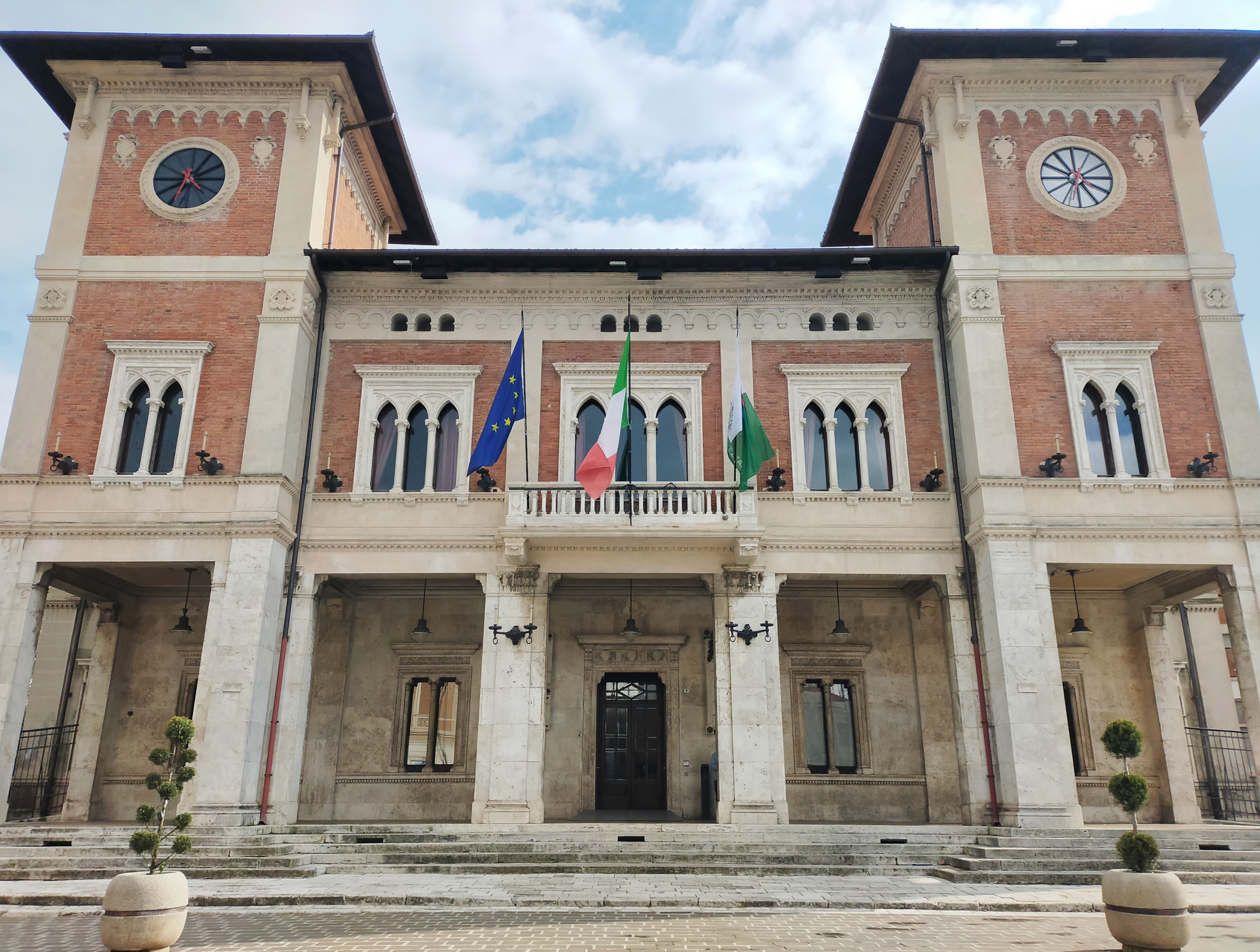
Avezzano Town Hall

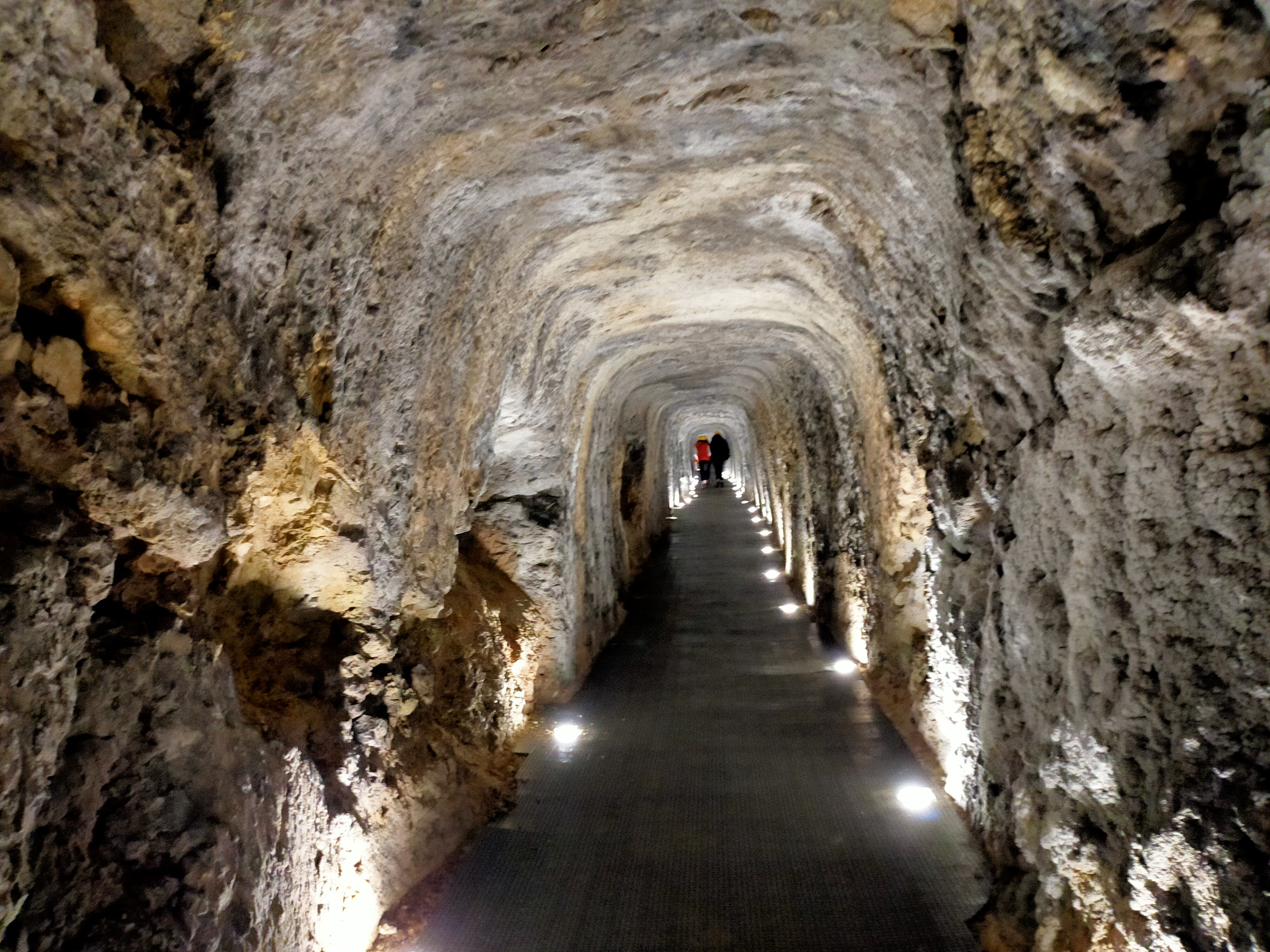
Tunnel of Claudius

The city, having been completely destroyed by the earthquake of 1915, has no monuments of particular interest as do other locations in the region of Abruzzo. However, you can see some important remains of its ancient history.

=== Orsini-Colonna Castle ===
The castle was built in 1490 by Gentile Virginio Orsini, who had it built around a pre-existing medieval tower of the twelfth century; it is square, with round towers at the angles. The castle project was probably led by the engineer Francesco di Giorgio Martini. In the sixteenth century the castle was expanded by the order of Marcantonio Colonna, becoming an elegant residence. Severely damaged by the earthquake of 1915, it was partially restored after 1990.

=== Tunnels of Claudius ===
The tunnels are located south of the city. They were built by the emperor Claudius between 41 and 52 AD by which the emperor made the first attempts at draining the huge Lake Fucino. To create the tunnels and the main gallery, 25,000 slaves were needed. They dug 32 wells and six tunnels. The lake was largely drained, but with the fall of the Roman Empire the tunnels were obstructed and the lake returned to its previous levels. Many centuries later, Alessandro Torlonia completed the work by finally draining Lake Fucino, building on the original project of the emperor Claudius and turning the land under the great lake into a fertile plain. In 1977, the tunnels were opened as an archaeological park.

=== Cathedral of San Bartolomeo ===
The Cathedral of St. Bartholomew was built in 1000 and documented in the thirteenth century. After its destruction as a result of the earthquake of 1915, it was rebuilt after 1940 in the new central square of Avezzano. The facade is neo-Renaissance travertine. The three portals are topped with mosaics depicting Christ and the two protectors of Avezzano, the Virgin Mary and St. Bartholomew. The church inside presents three large naves and a valuable organ placed in the church in 1955.

=== Sanctuary of the Madonna di Pietraquaria ===
The original church was destroyed by Charles I of Anjou after the battle of Tagliacozzo in 1268 and rebuilt a few centuries later. In 1915, it did not suffer serious damage and was home to many survivors of the quake.

=== Alba Fucens ===
7 kilometers north of the city is situated the Roman archaeological site of Alba Fucens. It was founded by Rome as a Latin colony between 304 and 303 BC in the territory of the Aequi, on the frontier of the Marsi, in a strategic position. It is on a hill just north of the Tiburtina-Valeria, the ancient road from Rome to the Adriatic regions. Excavations were carried out since 1949 by the University of Leuven in Belgium, led by professor Fernand De Visscher.

=== Riserva Naturale di Monte Salviano ===
The nature reserve, established in 1999, covers 722 hectares west of the town of Avezzano on Monte Salviano. It has a rich variety of plants and different animal species that characterize its fauna and flora. At the center of the reserve is located the Sanctuary of the Madonna of Pietraquaria surrounded by numerous trails frequented by sportsmen and nature lovers.

- Fucine Inlet
- Teatro dei Marsi
- Torlonia Palace
- Torlonia Square
- Church of San Giovanni
- Avezzano Town Hall
- Eclectic-neoclassical Courthouse

== Economy ==
=== Agriculture ===
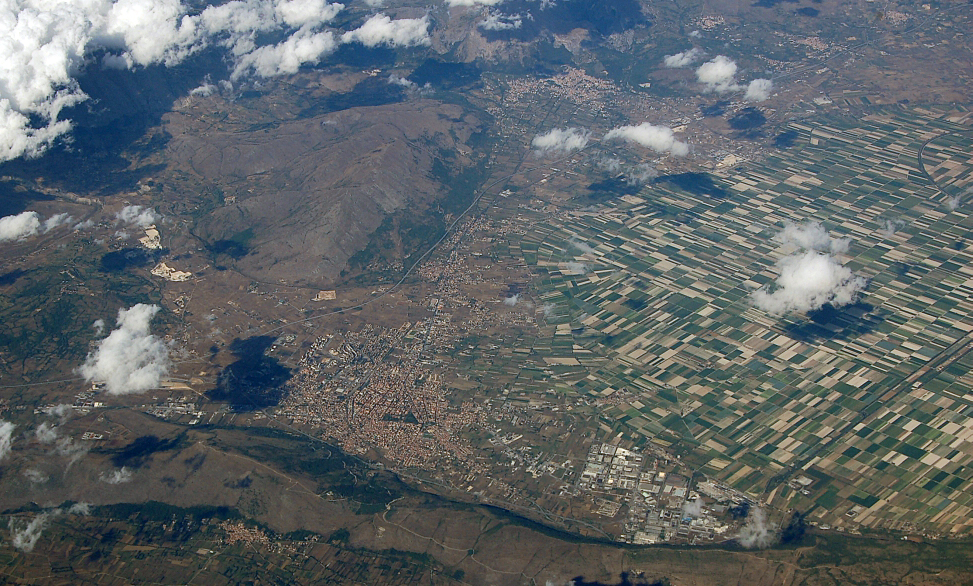
Aerial photo of Avezzano and Fucino plain

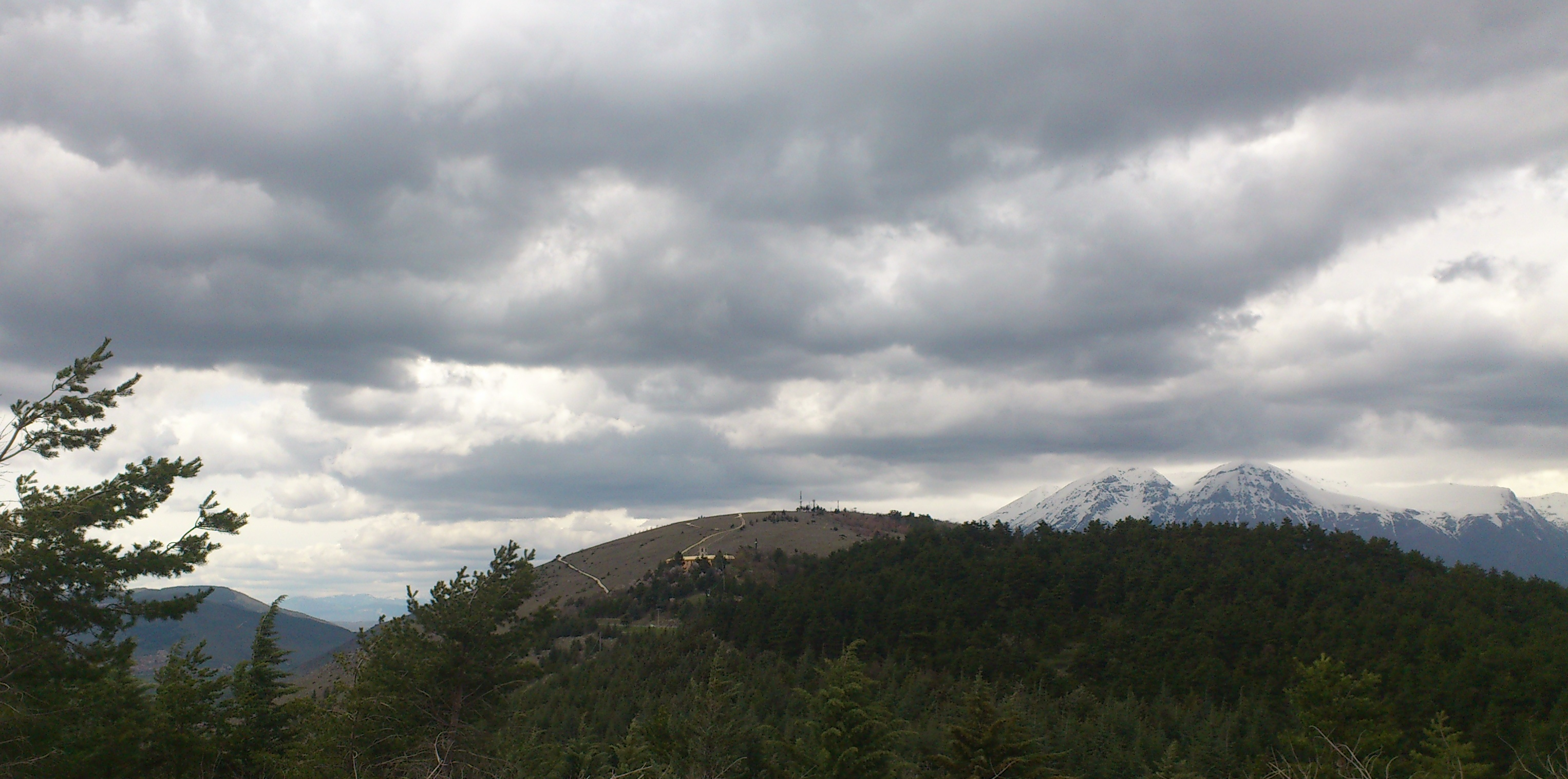
Photo from Monte Salviano

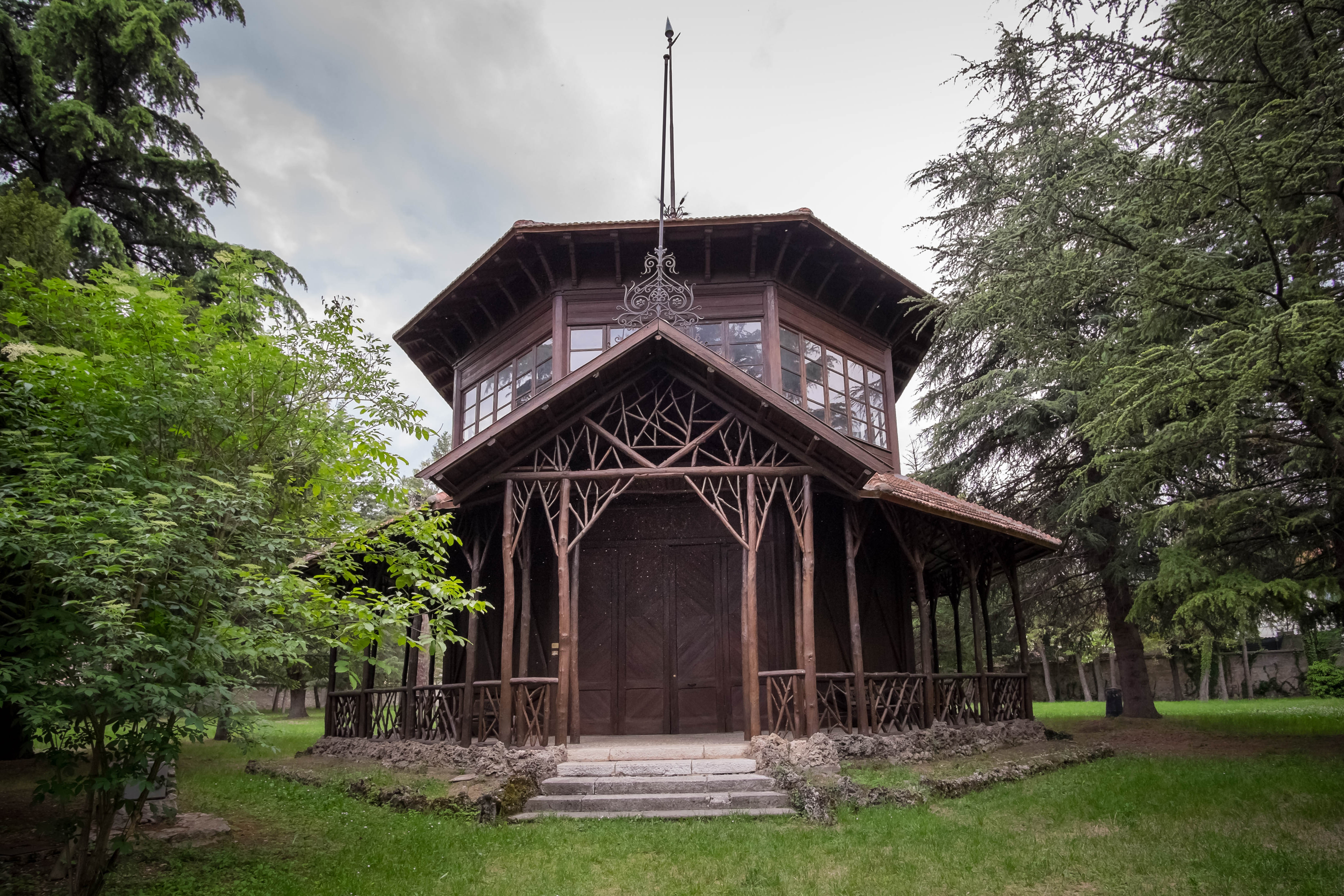
Pavilion Torlonia

Many farms in the plain of Fucino are distinguished by the quality of the vegetables. Particularly popular is the Fucino potato which obtained the recognition of the quality label "Protected Geographical Indication". Several qualities of vegetables: carrot highland Fucino (PGI), radishes, salads and all kinds of horticultural products. In Abruzzo, 25% of agricultural GDP comes from Fucino plain.

=== Industry ===
Built in the 1970s just outside the city in the direction of Luco dei Marsi, the industrial park includes numerous industrial and manufacturing enterprises and is the economic engine of the province. Among these are Micron Technology and L-Foundry, electronics giants engaged in highly specialized manufacturing. Around 1,600 workers are employed at the fabrication center "Innovation & Technology" in Avezzano. Also located here are Arab TV, Kidco, the Burgo group, FIAMM, Saes, Presider, Presafer and several other specialized firms. Nearby in the Fucino plain is located the Fucino Space Centre, one of the major global operators of satellite services.

=== Commerce ===
Commerce plays a very important role for the city in retail trade, digital service industries and traditional service industries. Large commercial areas are located on the Tiburtina Valeria street, between Roma street and Cappelle dei Marsi and along XX Settembre street, just outside the city. The so-called "natural shopping center" consists of the activities in the city center.

=== Tourism ===
Near Avezzano there are parks, valleys, cities and the natural environment of the Abruzzi mountains: National Park of Abruzzo, Lazio and Molise, Sirente-Velino Regional Park, Fucino plain, Monte Velino, Ovindoli, Tagliacozzo, Giovenco valley, Roveto valley and Cavaliere plain.

== Sports ==
The football squad is Avezzano Calcio who play at the Stadio dei Marsi-Sandro Cimarra. The rugby team is Avezzano Rugby. The athletics stadium is the Stadio dei Pini.

== Notable people ==
- Daniel Ciofani, football player
- Paola Concia, politician
- Felice Orlandi, actor
- Ada Gentile, pianist and composer
- Lino Guanciale, actor
- Gianni Letta, politician and journalist
- Mario Pescante, politician and sports manager
- Vito Taccone, cyclist

== International relations ==
Avezzano is twinned with:

- Ayacucho, Peru, for the sustainable development of protected areas near to urban areas
- Belén, Argentina, for cooperation and exchange of tourism, export and import food industry
- Câmpulung Moldovenesc, Romania, for cooperation and exchange of tourism
- Santa María, Argentina, for cooperation and exchange of tourism, export and import food industry

== See also ==
- Cathedral of San Bartolomeo
- Fucine Lake
- Marsica
- Orsini-Colonna Castle
- Roman Catholic Diocese of Avezzano
- Avezzano concentration camp

== Bibliography ==
- Febonio, Muzio (1678). Historiae Marsorum (in Latin). Monaco di Baviera: Biblioteca Pubblica Bavarese.
- Palmieri, Eliseo (2006). Avezzano, un secolo di immagini (in Italian). Pescara: Paolo de Siena editore.
