= Corfinio =

- Comune
- Comune di Corfinio
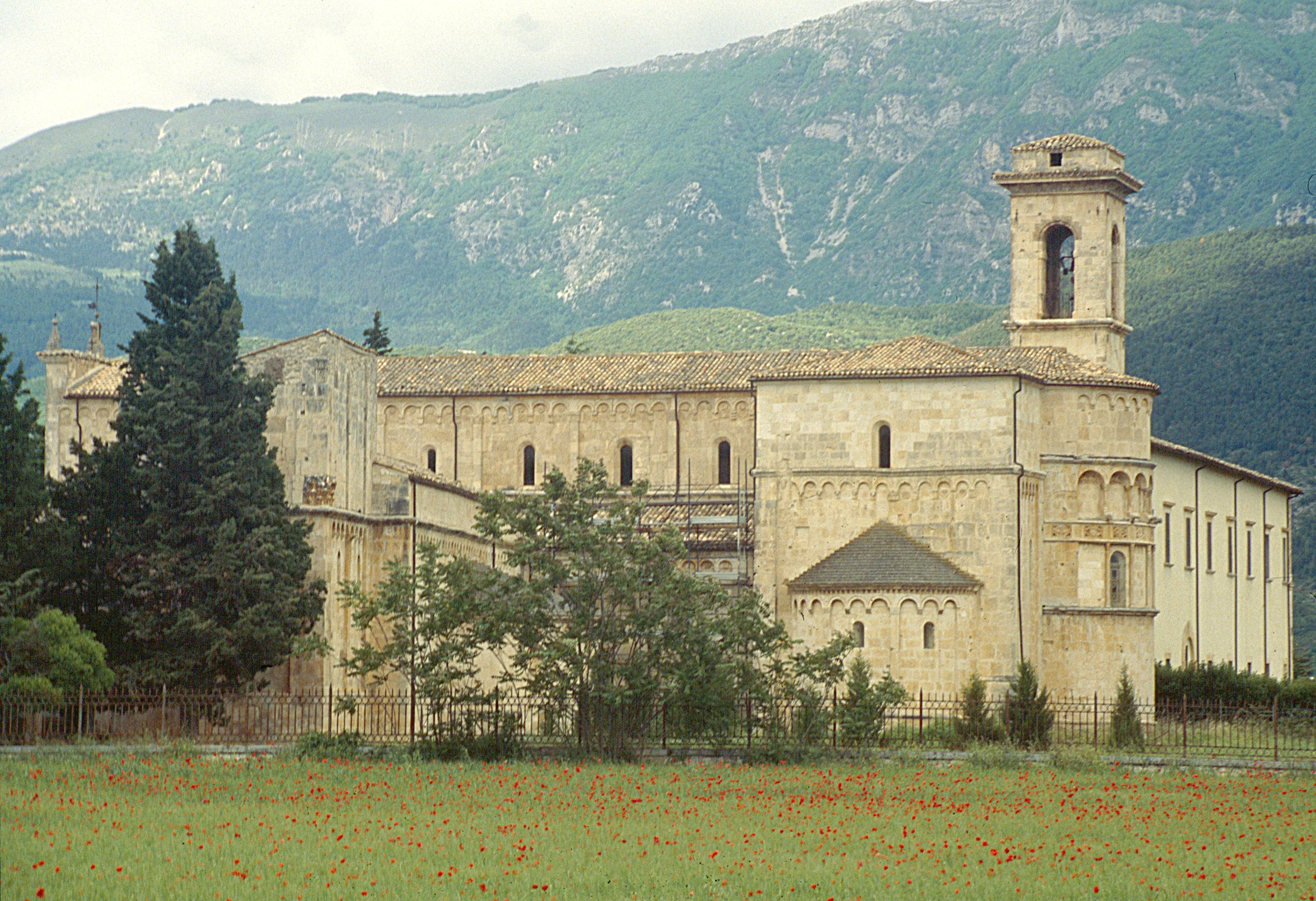
- Co-cathedral of San Pelino, in the diocese of Sulmona-Valva

- Location within Italy Location within Abruzzo
- Coordinates: 42°7′29″N 13°50′33″E
- Country: Italy
- Region: Abruzzo
- Province: L'Aquila (AQ)
  - Mayor: (Massimo Colangelo)

Area
  - Total: 18.19 km^{2} (7.02 sq mi)
- Elevation: 346 m (1,135 ft)

Population (31 December 2010)
  - Total: 1,067
  - Density: 58.66/km^{2} (151.9/sq mi)
- Demonym: Corfiniesi
- Time zone: UTC+1 (CET)
  - Summer (DST): UTC+2 (CEST)
- Postal code: 67030
- Dialing code: 0864
- Patron saint: St. Alexander
- Saint day: 3 May
- Website: Official website

Corfinio is a comune (municipality) and town in the province of L'Aquila, in the Italian region of Abruzzo.

In the Middle Ages, Roman Corfinium was known as Valva, and was the seat of a bishopric. This name is preserved in the name of the united diocese of Sulmona-Valva.

== See also ==
- Museo civico archeologico Antonio De Nino
