= Parterre (theater audience) =

Ground level of a theatre

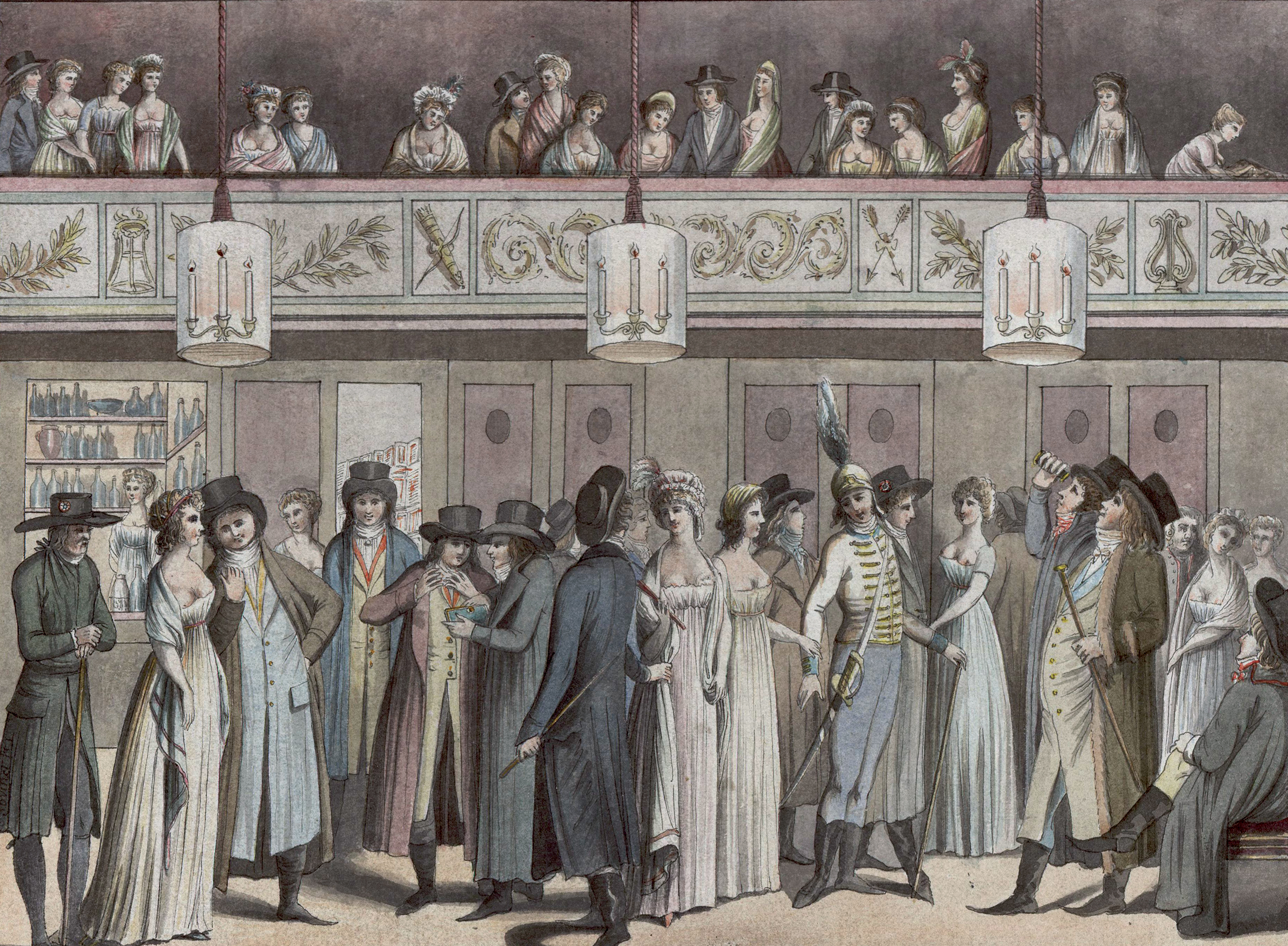
People socializing in the parterre of the Théâtre Montansier, Paris, late 18th century.

The word parterre comes from the French par and terre and literally translated means "on the ground". The main meaning of the word is the front section of a formal garden, but by the mid-17th century, it was also used to refer both to the ground level of a theatre where spectators stood to watch performances and to the group of spectators who occupied that space.

Although the word parterre originated in France, historians use the term interchangeably with its English equivalent, "the pit", to designate the same part of the audience in England, present-day Italy, and Austria. While parterre audiences differed in social status, size, inclusion of women, and seating arrangements, they shared the characteristic of being noisy, often boisterous, interactive audiences.

Today, historians are divided over whether or not parterre audiences deliberately challenged political authority, what role they played in constructing public opinion, and whether they contributed to the formation of a public sphere in early modern Europe.

== Audience ==
It is impossible to categorize parterre audiences as belonging exclusively to one social class, but historians agree that cheaper parterre tickets drew a proportionately higher number of lower-level professionals and commercial labourers, such as artisans, students, journalists, and lawyers, to the pit. However, the occupation, wealth, sex, and social standing of parterre spectators differed depending on geographical location.

Historians studying theater audiences in France have traditionally identified the parterre as the exclusive domain of lower-class males, with the exception of female prostitutes. More recently, scholars such as Jeffrey Ravel argue that parterre audiences were more socially heterogeneous than previously believed. For one, spectators who sat in the more expensive loges (balcony boxes) were free to meander into the parterre as they wished, and it was fashionable for younger well-off men to stand in the parterre. As well, despite restrictions against women entering the parterre, cross-dressing was not uncommon.

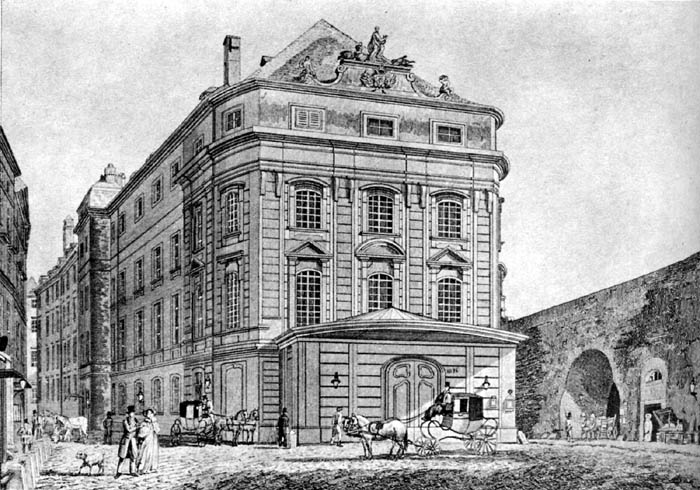
1830 illustration of Vienna's Kärntnertor theater.

England's parterre audiences differed from France because of the relatively high number of elites and "fashionable women" who socialized in the pit. Historian Jennifer Hall-Witt provides several possible explanations for the unique character of England's parterre. In English theaters some bench seats were available to parterre spectators, while theatergoers who could not find seats socialized in wide corridors known as fop-allies that ran down the sides and centre of the benches. Also in England, unlike in France or Austria, parterre tickets were not the cheapest; a galley ticket was less than the average half-guinea price of a parterre seat in a London theater. Ultimately, the pit in England was more socially respectable than elsewhere in Europe.

If separation between "nobles and commoners" in English or French theaters was informal, in Austrian theaters, the parterre formally differentiated between elites and non-elites. For instance; in 1748, Vienna's Kärntnertor theater partitioned a section of the standing parterre to create a second parterre behind the orchestra where only elites could sit.

== Practices ==
Parterre practices ranged from harmless gossiping to violent rioting. Talking, laughing, whistling, drunken brawls, and hissing, even dancing and singing was common behaviour. Prostitution was normal and individuals who ventured into the parterre could expect to be pick-pocketed, spied upon, and jostled about, in spite of the police or doormen who were charged with maintaining order. Yet, according to historian and musicologist James Johnson,

Few complained about the noise and bustle ... eighteenth-century audiences considered music little more than an agreeable ornament of a magnificent spectacle, in which they themselves played the principal part.

The antics of parterre audiences included mimicking performances, ogling at the women in the boxes, and making fun of people, as in one performance when "a few misfits in the parterre made sure the whole hall noticed one unlucky woman whose wig was taller than the door to her box." It is not surprising then, that for theatergoers the spectacle in the pit was the primary source of "endless amusement".

=== The parterre as critic ===
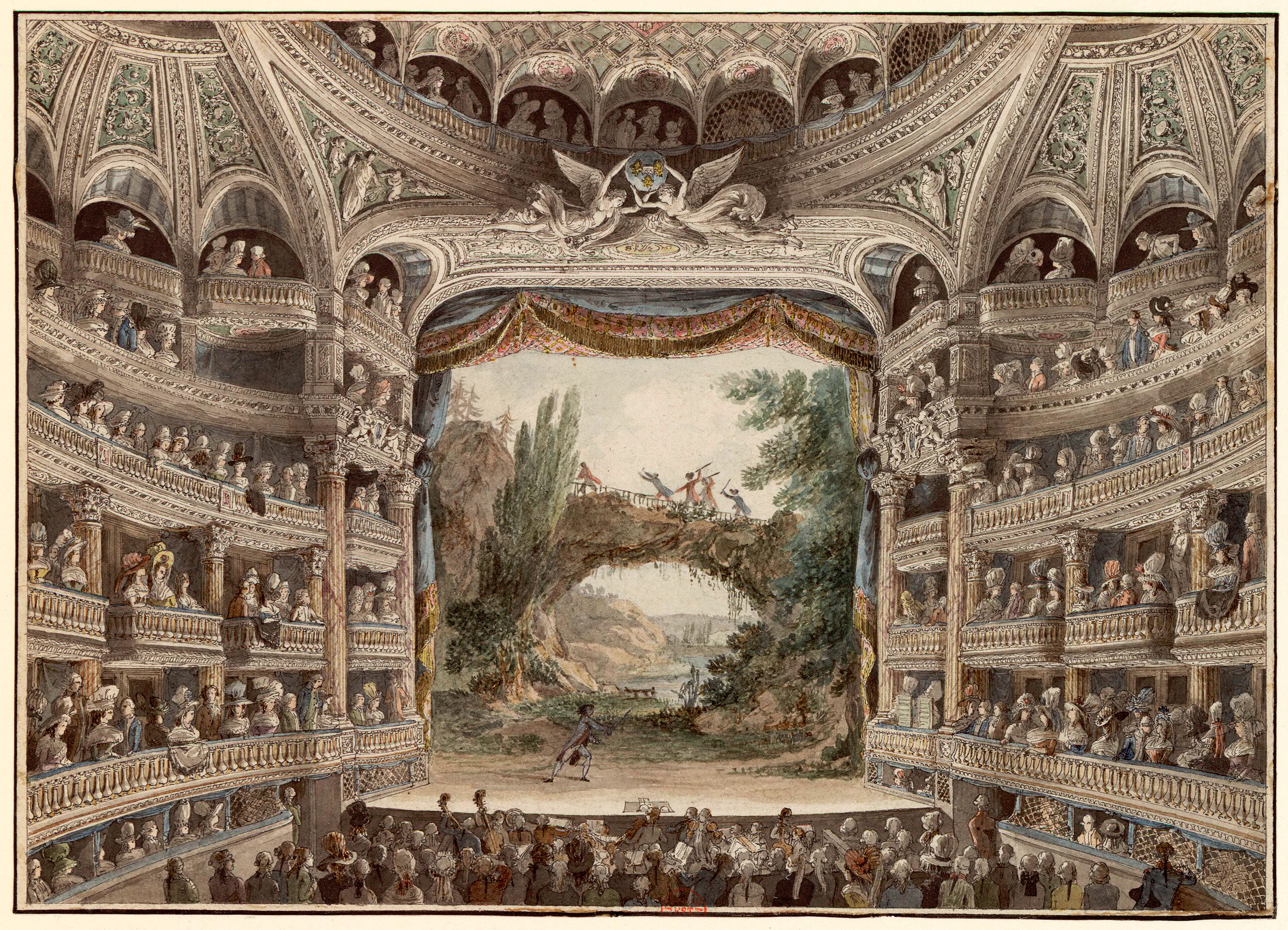
18th-century watercolour of the Salle Richelieu in Paris

Audience members in the parterre did not hesitate to approve, or censure, plays, performers, royal edicts, or offending individuals. For example, "it was in the parterre that Jean-Jacques Rousseau received "kicks in the rear: after his withering attack on French music". Responses could take less-intrusive forms of applause or booing, but the parterre was not always so kind. James Van Horn Melton writes that "audiences at London's Drury Lane Theater expressed their dissatisfaction by pelting the stage with oranges."

What influence did parterre audiences have? Though only informal critics, the size of the parterre, which ranged from around 500 to over 1000 spectators, meant their voice carried some weight with theater managers, whose commercial success depended partly on their patronage. On many occasions, for example, audience members from the parterre succeeded in forcing performers to switch programs mid-act, or repeat their favourite arias.

By the mid-18th century the word parterre acquired additional meaning as contemporaries increasingly identified the parterre as a "public judge", whose response to a performance could determine the success of a play or even the careers of actors, actresses, and playwrights. The wide range of 18th century sources defining the parterre as a judge, include personal letters, memoirs, and published periodicals, such as Joseph Addison and Richard Steele's The Spectator and The Tatler, which circulated in London's Coffeehouses. Historians frequently quote portions from the French philosopher and playwright, Jean-François Marmontel's entry for "parterre", published in the 1776 supplement to Denis Diderot and Jean le Rond d'Alembert's Encyclopédie, which declares, "the parterre is the best of all judges".

However, scholars caution against equating the parterre with "the public", especially since the latter term has changed meanings in the past two centuries. While parterre audiences were located at, or near, the bottom of the theater's social hierarchy, attending the theater was still an exclusive activity, limited mostly to the middle ranks of people and above. Thus, "the public" that was the parterre was distinct from "the people" who could not afford even the cheapest theater tickets.

=== Enforcing order ===
In the late 17th century, royal authorities in England, France, and regions in present-day Italy published numerous edicts threatening to discipline unruly behaviour, from interrupting performances to wearing hats, that were distributed as pamphlets or read aloud in theaters. These edicts where directed at the parterre, and many theater managers, performers, music critics, and individuals from the loges applauded such efforts to enforce order in the parterre. Disciplinary measures varied, but police records from the 18th century tell of police banning disruptive individuals after fights, and punishing unacceptable behaviour, such as defecating in the parterre, as well as guarding against petty crime, such as theft.

Yet, parterre behaviour continued largely unchanged. In Rome and Parma, efforts to regulate start times were ineffective and ignored, especially by "the notorious minor abbots who littered the parterre. Even a request from a bishop in England to lower the curtain before the start of the Sabbath at midnight could not prevent the pit from rioting and trashing the theater when the stage manager attempted to comply. Whether the inability of all efforts to impose order in the parterre reflects poor policing capabilities, the declining authority of the monarchy, or the deliberate resistance of the parterre is undecided.

== 19th-century changes ==
Between the late 18th and early 19th centuries there was a transformation in theater audiences from active participants to passive viewers, most noticeably in the parterre. While there is consensus among scholars that such a transformation occurred, how and why it occurred is highly contested.

=== Improved lighting and staging techniques ===
Towards the end of the 18th century, theater designs and lighting technology improved dramatically. Previously, the theaters' lighting came from individual candles surrounding the stage, small chandeliers hanging from the boxes, or larger chandeliers that illuminated the whole theater. The smoke from the candles often surrounded the stage with a cloud of haze, leading one historian to remark, "spectators sometimes saw one another more clearly than the performers". New lighting systems, such as the innovation of gaslights in England, reduced smoke and the invention of a system of pulleys to manipulate chandeliers enabled stage managers to direct the theater's primary light-source, and thus the audiences' gaze, towards the stage.

Changes in theater design complemented the new lighting. Early 17th century theater-houses, which were often converted tennis courts, were not conducive to creating the illusion of a single vantage point on the stage. Instead, the boxes often faced each other and an audience member in the parterre would be equally comfortable looking into the loges.

While historians agree that technological changes affected the attentiveness of parterre audiences, they also agree that these innovations alone do not account for silent audiences.

=== Seating arrangements ===
Historians specializing in the history of the parterre in France attribute the movement to install seats in playhouses with efforts to silence the unwieldy parterre. Seats were installed in the Comédie-Française in 1782 and in 1788 benches were installed in the Comédie-Italienne.

In 1777 Jean-François de La Harpe's proposal to install seats in the parterre sparked the debates between philosophes, playwrights, and officials about the desirability and motives behind seating the parterre. Marmontel insisted that plans to seat the parterre was really an imposition of the "aristocracy" on "theatrical democracy". The theater architect, Claude Nicolas Ledoux, saw the plans for seating in a more positive light, and wrote that "[T]he cabal will end, and we will judge authors more rationally once we have destroyed what is incorrectly called the enthusiasm of the parterre." Among those who favoured seating the parterre were stage managers and independent music critics, who linked the boisterous parterre to moral decline in the theatre and saw benches as a way to "tame" them. Regardless of whether individuals advocated for or against installing benches, what is consistent is the belief that seating would pacify the parterre. Other records indicate that the move was also prompted by the series of fires in theater-houses and the realization that packed parterre crowds were a possible fire hazard.

How silent was the seated parterre? Evidence shows that noise and disruptions continued throughout the first half of the 19th century. In England and in regions, such as Rome and Parma, partial seating had always been available for parterre audiences and did not guarantee calmer audiences. According to Martha Feldman, the theaters in Rome were "the wildest in Europe". However, for historians who identify the parterre as a site of public opinion, the debates over seating are significant because they provide evidence that disorder in the parterre was an act of disobedience against authorities and that the parterre was able to withstand attempts to pacify them and continued to act as arbiters of public opinion outside the realm of the monarchy.

=== New codes of polite behavior ===
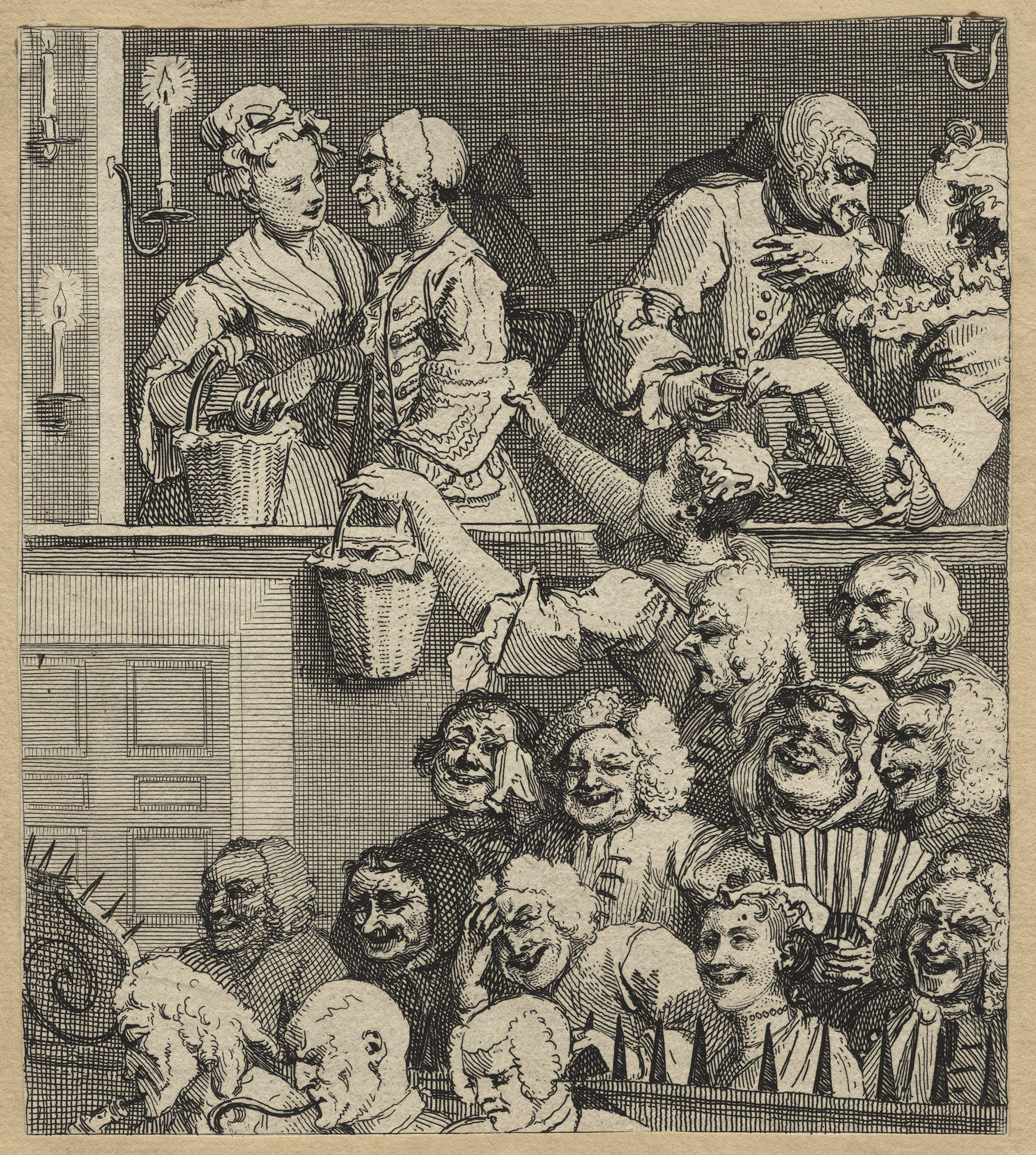
An etching by William Hogarth showing "The Laughing Audience" and a sour-faced critic, 1733.

Another explanation for the transformation of parterre audiences by the end of the 18th century is that changes in elite culture and in their behavior at the theater was mirrored by the parterre and the growing "bourgeois" audience whose values, according to some historians, included "politeness and emotional self-restraint".

Changing prescriptions for appropriate theater behavior found in conduct books reflect such a shift. Where it was once fashionable to arrive late and not pay too much attention to the performances, the new culture of politeness emphasized the importance of silence and attentiveness. Hall-Witt argues that the shift in elite behavior in theatres was prompted by changes to the theater's subscription to the loges, which meant that box seats would be available to non-elites. As a result, the social hierarchy that was mirrored in the seating arrangements of the theater were blurred. By adhering to a new etiquette of politeness that valued silence and attentiveness, elites could replace old methods of differentiation based on seating, with 'superior' behavior.

=== Changes in music ===
Scholars analyzing parterre audiences from a musicology perspective argue that changes in musical composition, illustrated by the works of composers such as Christoph Willibald Gluck, Wolfgang Amadeus Mozart and Ludwig van Beethoven, changed how spectators listened. James Johnson is foremost among the scholars who argue that new styles of music precipitated quieter audiences. In his work, Listening in Paris: A Cultural History, Johnson argues that in pre-19th century theaters, listening was superficial. The transformation to "engaged listening, and by extension, from talkative to silent audiences", paralleled new theories of music that required more attentive listening.

Other scholars writing on the listening habits of audiences in the 18th and 19th century are critical of Johnson's approach. William Weber writes that current "ideological construct[s] of taste and proper listening dates ... from the early nineteenth century" and cautions that approaching the 18th century listening habits from this perspective undermines their musical culture. In Weber's view, socializing and talking did not exclude listening.

== Historians' views on the parterre & the public sphere ==
Jürgen Habermas's influential work The Structural Transformation of the Public Sphere provides historians with the theoretical foundation for scholarship on the rise of a public sphere in Europe. For Habermas the public sphere constitutes a "realm of communication" that is open, egalitarian, rational, and critical and can be traced to the rise of the "bourgeois" in the 17th and 18th centuries. Significantly, for scholars interested in the history of the theater Habermas argues that the "realm of arts" served as training grounds for a critical public opinion, which later manifested itself in the realm of politics. Keith Baker's work, which builds on Habermas's model of the public sphere, provides historians of theater audiences with another useful framework. Baker's analysis of the 18th century rhetorical construction of "public opinion" as a tribunal and symbol of political culture is especially influential.

=== According to Jeffrey Ravel ===
Jeffrey Ravel's recent work, which is a cultural history of The Contested Parterre: Public Theatre and French Political Culture: 1680-1791, is the first scholarly study devoted to writing the history of the parterre. The significance of the parterre for Ravel is how it functioned as a critical segment of public opinion in an absolutist state, eventually becoming a symbol of political culture in France. Ravel writes that in France, public opinion had already emerged by the 1750s, decades before the date most historians associate with the emergence of public opinion. Ravel finds evidence of an emerging public opinion in the parterre audiences of the theater, which in his view was "one of the first forums in France where the subjects of the Bourbon Crown insisted on their place in French political culture".

Using 18th century police records, Ravel argues that disorderliness in the pit demonstrates the critical nature of parterre audiences, who were not merely responding to performances and the social activates around them, but were undermining the very authority of the court, who remained, at the same time, the patrons of France's "privileged" theaters, the Comédie-Française, Comédie-Italienne, and the Paris Opera. In other words, "the public theatre ... did not reproduce the forms of political and cultural authority generated at Versailles."

As part of his analysis, Ravel examines representations of the parterre in literature, from the 17th to 18th centuries. Ravel demonstrates how writers constructed an image of the parterre as a legitimate public critic, endowing it with an authority equivalent to that of the king. By the end of 18th century, the parterre was synonymous with the nation. Thomas Kaiser summarized the effect of this process well when he wrote, "the evolution of arts and letters ... created an international tribunal of public judgement that it did not control."

=== According to Paul Friedland ===
In 2002 Paul Friedland published his work Political Actors: Representative Bodies and Theatricality in the Age of the French Revolution. Friedland disagrees with the "equation of the theatrical parterre with the nation" and with the way historians have "imbued" the parterre "with political culture". More than Ravel, Friedland is highly critical of Habermas and writes that for historians of the theater the implications of Habermas's model of the "public sphere" is "a reading of public opinion in the arts as if it were veiled political metaphor". "Theater", according to Friedland, "was not 'really' about politics any more than politics was 'really' about theater". What theater and politics did share was the "same underlying representative process".

18th century transformations in modes of political representation paralleled new theories of representation on the stage. Friedland writes that Antoine-François Riccoboni's L'art du Theatre marked the shift in theories of theatrical representation, from a system where the performers' "representation of a character necessarily entailed the actor's actual physical experience of the character's emotions", to a new system of representation where the actors performance was not 'true' but resembled what was true. In Friedland's words "... this new, artificial system depended, not on the actors' belief – or, as we tend to refer to it today, on the spectator's suspension of disbelief". At the same time, as modes of representation shifted in the world of theater, parallels emerged in the representation of the king. In an absolutist monarchy the king was the source of his own legitimacy, whereas under the new system of representation the king's legitimacy came from the critical judgement of the individual.

Thus, Friedland's examination of theater audiences and the political sphere does not see parterre audiences as the basis of political culture in France. Rather the "participatory" parterre audiences of the 18th century reflected a particular mode of representation, just as the possibility of shaping a modern silent spectator emerged with new conditions of theatergoing that were dictated by changes in theories of representation.

== See also ==
- Groundling
- Theater (structure)
- Public sphere
- Querelle des Bouffons

== Bibliography ==
- Feldman, Martha. Opera And Sovereignty. Chicago: University of Chicago, 2007.
- Friedland, Paul. Political Actors: Representative Bodies and Theatricality in the Age of the French Revolution. Ithaca: Cornell University Press, 2002.
- Hall-Witt, Jennifer. Fashionable Acts: Opera and Elite Culture in London: 1780-1880. Durham: University of New Hampshire Press, 2007.
- Johnson, James. Listening in Paris: A Cultural History. Berkeley: University of California Press, 1995.
- Kaiser, Thomas E. "Rhetoric in the Service of the King: The Abbe Dubos and the Concept of Public Judgment". Eighteenth-Century Studies 23 (1989–1990):182–199.
- Lough, John. Paris Theater Audiences In the Seventeenth And Eighteenth Centuries. London: Oxford University Press, 1957.
- Mittman, Barbara G. Spectators on the Paris Stage in the Seventeenth and Eighteenth Centuries. Michigan, UMI Research Press, 1984.
- Ravel, Jeffrey S. The Contested Parterre: Public Theater and French Political Culture: 1680-1791. Ithaca: Cornell University Press, 1999.
- Roche, Daniel. "Who were 'le peuple'? Chapter 2 in The People of Paris. Translated by Marie Evans. Berg Publishers Limited, 1987.
- Van Horn Melton, James. The Rise of the Public in Enlightenment Europe. Cambridge: Cambridge University Press, 2001.
- Van Horn Melton, James. "School, Stage, Salon: Musical Cultures in Haydn's Vienna". The Journal of Modern History 76 (2004): 251–279.
- Weber, William. "Did People Listen in the 18th Century?" Early Music 25 (1997): 678–691.
- Weber, William. "Learned and General Musical Taste in Eighteenth-Century France". Past & Present 89 (1980): 58–85.
- Weber, William. "Concepts and Contexts". Chapter 1 in The Great Transformation of Musical Taste. Cambridge: Cambridge University Press, 2008.
