= San Pelino =

Coordinates: 42.051667°N 13.462222°E

- Frazione
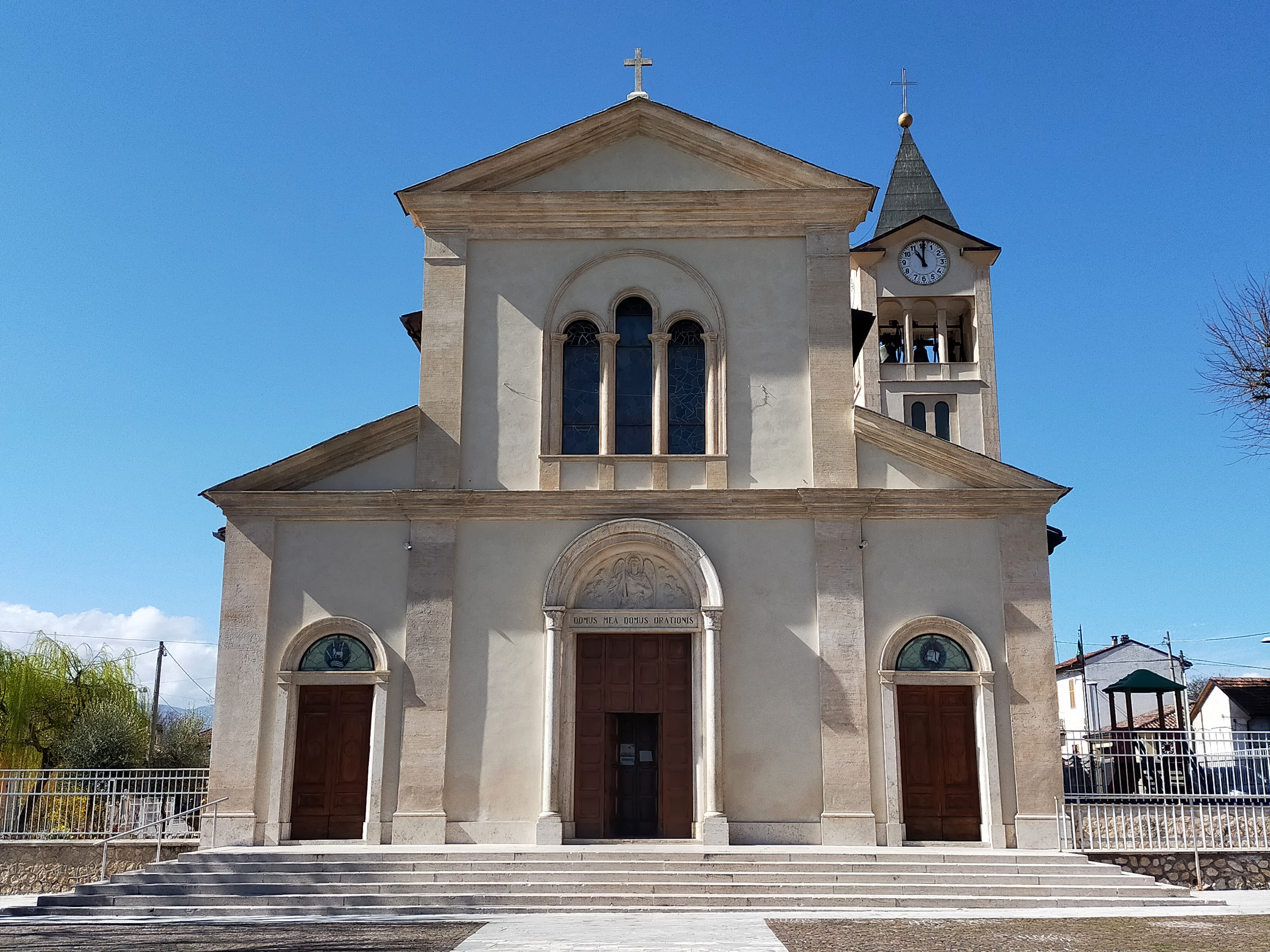
- Church of St Michael the Archangel in San Pelino
- Interactive map of San Pelino
- Country: Italy
- Region: Abruzzo
- Province: L'Aquila
- Commune: Avezzano
- Time zone: UTC+1 (CET)
  - Summer (DST): UTC+2 (CEST)

The frazione San Pelino is a medieval town in the Avezzano comune. It lies within the province of L'Aquila, Abruzzo region, in the Apennine Mountain Range of central Italy..The population is about 2,000.
