= Orsini-Colonna Castle =

Castle in Avezzano, Italy

Castello Orsini-Colonna
- Avezzano
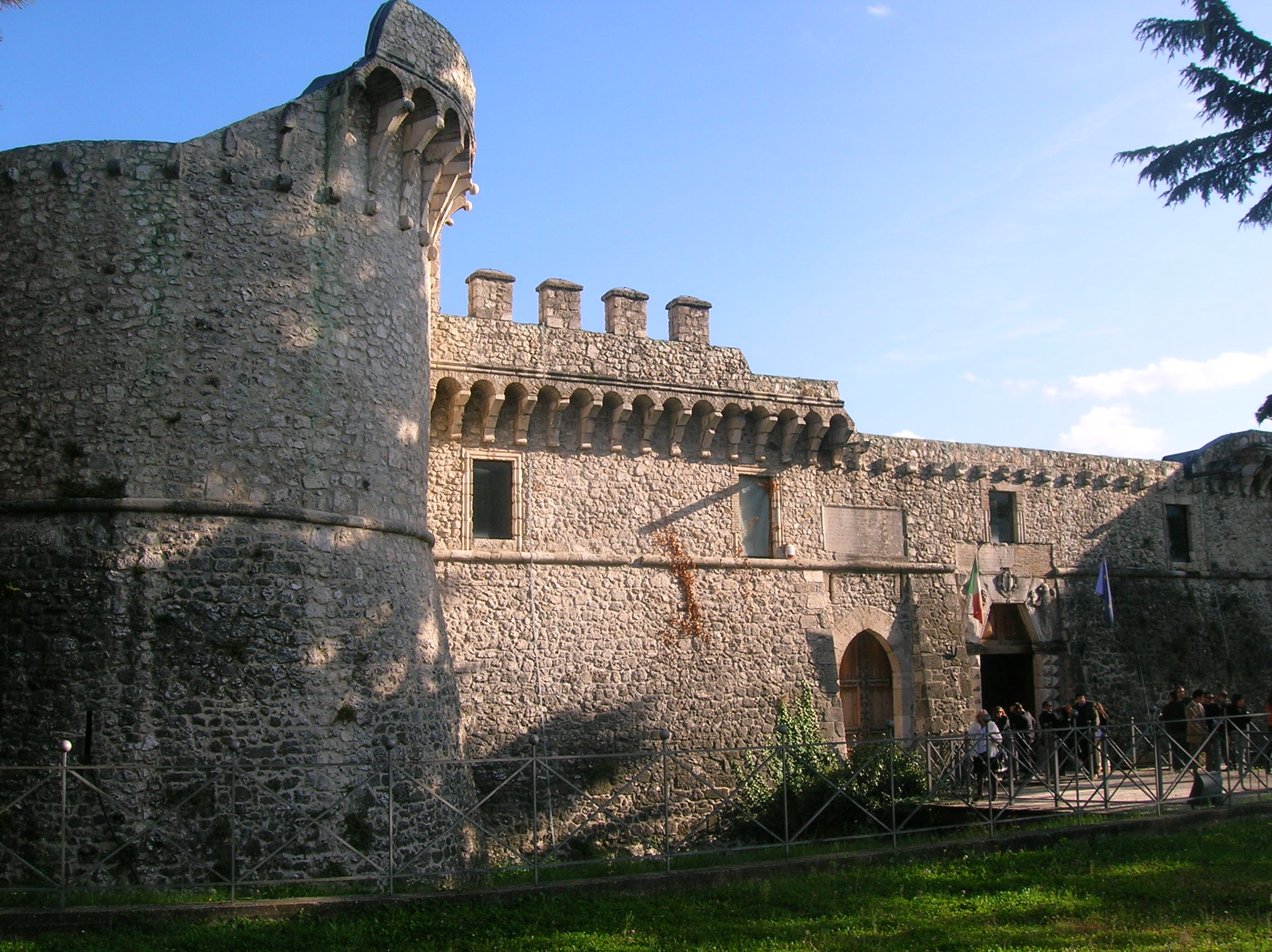
- Castello Orsini-Colonna in Avezzano

Site information
- Type: Castle

Location
- Coordinates: 42.027591°N 13.425926°E

Site history
- Built: 1490

The Orsini-Colonna castle (Italian Castello Orsini-Colonna) is a castle in Avezzano, Province of L'Aquila (Abruzzo).

== History ==
Castello Orsini was constructed in 1490 by Virginio Orsini and, in 1565, it was adapted by Marcantonio Colonna in fortified residence. In 1915 it was deeply damaged by an earthquake. Following its restoration, now it is used as a picture gallery and multifunction space.

== Architecture ==
The squared building is protected by four circular towers at each corner. A circular tower was also in the middle of the internal courtyard, now demolished. The castle had a moat and a drawbridge. The current main entrance was built by the Colonna family to celebrate the battle of Lepanto.
