= Madonna di Pietraquaria =

Italian Marian title

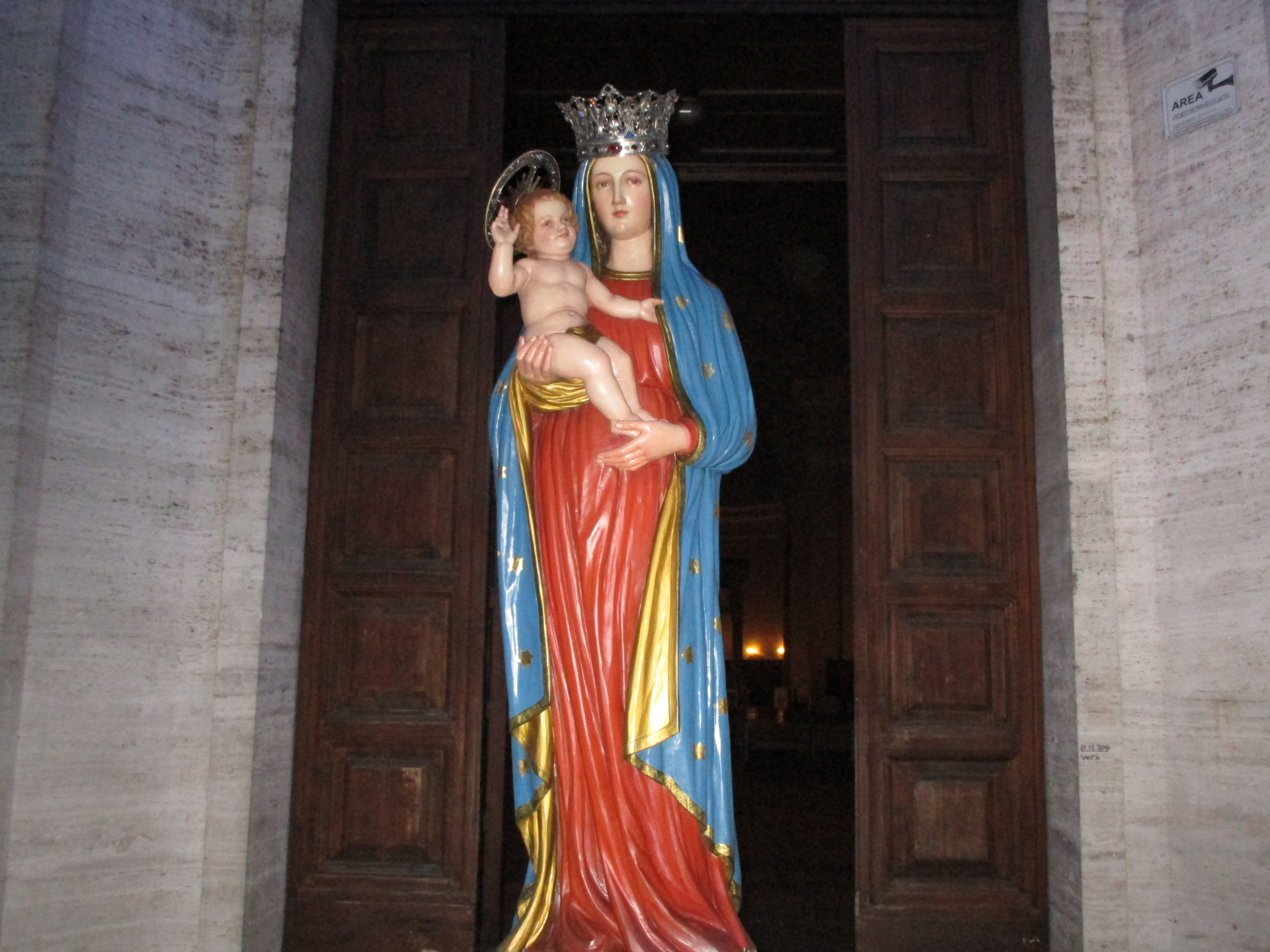
- Statue of the Madonna di Pietraquaria
- Also called: Feast of the Madonna di Pietraquaria
- Observed by: Avezzano, Abruzzo, Italy
- Significance: local religious feast
- Observances: devotion to the Madonna di Pietraquaria
- Date: 27 April
- Next time: 27 April 2027
- Frequency: annual

Madonna di Pietraquaria (Italian for Madonna of Pietraquaria) is one of the titles by which the Holy Virgin Mary is venerated as the Patroness of the city of Avezzano, in Abruzzo, Italy. On 1 January 1978, Maria Santissima di Pietraquaria ("Most Holy Mary of Pietraquaria") was proclaimed the patroness saint of the city of Avezzano. The Virgin Mary is celebrated with events and religious rites between 25 and 27 April.

Pope Gregory XVI granted a canonical coronation towards the venerated image on 16 September 1838.

== History ==
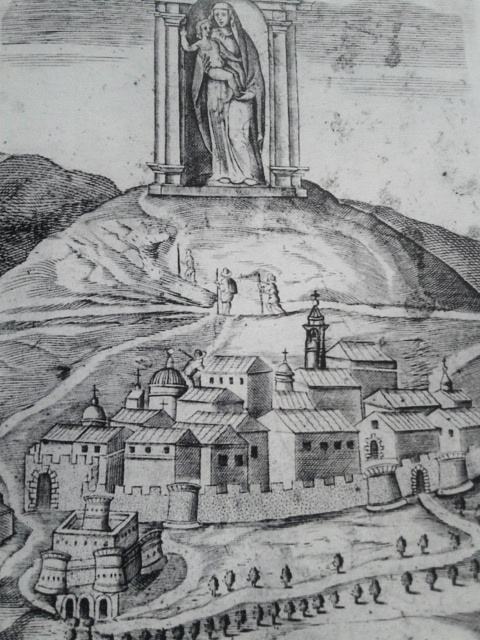
Madonna di Pietraquaria protecting the city of Avezzano (serigraphy by Fedele De Bernardinis, 1791)

=== Origins ===
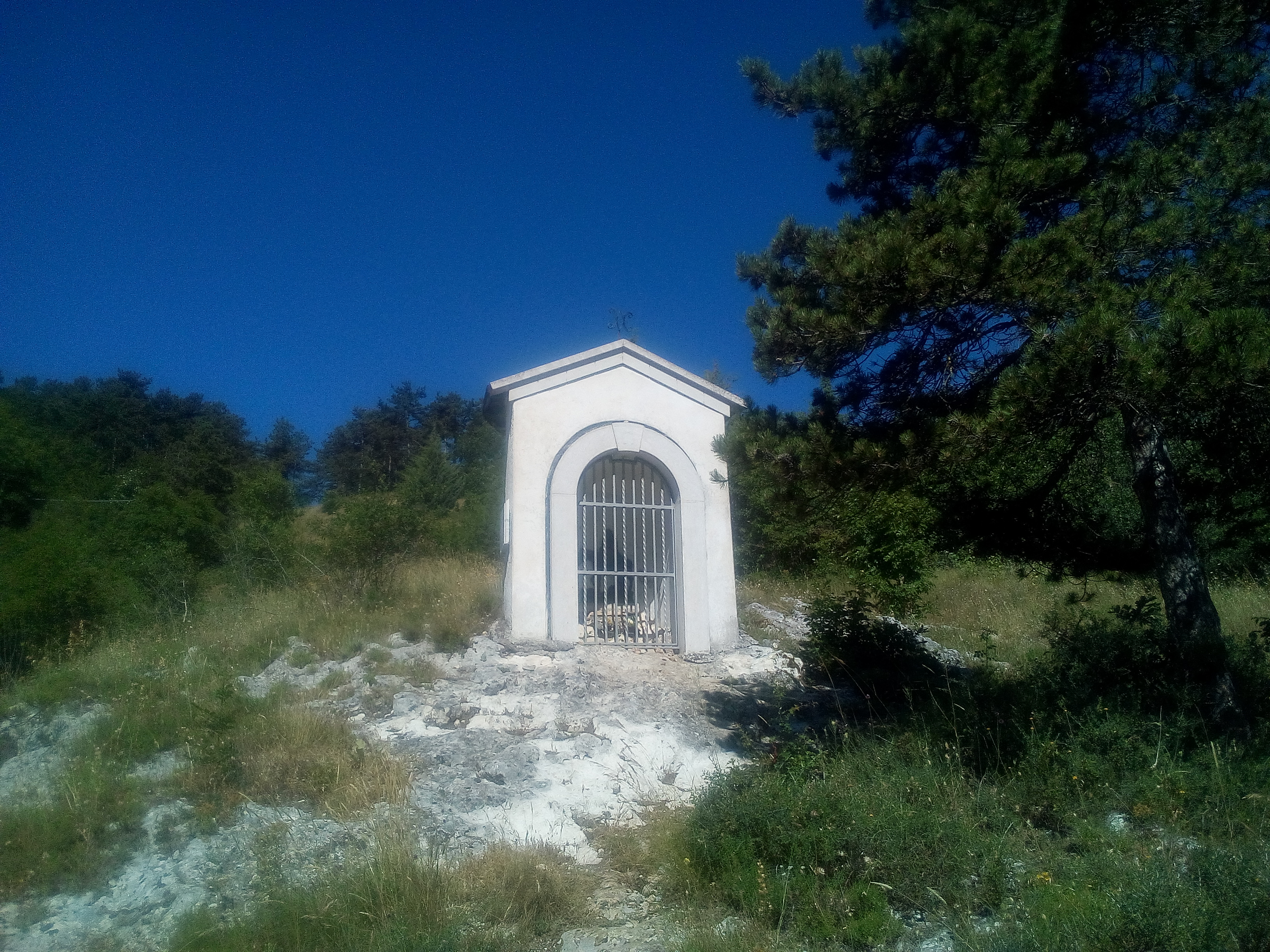
The chapel erected in the place where the miraculous encounter between the Madonna and the deaf-mute shepherd

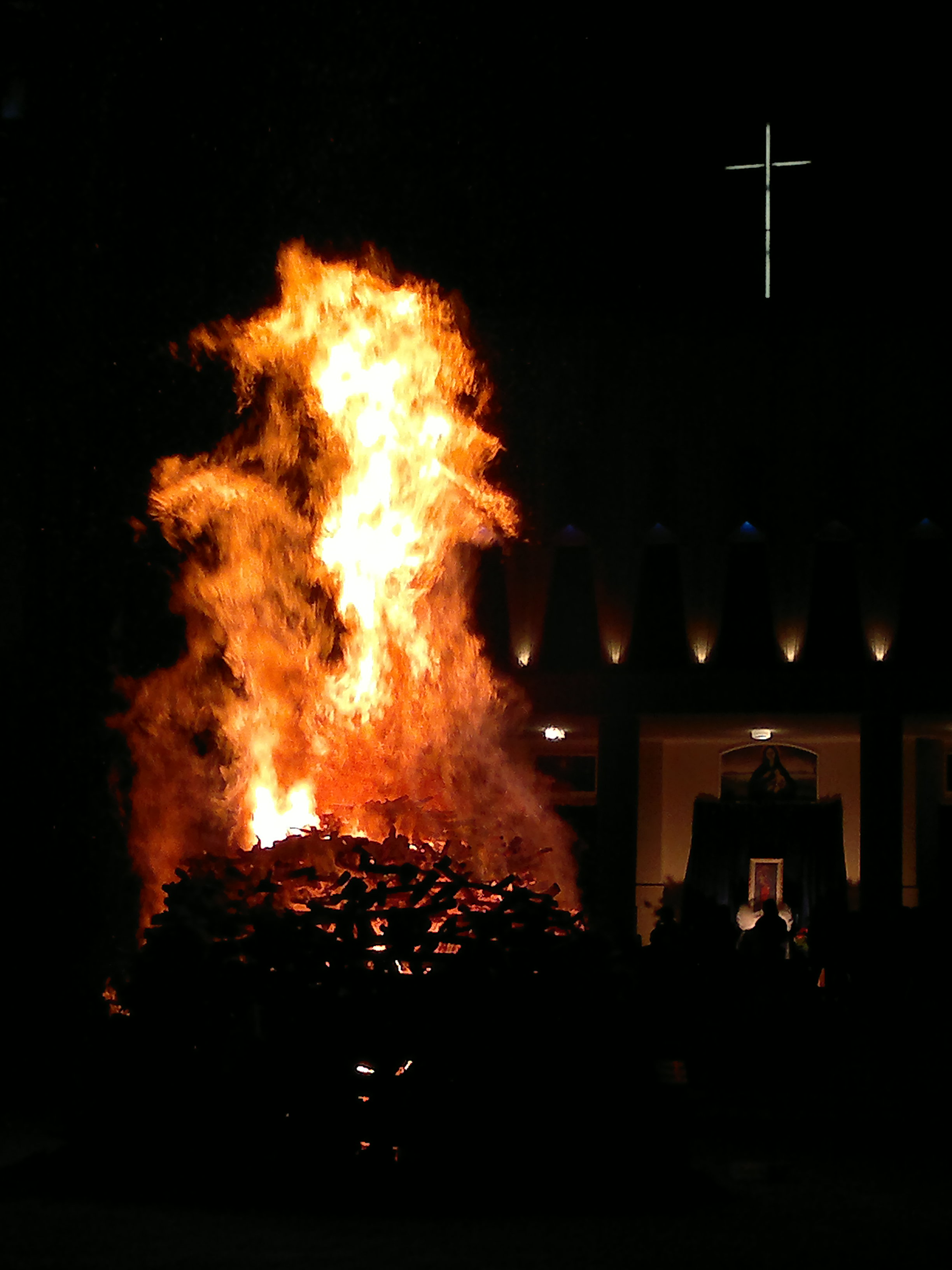
Focaraccio in honour of the Madonna di Pietraquaria

The cult is related to the presence of the medieval town of Pietra Aquaria (literally "water stone") on the top of Mount Salviano since the 10th century. Here, as attested by Pope Clement III's 12th century bull, there were three small religious buildings: Saint Peter, Saint John and Saint Mary. In this church a painting depicting the Virgin with Child was located.

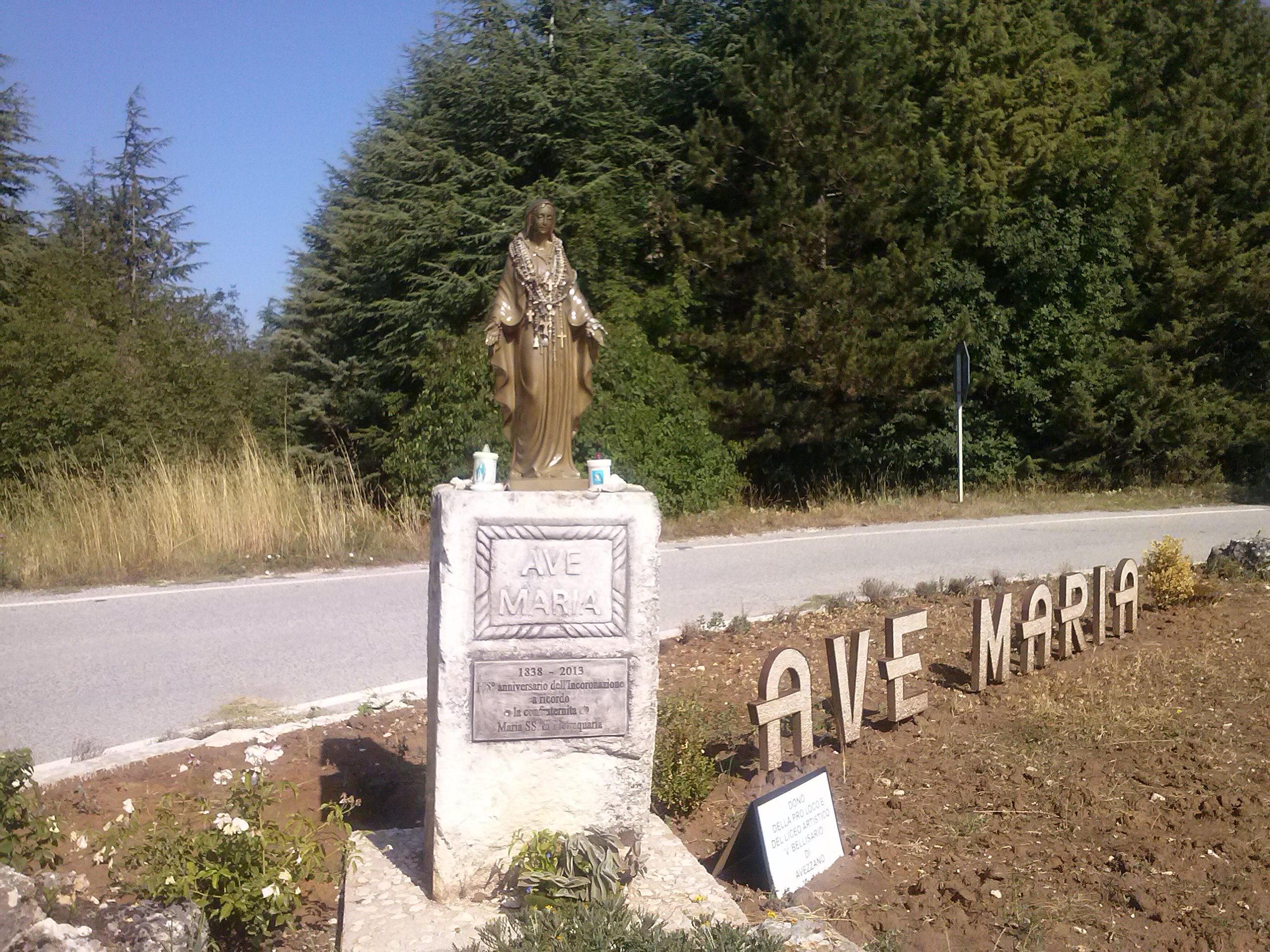
Statue of the Madonna and plaque commemorating the coronation

In Middle Ages Pietraquaria was an important independent fief of the Countship of Albe, as it can be desumed from the Catalogue of the Barons of 1187 and by the same 12th century Papal bull. In 1268 the fortified town suffered the devastation at the hands of Charles I of Anjou's army who, following the victory of the Battle of Tagliacozzo, wanted to take revenge on the hamlets whose inhabitants sided with Conradin of Hohenstaufen's Ghibellines. Thus the inhabitants scattered in Mount Salviano hamlets were forced to go down and gather at Pantano, in the square later dedicated to Saint Bartholomew near contemporary Avezzano, together with the peoples from other villages and Albe, which was also plundered by the Angevins.

Religious tradition reports that the Madonna's image remained for centuries within the ruined church of Mount Salviano, and was recovered following a miraculous encounter on Mount Salviano between a young deaf-mute shepherd and the Virgin, which caused the reconstruction of the church.

According to the work Historiae Marsorum by Muzio Febonio, in 1614 there was the complete reconstruction of the religious building, which was enlarged compared to the original church, as it was recorded in the subsequent affidavit for the Madonna's coronation by notary Pietro Orlandi.

=== Marian apparition ===
Oral tradition has brought a story to the present day, about a deaf-mute shepherd boy from Avezzano to whom, while pasturing the flock on Mount Salviano and gazing at the waters of Fucino, the Madonna appeared dressed in white on a mule. She addressed him in tender words, which the deaf-mute miraculously managed to hear, and asked him to have her church rebuilt by Avezzanese people. The shepherd boy came down running from Mount Salviano, and as soon as he reached Avezzano went to the parish priest, whom he told what the Holy Virgin had recommended, that is, to restore the Church of Saint Mary and worthily replace the sacred image onto the altar.

The Chapel of the Apparition situated along the Via Crucis on Mount Salviano preserves the print that the Madonna's mule carved in the stone with a blow of his hoof before disappearing with the Virgin. The reconstruction of the church occurred in 1614 and the cult of the Virgin of Pietraquaria grew among all the inhabitants of Avezzano.

=== Miracles ===
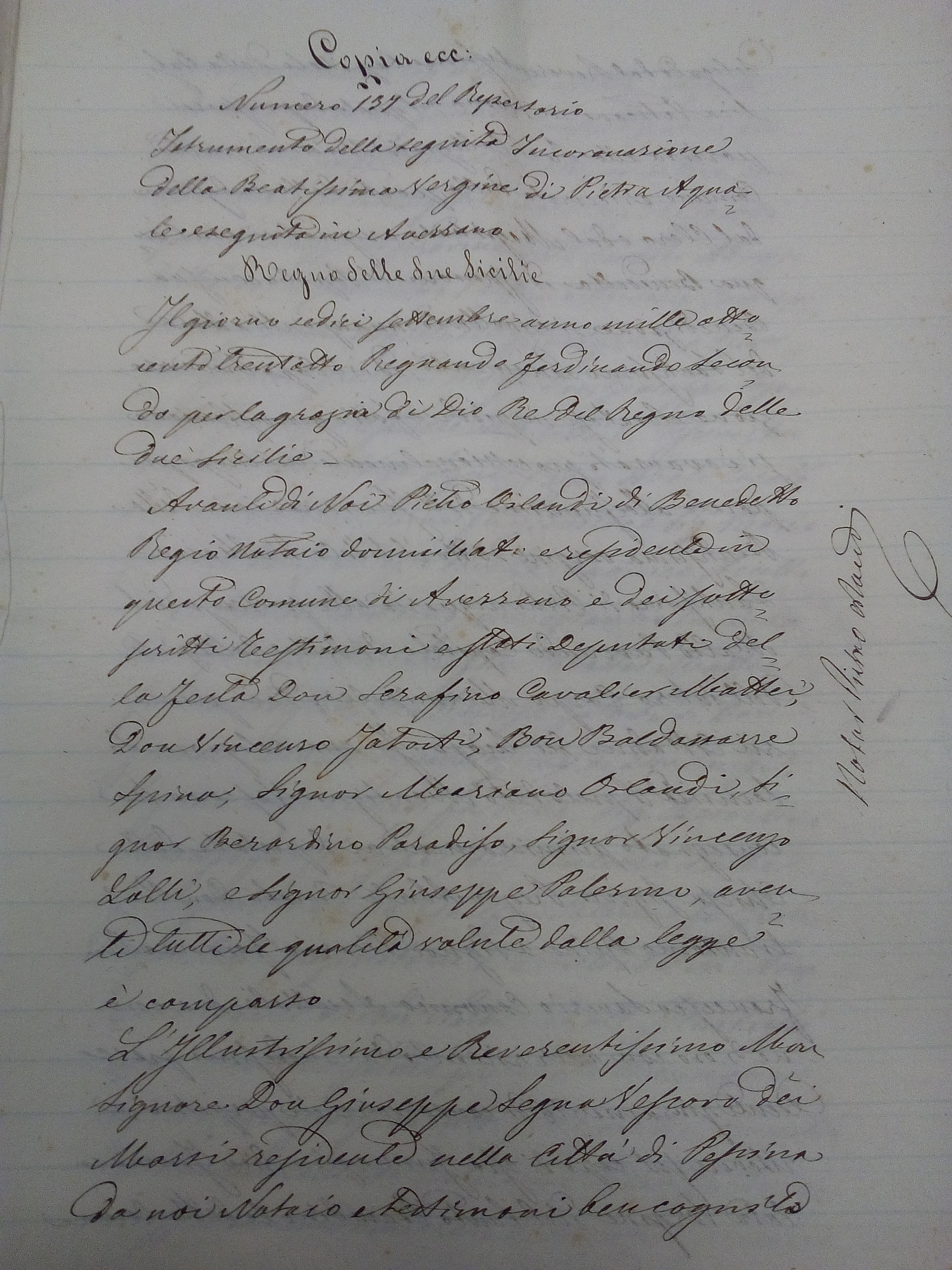
Copy of a page from the affidavit drawn up in 1838

The Madonna di Pietraquaria is traditionally credited with numerous miracles, owing to which the image was solemnly crowned by the Vatican Chapter in 1838:

- The liberation from drought on 27 April 1779 after a penitence procession, therefore the Madonna's annual feast was established on that day (previously the Madonna di Pietraquaria was celebrated on the fourth Sunday of May). In that year the population of Avezzano had serious difficulties because of a long drought which caused several problems and a shortage of food. The inhabitants of the town incessantly prayed the Madonna, whom on 27 April they took in procession from the sanctuary dedicated to her on Mount Salviano to the town centre. When the procession entered Naples Street a miraculous storm occurred that broke dryness, allowing the population to look after crops again with the necessary vigour. In the same year, thanks to the offerings and donations from Avezzano citizens the sacred building was enlarged and the veneration grew with it.
- The liberation from the French invasion in the early 19th century.
- The liberation from the sack of Avezzano by the same French to eliminate the brigands who had occupied it in the early 19th century.
- The cessation of flood waters in 1836.
- The liberation from cholera in 1837.
- On 27 April 1944, Anglo-American Flying Fortresses took off to raze to the ground Avezzano, then an important railway junction. That day, a thick fog covered the city and therefore the Allied forces headed towards another place.

Besides, at the Sanctuary of Pietraquaria, visitors can admire about one hundred ex votos, exposed in the Confraternity's dedicated rooms and donated by those who in the past believed that they had received blessings from the Virgin Mary of Pietraquaria.

=== Icon ===
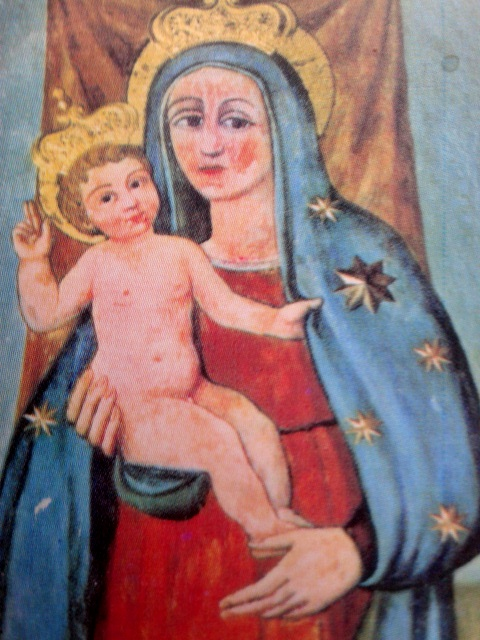
Icon of the Madonna di Pietraquaria (author unknown, 13th–14th century)

The small Church of Saint Mary in the medieval nucleus of Pietra Aquaria contained the painting depicting the image of the Holy Virgin. The historical events of the Battle of Tagliacozzo, which occurred in the Palentine Plains between Charles I of Anjou and Conradin of Hohenstaufen, led to the destruction of the village of Pietra Aquaria and obliged inhabitants to gather at Pantano, in the plain where contemporary Avezzano lies. After the destruction operated by the Angevins the image of the Virgin remained miraculously intact between the ruined walls of the church. The painting on wood, originally in a Byzantine style and the work by an unknown author, was modified in the early Risorgimento period.

The Madonna is depicted standing, dressed in red with a blue coloured, star-studded mantle; she supports the Jesus Child with her right arm while keeping his feet with the palm of her left hand. The Child appears naked while blessing with the three fingers of his right hand and gently keeping a hem of his mother's mantle. Following the coronation occurring in 1838, two golden diadems were placed upon the statue.

=== Coronation of the icon ===
On 16 September 1838 the solemn coronation consented to by the Vatican Chapter in Saint Peter's occurred. In 1891, after further enlargements of the sacred building, the Confraternita di Maria Santissima di Pietraquaria ("Confraternity of Most Holy Mary of Pietraquaria") was established, officially recognized by the Diocese of Marsi. On a pedestal, placed on the Mount Salviano pass, a small bronze statue depicting the Madonna stands; a plaque commemorating the coronation was posted by the Avezzano Pro Loco (local promotion association) in 2013 in accordance with the local Confraternity.

== Confraternity ==
The Confraternity of Most Holy Mary of Pietraquaria was established by the Bishop of Marsi Monsignor Enrico De Dominicis with an episcopal bull on 8 June 1891. The Confraternity of Pietraquaria began its activity on 27 September 1891 devoting wide spaces to evangelization, education, activities of assistance and charity in order to follow the teachings dictated by the Vatican Council II.

== Feast of the Madonna di Pietraquaria ==
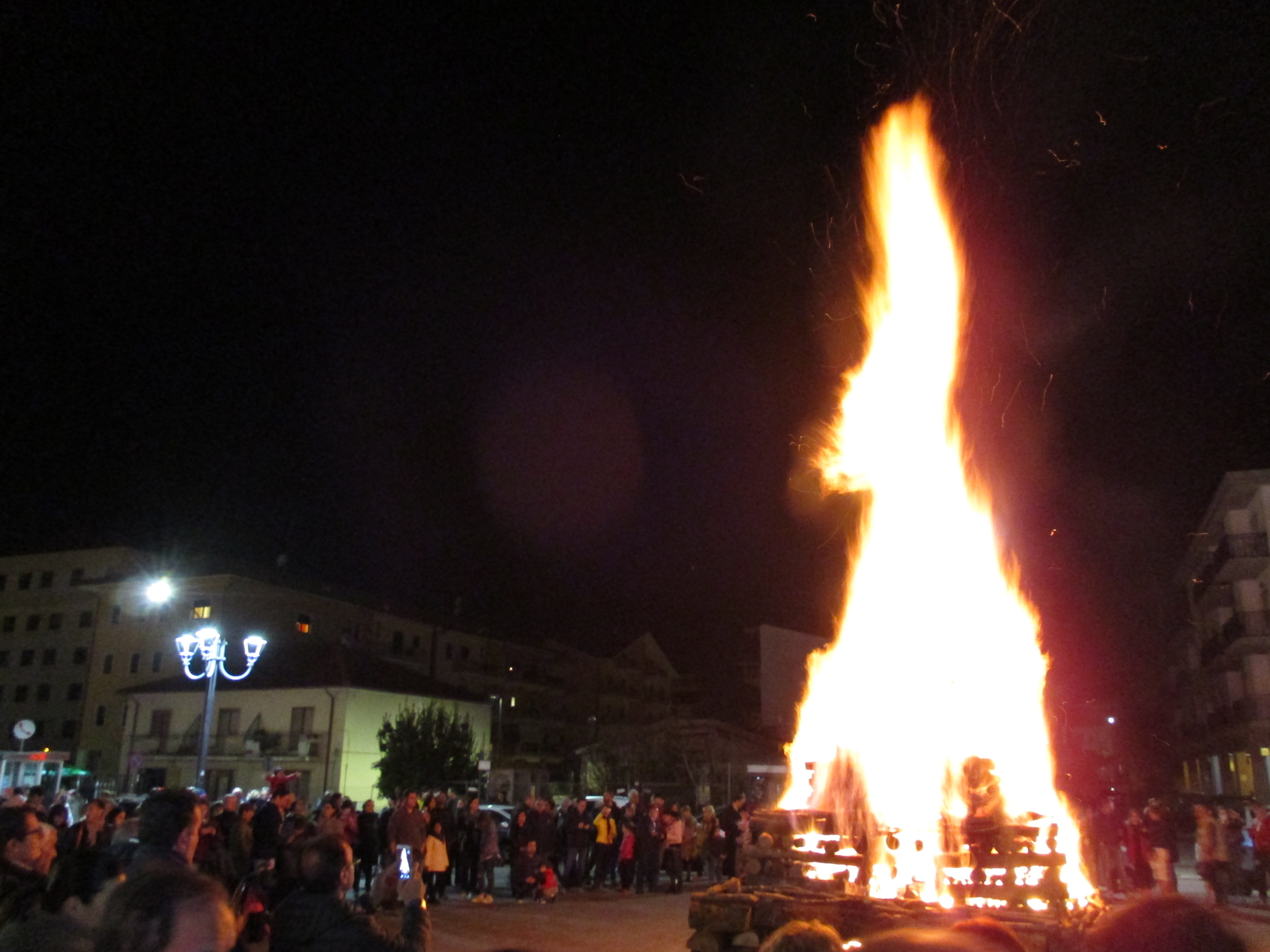
Focaraccio in the Madonna del Passo district of Avezzano

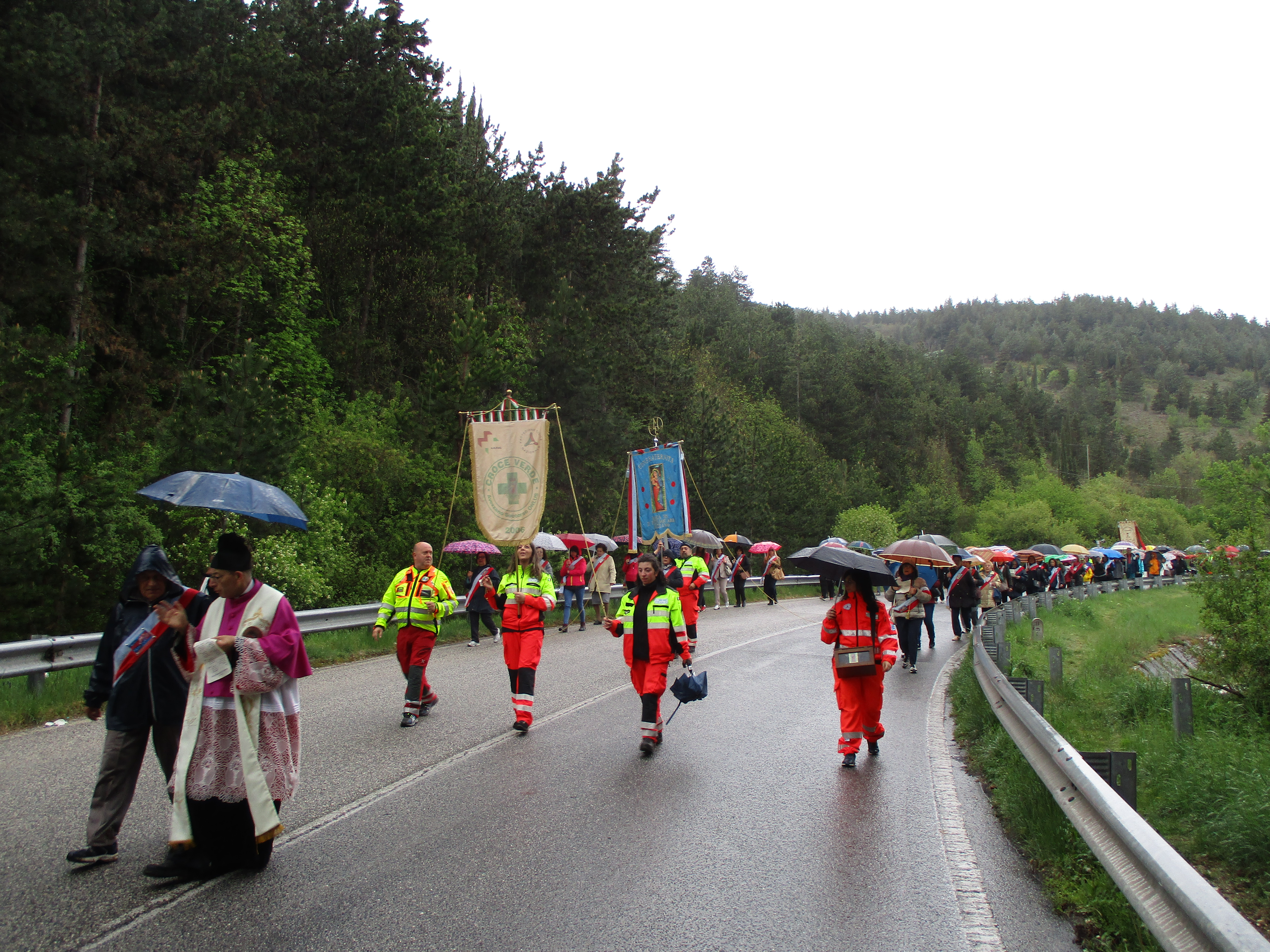
Procession of the Madonna di Pietraquaria

Every year the patronal festival lasts for three days from 25 to 27 April. On 25 April the traditional Pietraquaria Fair takes place, which is organized by the Assessorship of Productive Activities of the Avezzano municipality. There are hundreds of exhibitors and nonprofit organization along the streets of the town center. During the fair CIDEC (Italian Confederation of Dealers and Shopkeepers) organizes the local antiques street market in the central Risorgimento Square.

Since 1870, on 26 April at dusk the so-called focaracci are kindled in all the town districts. They are devotional bonfires in honour of the Madonna di Pietraquaria, similar to the Beltane bonfires. Around them popular and religious songs and small music concerts are performed. According to a legend the tradition of focaracci arose from a dispute between the populations of Avezzano and Cese about whom merited the Virgin's protection. From the top of Mount Salviano the Madonna turned towards the city of Avezzano to look at the bonfires that were lit by Avezzanese people in order to draw her attention.

Prior to the 1915 earthquake, on the day of the celebrations in honour of the Madonna the Contest of the Solco Dritto ("Straight Furrow") took place, where local farmers challenged each other with the plough and oxen to trace a furrow from Torlonia Square to the slopes of Mount Salviano. A commission was called to determine the best furrow.

During the 1992 civil celebrations the Corsa dei Fuochi ("Race of Fires") was organized: it was a foot race competition, which saw the participation of several teams representing the Avezzano districts, competing for the city banner, and of several Marsica teams, competing for the Fucino banner.

Religious rites are held on 27 April, officially recognized as the patronal holy day of Avezzano. Every year the statue of the Virgin is taken in procession going down the Via Crucis of Mount Salviano, and then reaching the Cathedral of St. Bartholomew along two urban routes which alternate from year to year, according to the confraternity organizing the rite.

In the Marian month of May the custom remains of going to the Sanctuary of the Madonna di Pietraquaria on foot at dawn, through the Mount Saviano trails.

In 2017 the Madonna di Pietraquaria has been proclaimed the patroness of Marsica runners and racewalkers.

== See also ==
- Sanctuary of the Madonna di Pietraquaria
- Avezzano

== Bibliography ==
- Brogi, Tommaso (1954). Il santuario ed il castello di Pietraquaria nella Marsica (in Italian). Rome: Istituto Grafico Tiberino. SBN IT\ICCU\AQ1\0055216.
- Febonio, Muzio (1678). Historiae Marsorum (libri tres) (in Latin). Naples: Michaelem Monachum. SBN IT\ICCU\SBLE\003381.
- Pagani, Giovanni (1966). Avezzano e la sua storia (in Italian). Casamari: Tipografia dell'Abbazia. SBN IT\ICCU\SBL\0393481.
- Palmieri, Eliseo (2006). Avezzano, un secolo di immagini (in Italian). Pescara: Paolo de Siena editore. SBN IT\ICCU\TER\0011256.
- Tarquinio, Gianluca (2015). Canti folkloristici della Marsica: la musica popolare testimone della ripresa culturale post-terremoto (in Italian). Avezzano: LCL Stampe Litografiche. SBN IT\ICCU\AQ1\0119105.
