= Riserva Naturale di Monte Salviano =

Italian nature reserve

- Riserva naturale guidata Monte Salviano
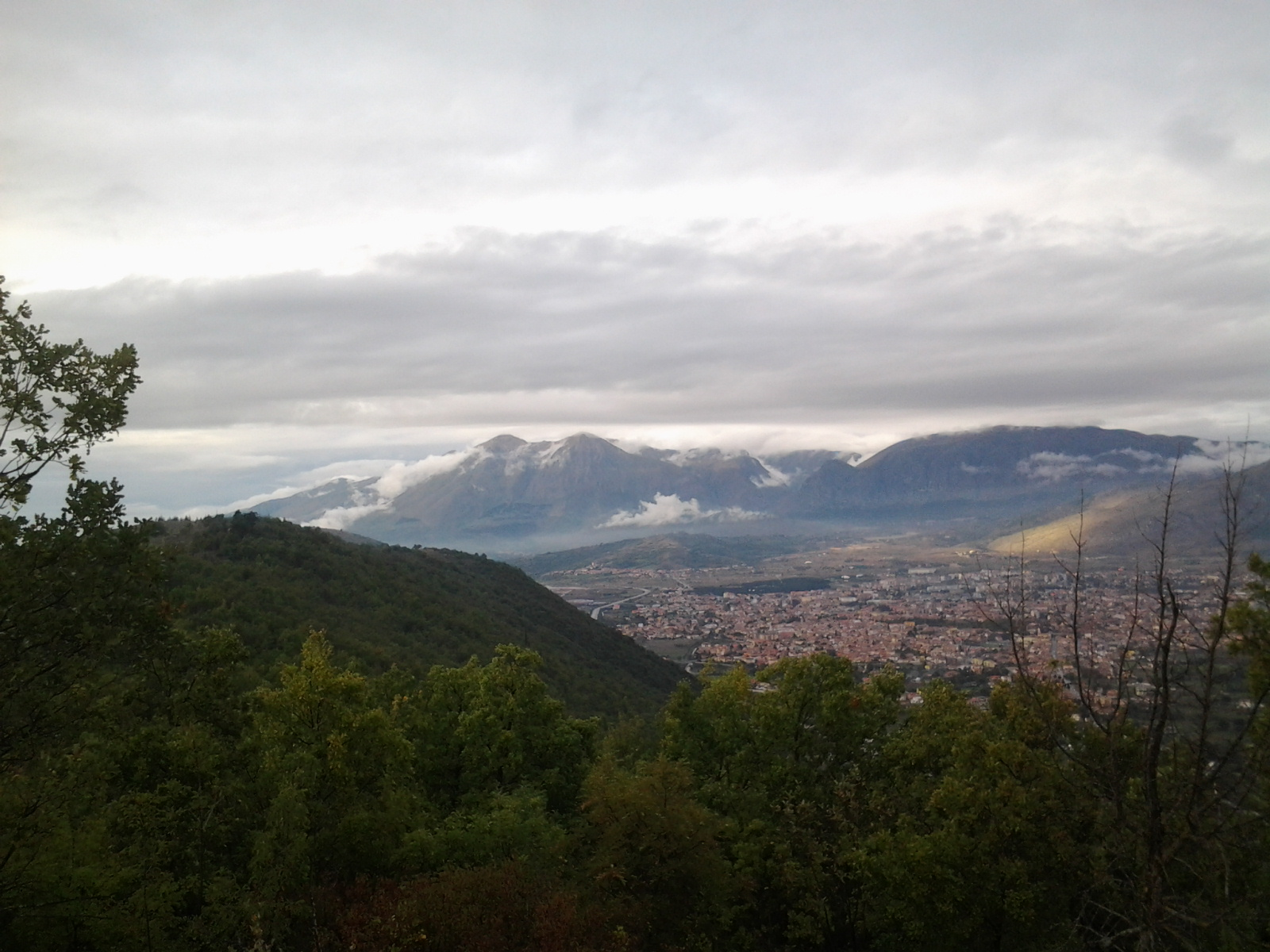
- View from Monte Salviano

- Location within Italy
- Location: Province of L'Aquila, Abruzzo, Italy
- Nearest city: Avezzano
- Coordinates: 42°00′50.7″N 13°24′14.2″E
- Area: 722 ha (1,780 acres)
- Governing body: Municipality of Avezzano

The Riserva Naturale di Monte Salviano or Riserva naturale guidata Monte Salviano is a nature reserve in Abruzzo, Italy, established in 1999. It lies in the territory of the comune (municipality) of Avezzano, in the Province of L'Aquila. The reserve is named after Monte Salviano, a massif that extends northwest to southwest dividing the Fucine basin from the Palentine Plains, in the Marsica sub-region.

== History and description ==
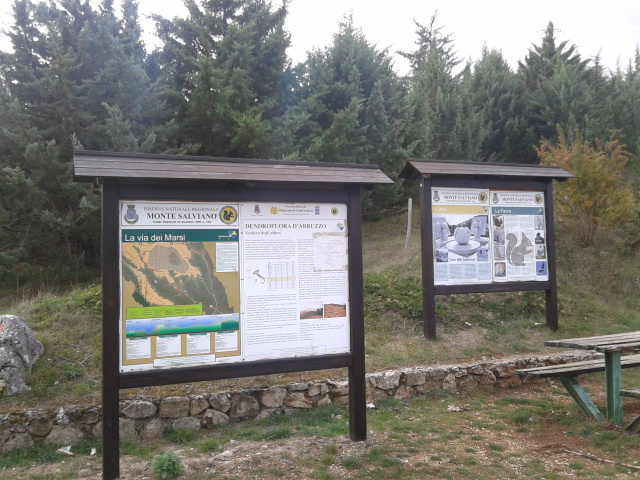
Information signs at the entrance in the Via dei Marsi (Marsi Road)

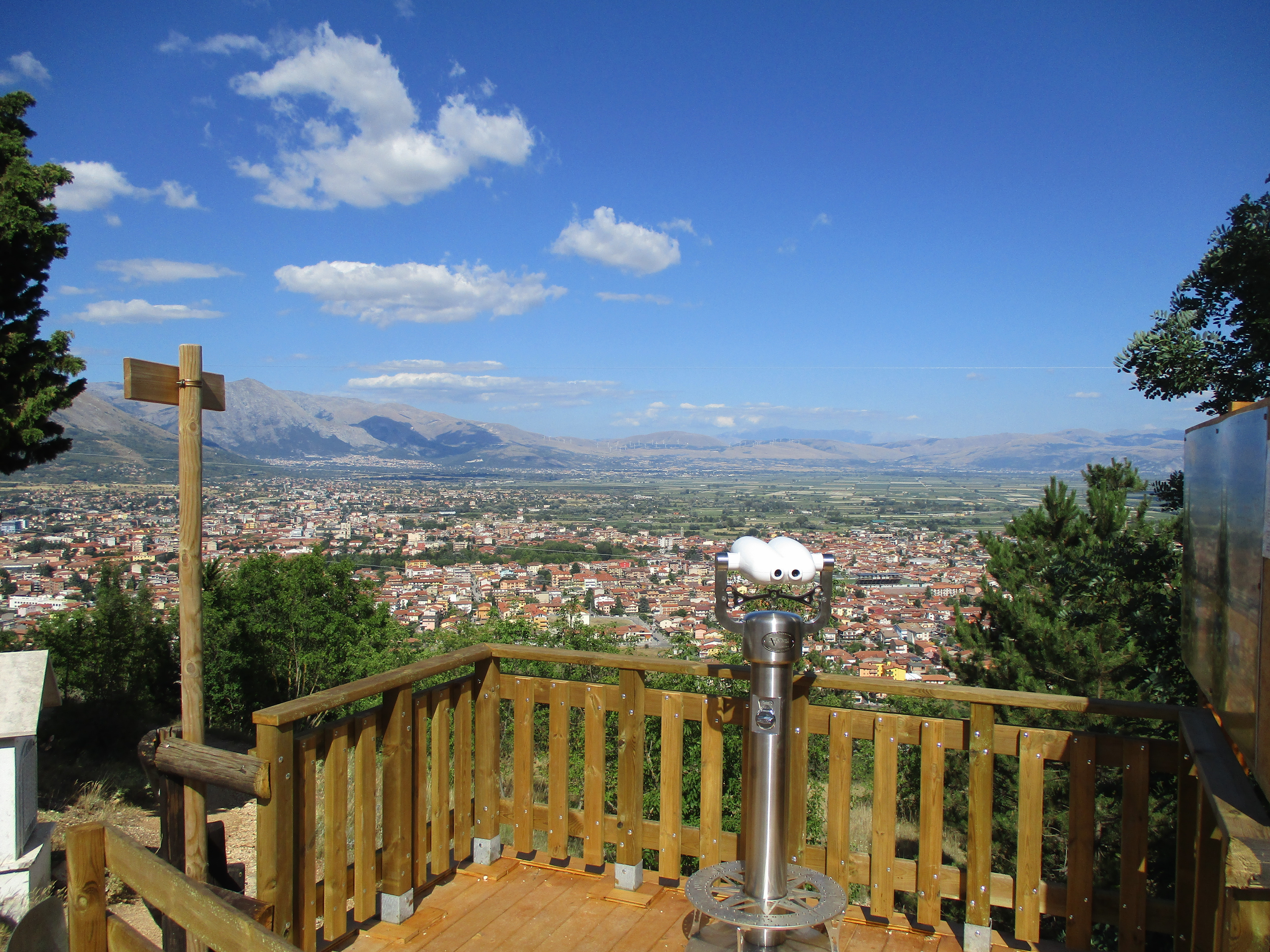
Panoramic binoculars along the Via Crucis

…luogo di fede e di cultura in armonia con la natura…

— The motto of the nature reserve
Translation:

…a place of faith and culture in harmony with nature…

The reserve, formerly a peri-urban park, comprises an area of about 722 hectares (1,780 acres), entirely situated in the territory of the municipality of Avezzano, Abruzzo. It was strongly wanted and created thanks to the commitment of the association "Il Salviano", of the project inventor and co-ordinator Sergio Rozzi and of a group of ecologists devoted to this project starting from the 1960s. It became a concrete reality in 1993 with the creation of the Salviano Peri-Urban Park, which since 1999 has been officially recognized by the Region of Abruzzo as the Riserva naturale guidata del monte Salviano.

A site of community importance, the reserve has been managed since 2007 by the association Ambiente e/è Vita Abruzzo ("Environment and/is Life Abruzzo"), together with the municipality of Avezzano.

In 2010, the municipality enlarged the protected area by identifying an outer, lessened protection strip of about 800 hectares (2,000 acres) comprised between the Fucine basin and the Palentine Plains, established with the purpose of protecting the environmental, historical and cultural aspects of the whole area, including the Tunnels of Claudius, the Cave of Ciccio Felice, the river park of the Inlet, some zones and structures of the former Avezzano sugar mill and the Rafia Torrent (or La Raffia) near Cese dei Marsi.

The pinewood represents the most characterized area of Monte Salviano, especially along the route leading to the Sanctuary of the Madonna di Pietraquaria. In 1916, the first pines were planted by the prisoners of war of the Austro-Hungarian concentration camp established north of Avezzano after the 1915 earthquake and during the Great War. In the summer of 1993, part of the territory was hit by a violent fire which almost completely destroyed its vegetation, mostly made up by black pines. Among the animals living in the protected area, the squirrel (the nature reserve symbol), the badger, the fox, the polecat, the weasel, the hare, the griffon and several chaffinches can also be found.

The sanctuary devoted to the Madonna di Pietraquaria and situated at 1,000 metres (3,300 ft) MSL is known for the miraculous image which is venerated there.

On the slopes of Monte Salviano, in a protected area, the memorial of the 1915 earthquake rises, also devoted to the youths that, having survived the earthquake, died on the front of World War I. The obelisk of the memorial was built by artist Pasquale Di Fabio in 1965. A shelter for the recovery of the protected species of ill or wounded wild animals, coming from Abruzzo mountains, is housed in a two-hectare (five-acre) land located behind the sanctuary on the slopes of Monte Cimarani. The centre of protected species shows two watering places, two mangers and a shelter.

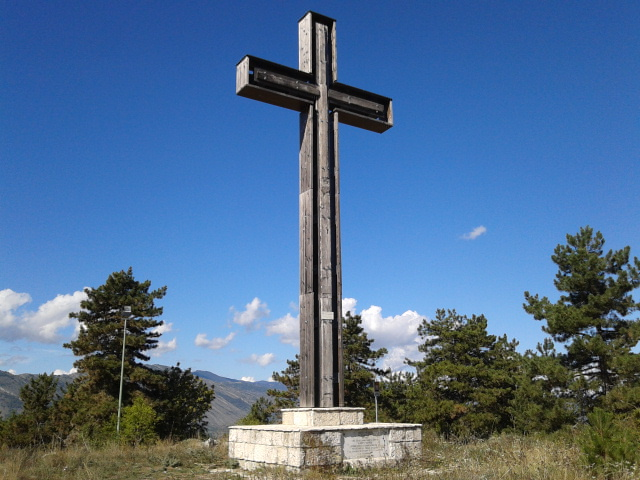
The Crocione

On the eastern side sloping down to the Fucine plain south Avezzano, the entrances to the Tunnels of Claudius are visible, whose first construction traces back to the 1st century AD. The work features the underground emissary that pierces the mountain belly as far as the intersection with the Liri River, under the old town of Capistrello and through the service tunnels which allowed to drain and reclaim the Fucine area through the water drainage beyond the mountain. In 1877, firstly thanks to the enlargement of the Roman emissary, banker Alessandro Torlonia made it possible the definitive and full draining of the Fucine plateau. Since 1977, the tunnel area has been equipped with an archaeological park with the purpose of protecting and exploiting them.

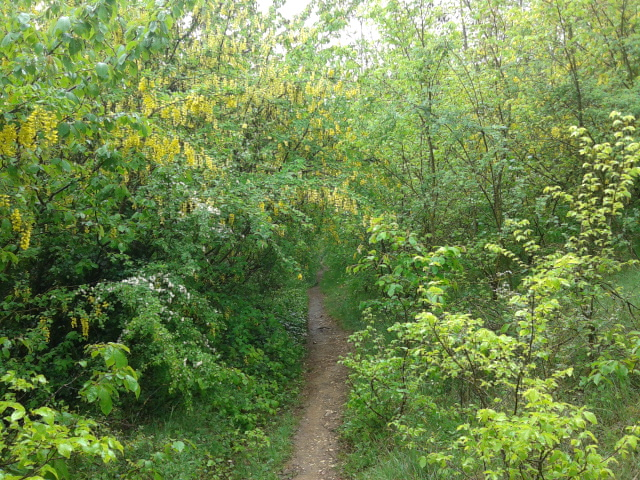
Trail of Monte Salviano

A trail in the heart of the reserve was dedicated by the Avezzano Scout Group to Lord Baden Powell. Not far from there rises the Crocione (in Italian literally "Big Cross"), a giant wooden cross placed among the trees in 1902. In May 2006, with its blessing, a long and complex restoration phase ended.

The Salviano mountain area on the western side sloping down to Capistrello was at the centre of the event of the Massacre of the 33 Martyrs, who during World War II were caught on the mountain slopes and subsequently shot by German troops.

=== Theatre of Germination ===
In 2000, the work entitled Theatre of Germination (Italian: Teatro della Germinazione), a sculpture by artist Pietro Cascella, was installed on the pass. The work, built in 1998 with Carrara and partly Majella stone, was initially conceived to be exhibited in the National Park of Abruzzo, Lazio and Molise. After being placed for a couple of years in some Pescasseroli storehouses waiting to be assembled, it was placed on the Monte Salviano pass thanks to the Avezzano mayor, Mario Spallone, and the park manager, Franco Tassi. After visiting the pass, Tassi and Cascella gave their assent for the definitive exhibition of the work.

The sculpture is made up of a central, spherical-shaped high relief depicting an egg surrounded by water, and four panels positioned in a circle with the celestial sphere and other associated elements in the centre. Germination represents the creation of nature and man in a metaphorical sense.

=== The Pilgrim's House ===
Not far from the Sanctuary of the Madonna di Pietraquaria, near the former stone bar, the cultural centre named "Pilgrim's House" (Italian: Casa del Pellegrino) was set up, where the photographs of local fauna and mountain herbs, plants and fruits are exhibited. Here meetings and conferences on environmental problems, needs and proposals take place.

=== The Marsi Road ===
Near the pass a panoramic route departs that climbs up the "Marsi Road" (Italian: Via dei Marsi), an ancient trail already existing in the Pre-Roman Age which is part of the E1 European long distance path and connects Monte Salviano, through the Cunicella route (939 metres (3,081 ft) MSL) and the Lucus Angitiae wood, to the Abruzzo National Park. The project related to the trail, named "The Marsi Road: the Marsican Green Thorn (An Environmental, Historical, Cultural, Religious, and Tourist Route)" (Italian: La via dei Marsi: la spina verde marsicana (Itinerario ambientale, storico, culturale, religioso e turistico)), obtained the important, special mention ERCI team Onlus on the occasion of the "Landscape Prize 2012-2013" established by the Council of Europe.

=== The caves ===
At a short distance from the entrances to the Tunnels of Claudius the Cave of Ciccio Felice opens, which was explored for the first time in 1948 by Piero Barocelli together with Antonio Mario Radmilli. Diggings and research allowed to reconstruct the habits of the populations from the Upper Paleolithic and the subsequent historical periods who inhabited them. Nearby are the Afra and La Difesa Caves.

Instead, between the territories of Cese dei Marsi and Cappelle dei Marsi, on the eastern side of the Monte Salviano range (Monte d'Aria, Monte Cimarani and Monte San Felice), are the Palentine Caves. They are small caves used by shepherds and, during World War II, as a hideout by the Italian partisans and Allied prisoners escaped from Abruzzese concentration camps.

== Biology and ecology ==
=== Flora ===
In spring the sunny valleys and ridges are covered with the yellow flowers of the Jerusalem sage (known as salvione in Italian) which, being present in abundance, characterizes the whole mountainous territory. Sage, mountain cornflower, juniper, lady orchid, dog rose, common laburnum, Marsican lady's mantle and Iris marsica can also be observed.

The rich biodiversity of dendroflora features black pines, chestnuts, downy oaks and other spontaneous autochthonous species typical of the reserve woods. In the summer of 1993 a fire seriously damaged the floro-faunistic heritage. The slow ecological restoration, carried out through the reforestation of autochthonous and indigenous species and favouring the process of spontaneous renaturalization, consolidated the Monte Salviano ecosystem.

=== Fauna ===
- Avifauna: the common buzzard, the griffon vulture, the kestrel, the peregrine falcon and many other birds are frequent visitors to the reserve wood.
- Mammals: the red squirrel chosen as the reserve symbol is certainly the most numerous among the mammals present. Additionally there are the crested porcupine, the red deer, the roe deer, and the wild boar, the weasel and other mustelids as well as the hare and the fox. In 2017 a Marsican brown bear cub was sighted.
- Invertebrates: various Lepidoptera species among which Triaxomera marsica and most exceptionally the Muschampia proto, a butterfly known as sage skipper of the family Hesperiidae, have also been sighted on Monte Salviano.

== Gallery ==
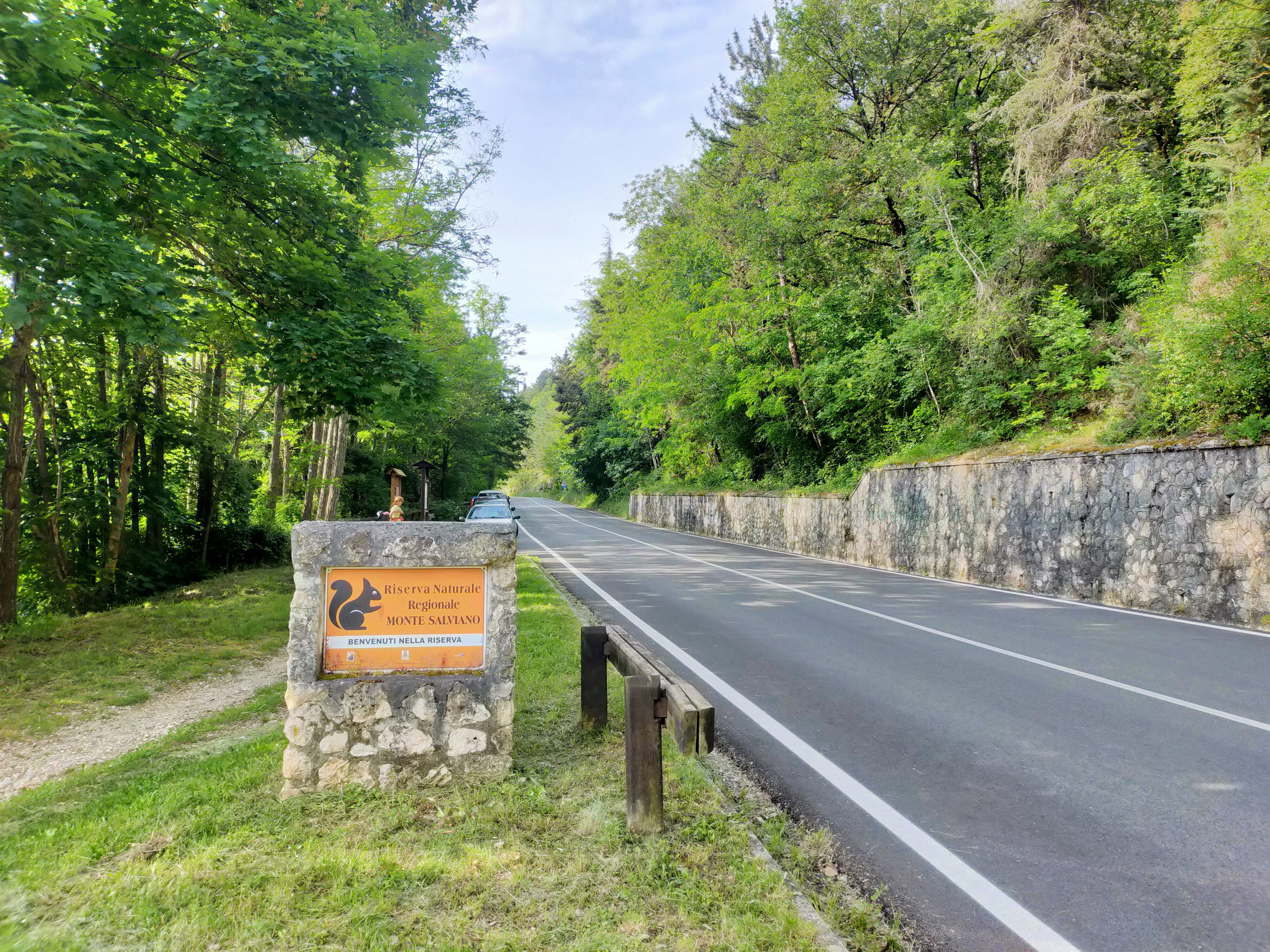
Entrance to the nature reserve

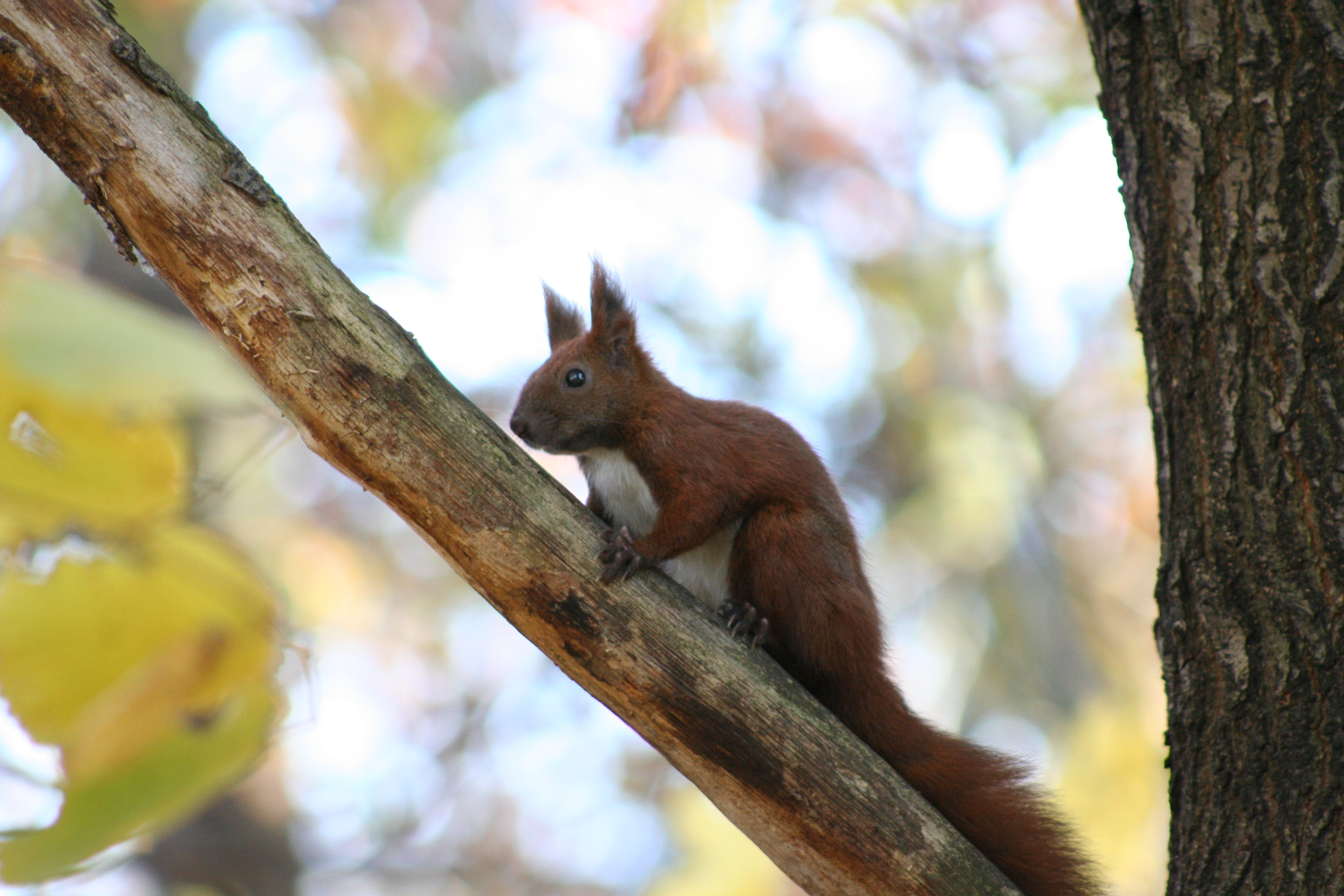
Red squirrel

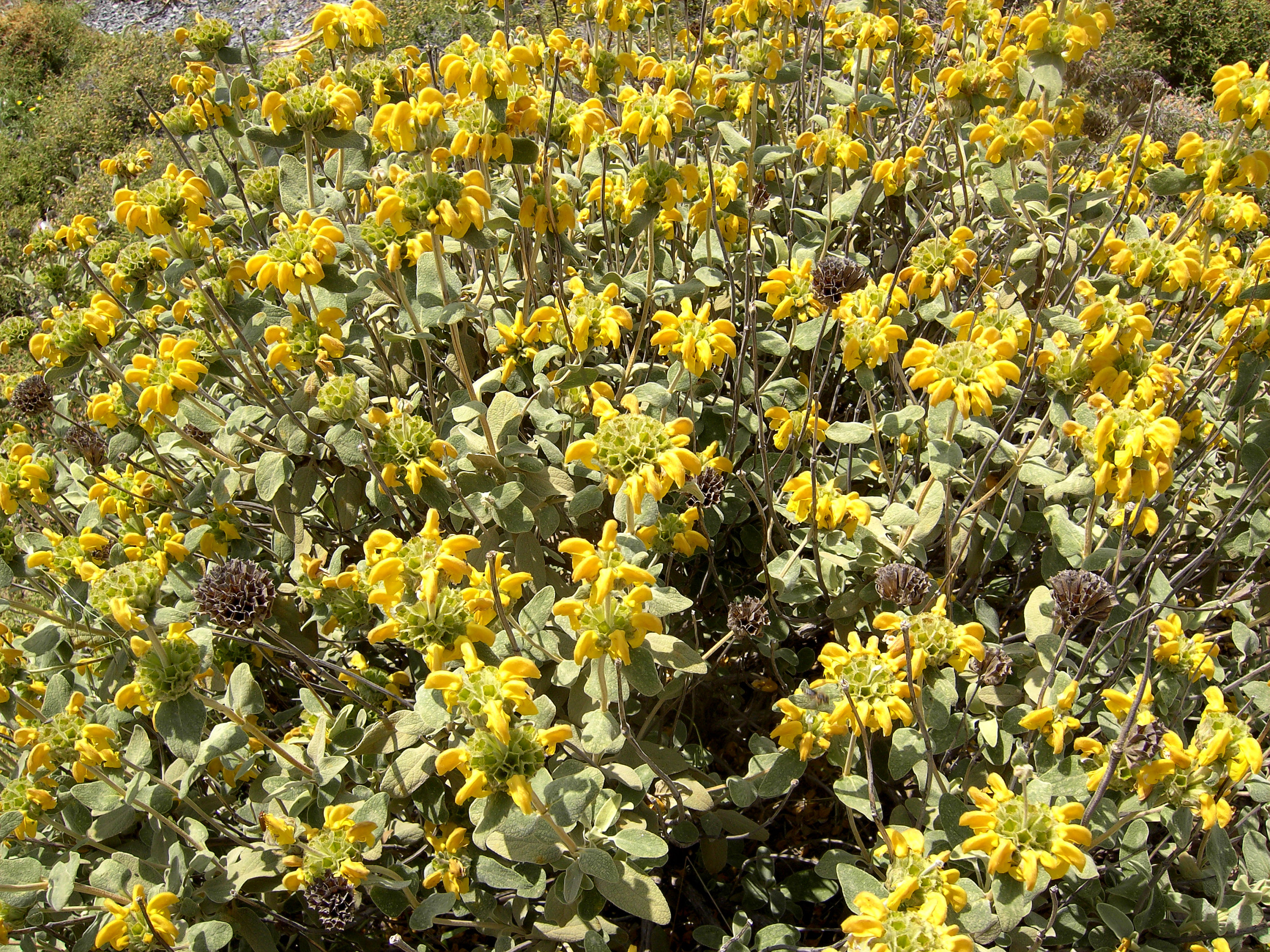
Jerusalem sage

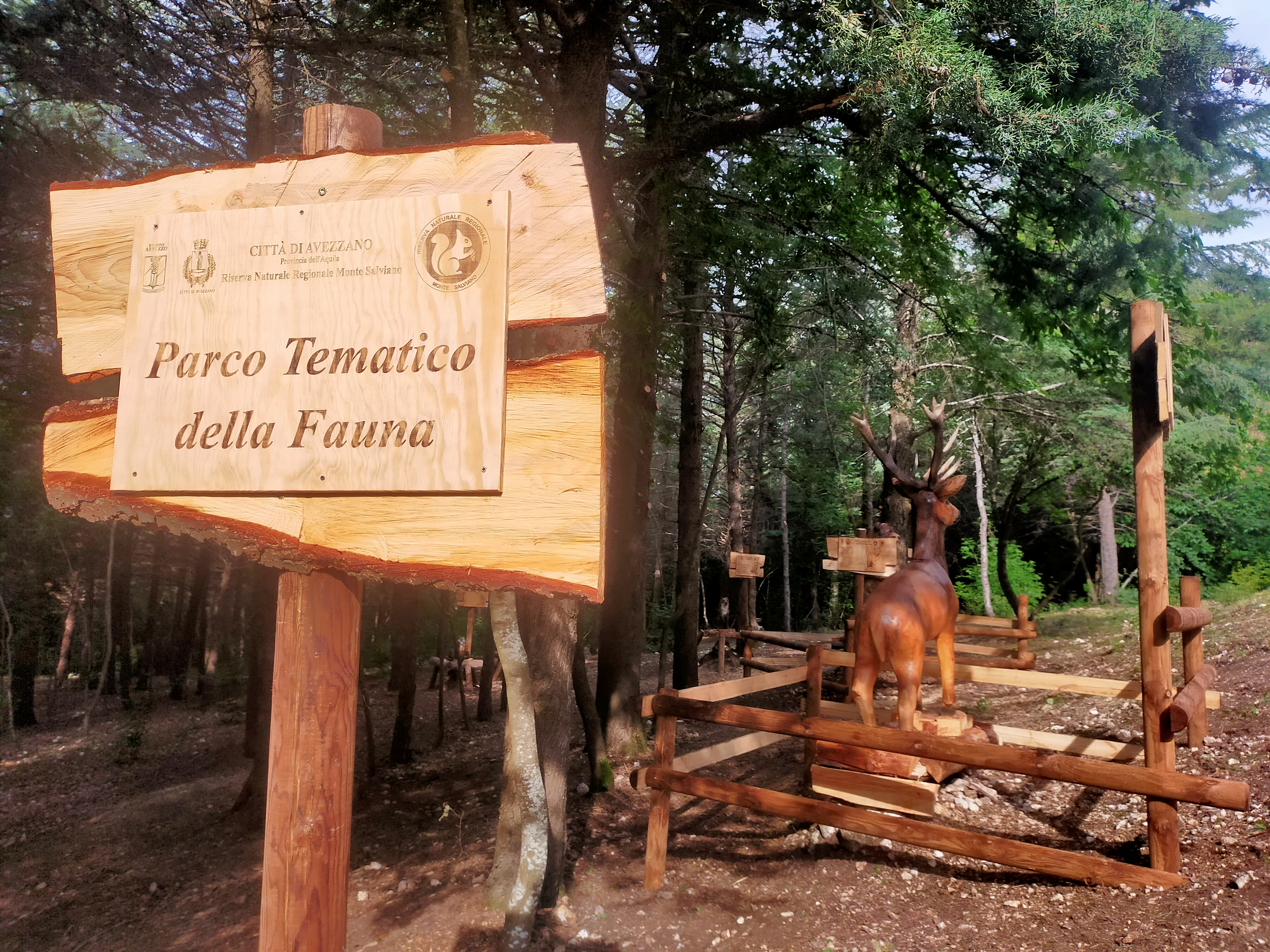
Wildlife park

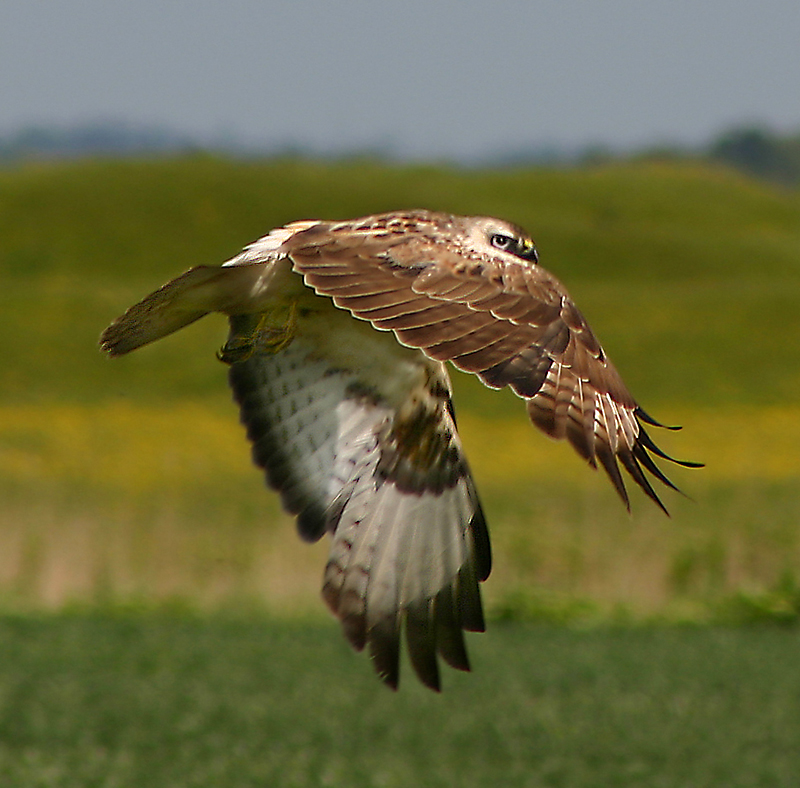
Common buzzard

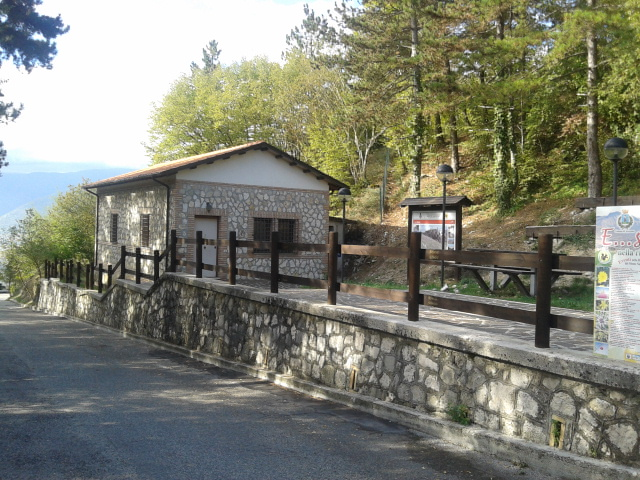
The Pilgrim's House

== See also ==
- Monte Salviano
- Sanctuary of the Madonna di Pietraquaria
- Parco Nazionale d'Abruzzo, Lazio e Molise
- Sirente-Velino Regional Park
