= Festival Cinema e Ambiente Avezzano =

Annual film festival in Avezzano, Italy

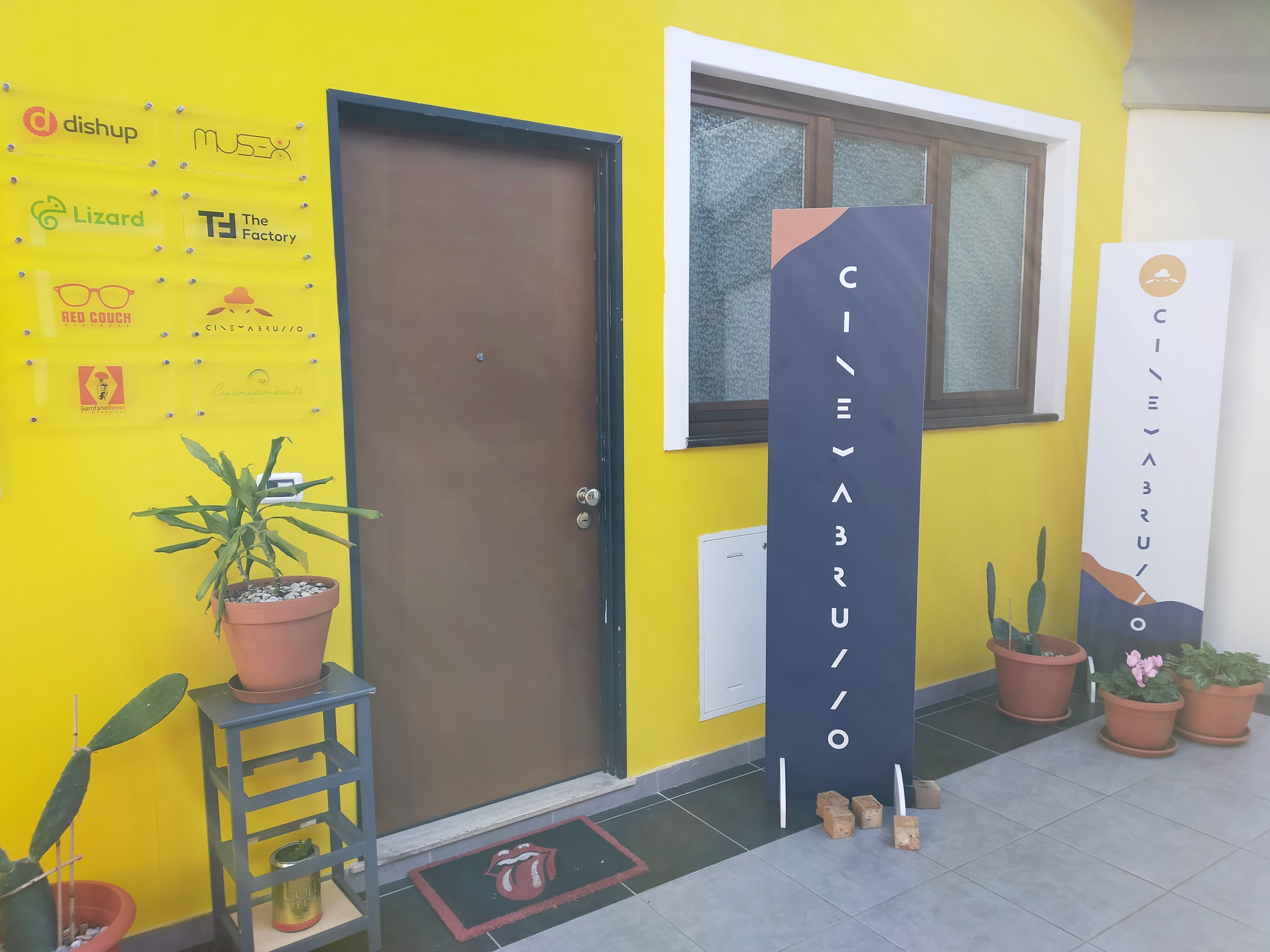
- Location: Avezzano, Italy
- Website: https://cinemaeambienteavezzano.it/

The Festival Cinema e Ambiente Avezzano was an annual film festival held in Avezzano, in the Abruzzo region, Italy. The festival boasted the recognition of the Ministry of Culture.

== The festival ==
The festival Cinema e Ambiente followed the story of Avezzano film festivals and since 2016 it was an international kermesse dedicated to environmentalist feature films, shorts and documentaries. The aim of the festival was to raise awareness and understanding of environmental issues and related film productions from all continents. Lasted five days, it generally takes place in the first week of June in different locations such as the Mazzini arena in the center of Avezzano, the Orsini-Colonna Castle, the Monte Salviano guided nature reserve and the Roman amphitheater of Alba Fucens.

The festival had four sections:

- international competition for fictional or documentary feature films;
- international competition for fictional or documentary short films;
- international competition for projects reserved for underage students;
- international competition for short screenplays.
