= Sanctuary of the Madonna di Pietraquaria =

Italian church in Avezzano

Sanctuary of the Madonna of Pietraquaria
- Santuario della Madonna di Pietraquaria
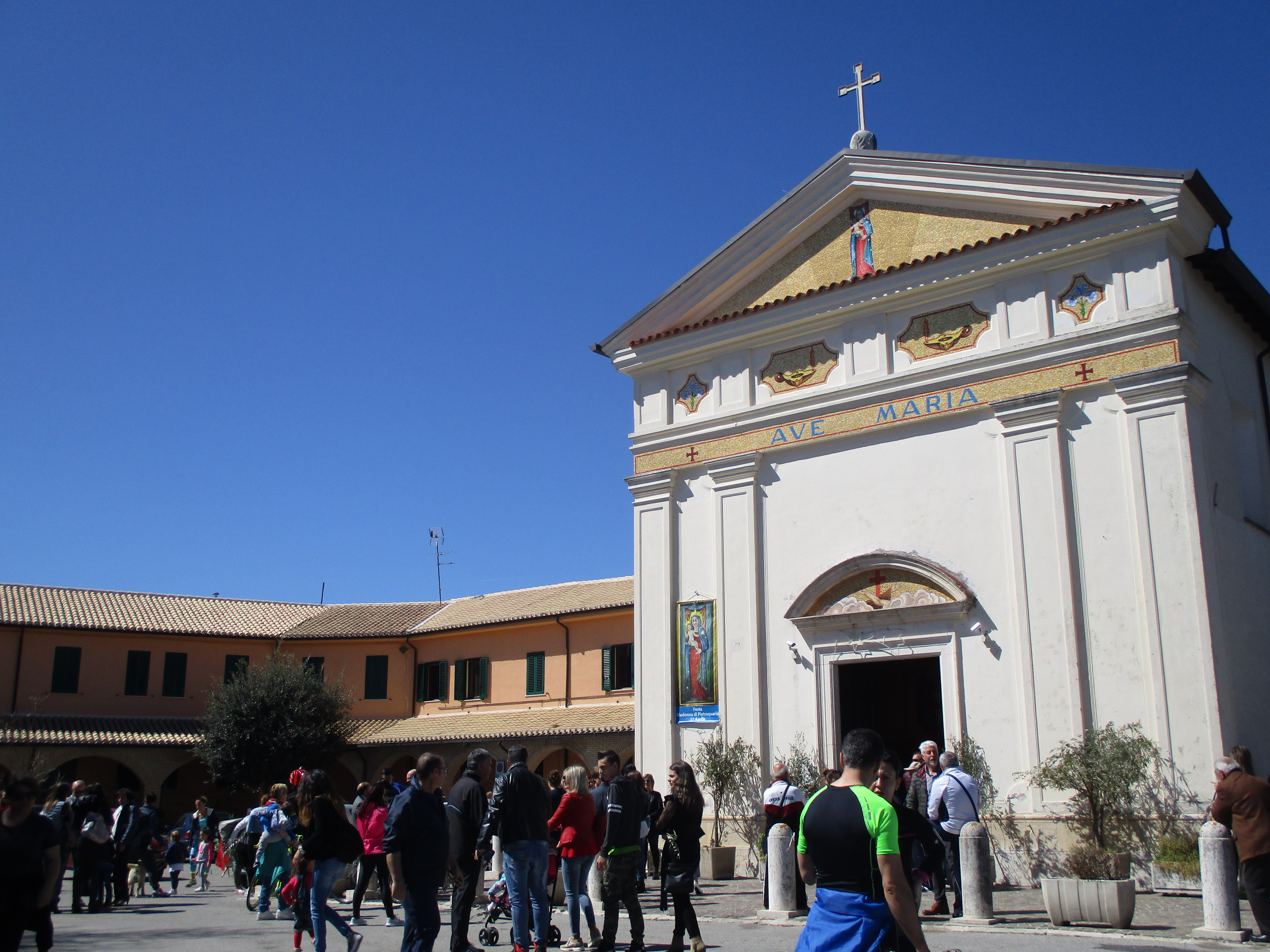
- Façade of the Sanctuary of the Madonna di Pietraquaria

Religion
- Affiliation: Roman Catholic
- Province: L'Aquila
- Region: Abruzzo
- Patron: Madonna di Pietraquaria

Location
- Location: Avezzano, Italy
- State: Italy
- Interactive map of Sanctuary of the Madonna of Pietraquaria
- Territory: Avezzano
- Coordinates: 42.02306°N 13.400386°E

Architecture
- Groundbreaking: 1614 (last rebuilding)
- Completed: 17th century

Website
- madonnadipietraquaria.org

The Sanctuary of the Madonna di Pietraquaria (Italian: Santuario della Madonna di Pietraquaria) is a church situated on Mount Salviano at about 1,000 metres (3,300 feet) ASL in the municipal territory of Avezzano, Abruzzo, Central Italy.

== History ==
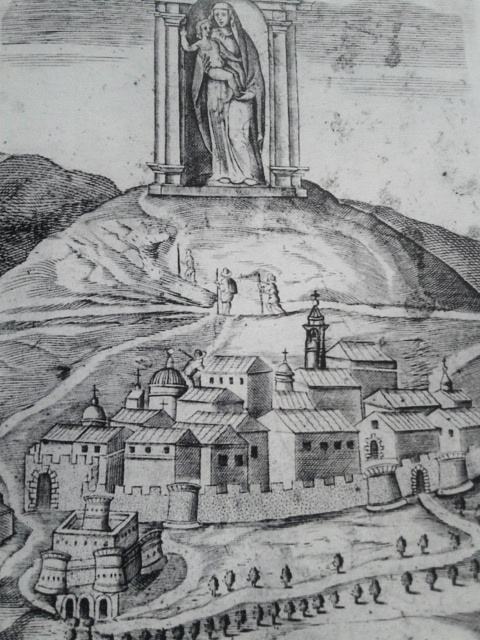
Madonna di Pietraquaria protecting the city of Avezzano (serigraphy by Fedele De Bernardinis, 1791)

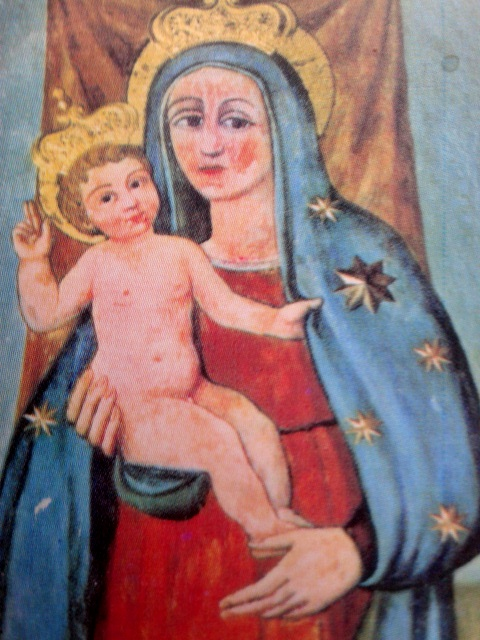
Icon of the Madonna di Pietraquaria (author unknown, 13th–14th century)

Before 1268, in Middle Ages Pietra Aquaria was a populated area, belonging to the Countship of Albe. Here stood three churches dedicated to Saint Mary, Saint John and Saint Peter, respectively. In the church dedicated to the Holy Virgin there was a painting of the Madonna, of unknown age and in a Byzantine style, venerated by local and neighbourhood inhabitants. The historical events of the Battle of Tagliacozzo, which occurred in the Palentine Plains between Charles I of Anjou and Conradin of Hohenstaufen, led to the destruction of the village of Pietra Aquaria and obliged inhabitants to join those of Avezzano in Pantano Square (later called San Bartolomeo Square).

The image of the Holy Virgin remained between the ruined walls of the church. Historian Tommaso Brogi confirmed that the name originated from the works for the enlargement of the square opposite the sanctuary: during the digging and demolition of the rock in that area, some well-defined and spaced cistern spaces appeared; besides, some stony canals were found, which supposedly served to discharge water from the reservoirs. In fact, in ancient Italian pietra aquaria literally means "water stone".

The church, rebuilt and enlarged several times during the centuries, was heavily damaged by the 1915 Avezzano earthquake and reopened for worship in 1969. On 1 January 1978, Maria Santissima di Pietraquaria was proclaimed the patron saint of the city of Avezzano.

== Marian apparition ==
Oral tradition has brought a story to the present day, about a deaf-mute shepherd boy from Avezzano to whom, while pasturing the flock on Mount Salviano and gazing at the waters of Fucino, the Madonna appeared dressed in white on a mule. She addressed him in tender words, which the deaf-mute miraculously managed to hear, and asked him to have her church rebuilt by Avezzanese people. The shepherd boy came down running from Mount Salviano, and as soon as he reached Avezzano went to the parish priest, whom he told what the Holy Virgin had recommended, that is, to restore the Church of Saint Mary and worthily replace the sacred image onto the altar.

The Chapel of the Apparition situated along the via Crucis on Mount Salviano preserves the print that the Madonna's mule carved in the stone with a blow of his hoof before disappearing with the Virgin. The reconstruction of the church occurred in 1614 from the foundations and enlarging the religious building, so much so that the cult of the Virgin of Pietraquaria became even more widespread.

== Miracles ==
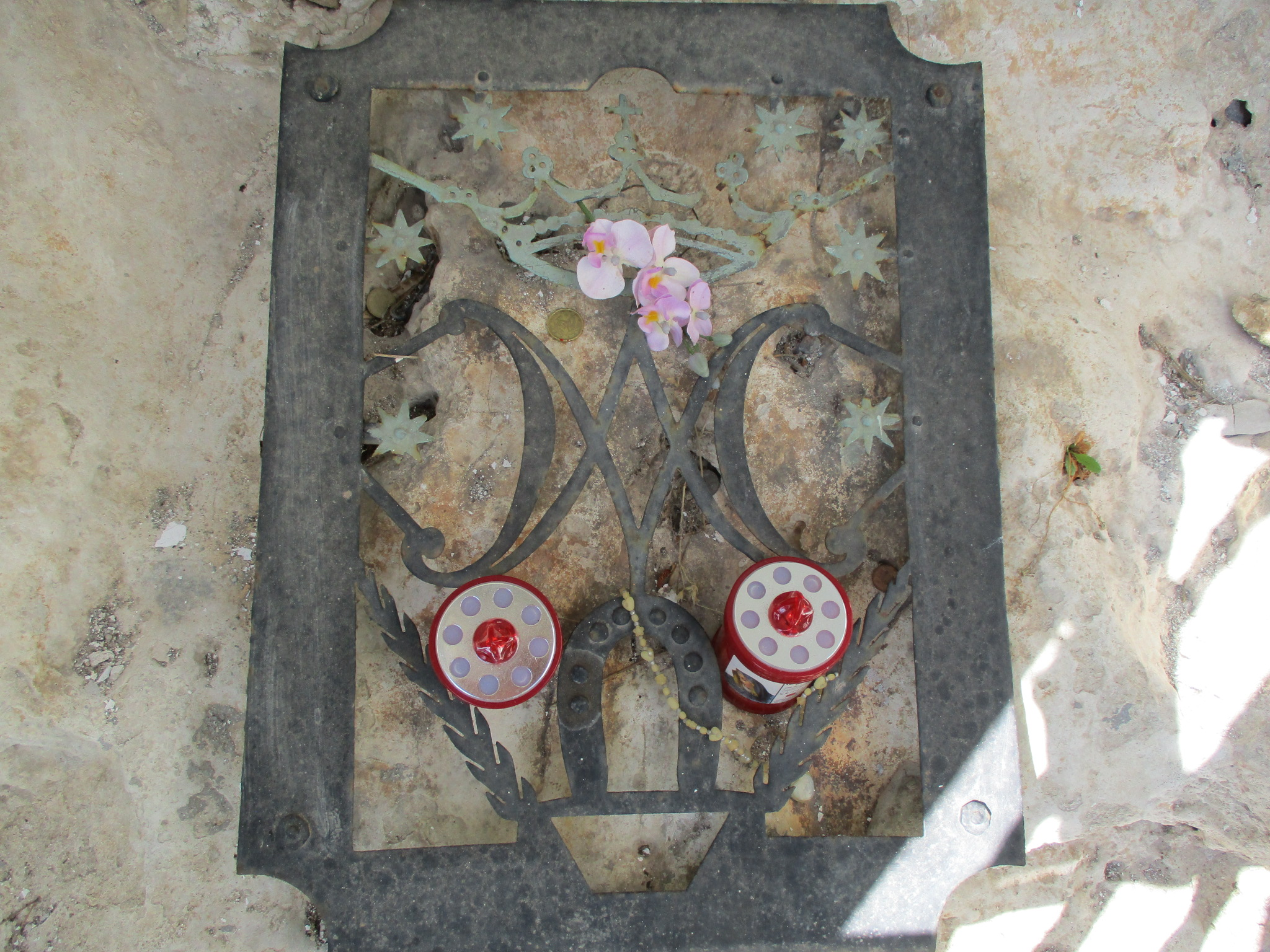
The rock imprinted with the mule's hoof print

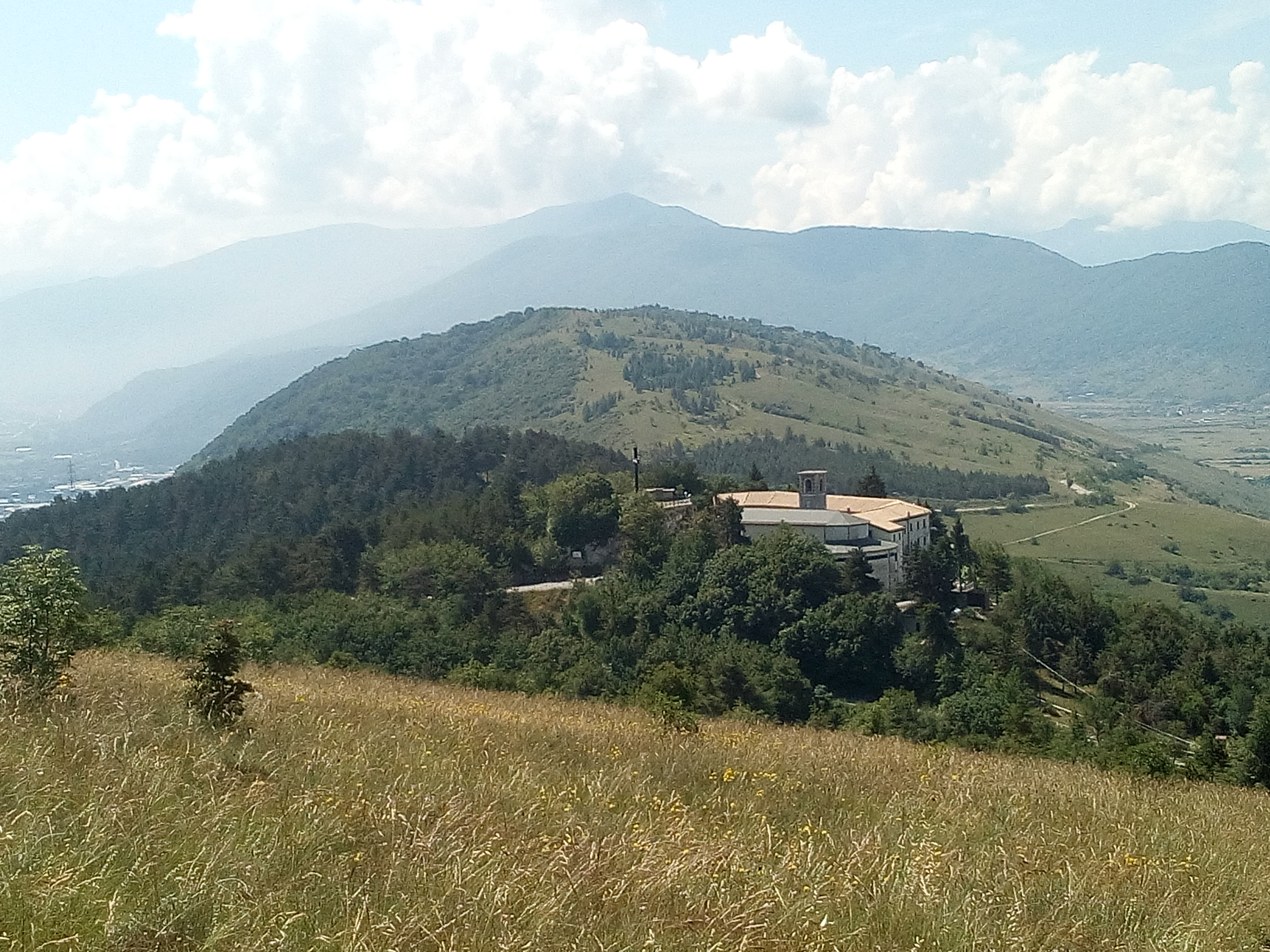
The Pietraquaria complex as seen from Mount Cimarani

The Madonna di Pietraquaria is traditionally credited with numerous miracles, owing to which the image was solemnly crowned by the Vatican Chapter in 1838:

- The liberation from a long period of drought on 27 April 1779: the sacred image was brought in a solemn procession for the first time and a heavy rain suddenly fell on Avezzano, thus putting an end to the dry spell. As a consequence, the Madonna's annual feast was established on that day (previously the Madonna di Pietraquaria was celebrated on the fourth Sunday of May).
- The liberation from the French invasion in 1799.
- The liberation from the sack of Avezzano by the same French to eliminate the brigands who had occupied it in 1800.
- The cessation of flood waters in 1836.
- The liberation from cholera in 1837.
- On 27 April 1944, Anglo-American Flying Fortresses took off to raze to the ground Avezzano, then an important railway junction. That day, a thick fog covered the city and therefore the Allied forces headed towards Cassino.

Besides, at the Sanctuary of Pietraquaria, visitors can admire about one hundred ex votos, exposed in the Confraternity's dedicated rooms and donated by those who in the past believed that they had received blessings from the Virgin Mary of Pietraquaria.

== The Confraternity of Maria Santissima di Pietraquaria ==
The Confraternita di Maria Santissima di Pietraquaria ("Confraternity of Most Holy Mary of Pietraquaria") was founded in 1891. Since 1878 the sanctuary has been run by Capuchin Friars, and before them by lay hermits who settled in the monastery erected in 1840. The 1915 Marsica earthquake caused heavy damages to the sanctuary, while the monastery could host the religious people who had come to the aid of the survivors.

On the occasion of the 30th anniversary of Pope John Paul II's visit to the Marsican land (24 March 1985), the Avezzano Pro Loco (local promotion association) in accordance with the Confraternity of Maria Santissima di Pietraquaria inaugurated a mosaic, made by artist Rita Monaco, portraying Pope Karol Wojtyla and a reliquary containing some memorabilia from the visit preserved as relics.

In August 2018 it was announced that Capuchin Friars would not run the sanctuary anymore, due to the growing organizational difficulties related to the monks' old age and the reduction in the number of vocations. Subsequently, however, the news was denied, and as of November 2018, the sanctuary official website still reports Capuchin Friars' presence.

== Description ==
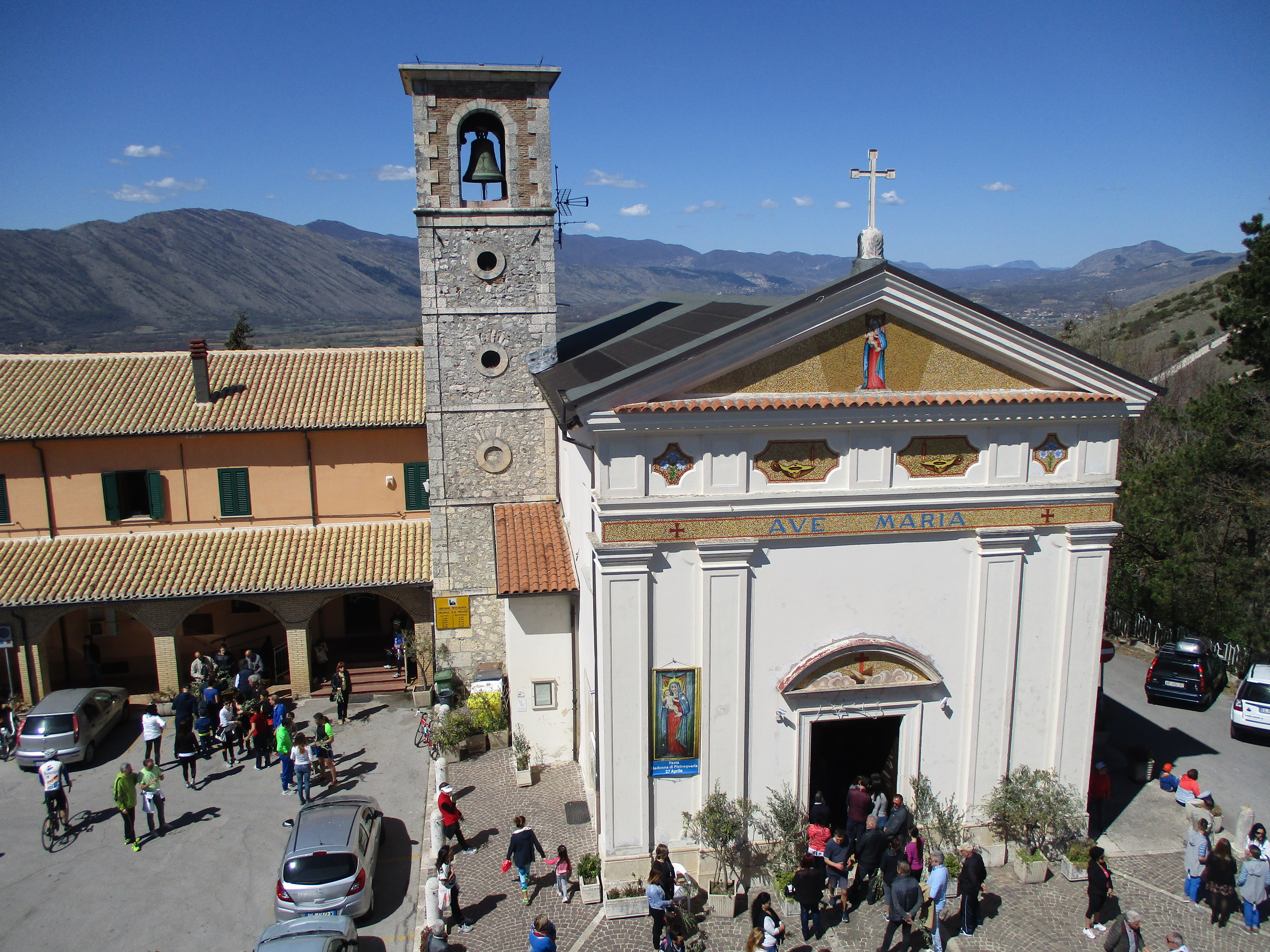
Façade and bell tower

=== Exterior ===
The church plan is Latin cross-shaped with a single nave. The façade is white-plastered with four small buttresses supporting a gold mosaic cornice with the writing "AVE MARIA".

The architrave is also decorated with a mosaic dedicated to the Madonna. The bell tower on the left is a tower without a spire in unhewn stone. Next to the bell tower a portico unwinds, ending in an irregular rectangular building which is Capuchin Fathers and pilgrims' house. Attached to it the Domus Mariae (Latin: "House of Mary") stands, built in the 1950s and used for spiritual retreats, whose care is entrusted to Benedictine Sisters of Charity.

=== Interior ===
Inside, the church features a single nave, with white-plastered vaults. The apse is much enlarged with geometrical decorations. On the whole, altars are three with two other niches. Some frescoes reproduce the scenes of the miracles performed by the Virgin; outstanding is the large original painting depicting the Madonna and Child placed in an onyx niche on the end wall of the apse. The stained-glass windows were made in 1992 by artist Marcello Ercole.

== See also ==
- Madonna di Pietraquaria
- Roman Catholic Diocese of Avezzano

== Bibliography ==
- Bontempi, Pietro (1972). Santuari d'Abruzzo. Sotto l'aspetto religioso, storico, artistico e folkloristico (in Italian). Casamari: Tipografia dell'Abbazia. SBN IT\ICCU\SBL\0378265.
- Brogi, Tommaso (1954). Il santuario ed il castello di Pietraquaria nella Marsica (in Italian). Rome: Istituto Grafico Tiberino. SBN IT\ICCU\AQ1\0055216.
- Febonio, Muzio (1678). Historiae Marsorum (libri tres) (in Latin). Naples: Michaelem Monachum. SBN IT\ICCU\SBLE\003381.
