= Monte Salviano =

Italian mountain

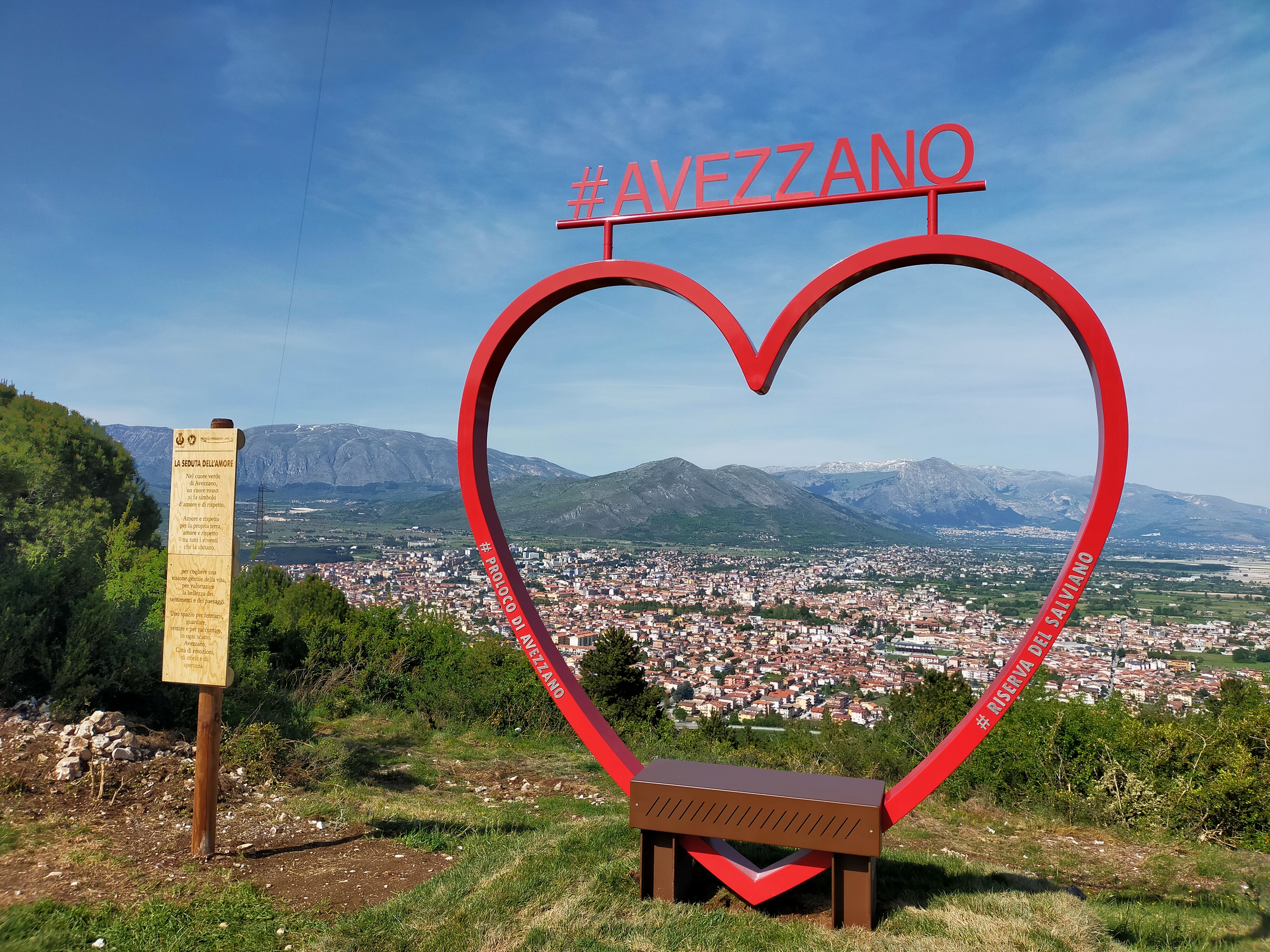
- View of Avezzano from Monte Salviano

Highest point
- Elevation: 1,011 m (3,317 ft)
- Coordinates: 42°01′54.9″N 13°24′04.4″E

Geography
- Location within Italy
- Location: Abruzzo, Italy
- Parent range: Apennines

Monte Salviano ([ˈmonte salˈvjaːno]) is a massif in the Abruzzo Apennines, Central Italy. It includes the peaks of Monte d'Aria (1,011 m (3,317 ft)), Monte Cimarani (1,108 m (3,635 ft)) and Monte San Felice (1,030 m (3,380 ft)). Since 1999 the area, falling within the municipal territory of Avezzano (Province of L'Aquila), has been included in the Riserva Naturale di Monte Salviano.

== Description ==
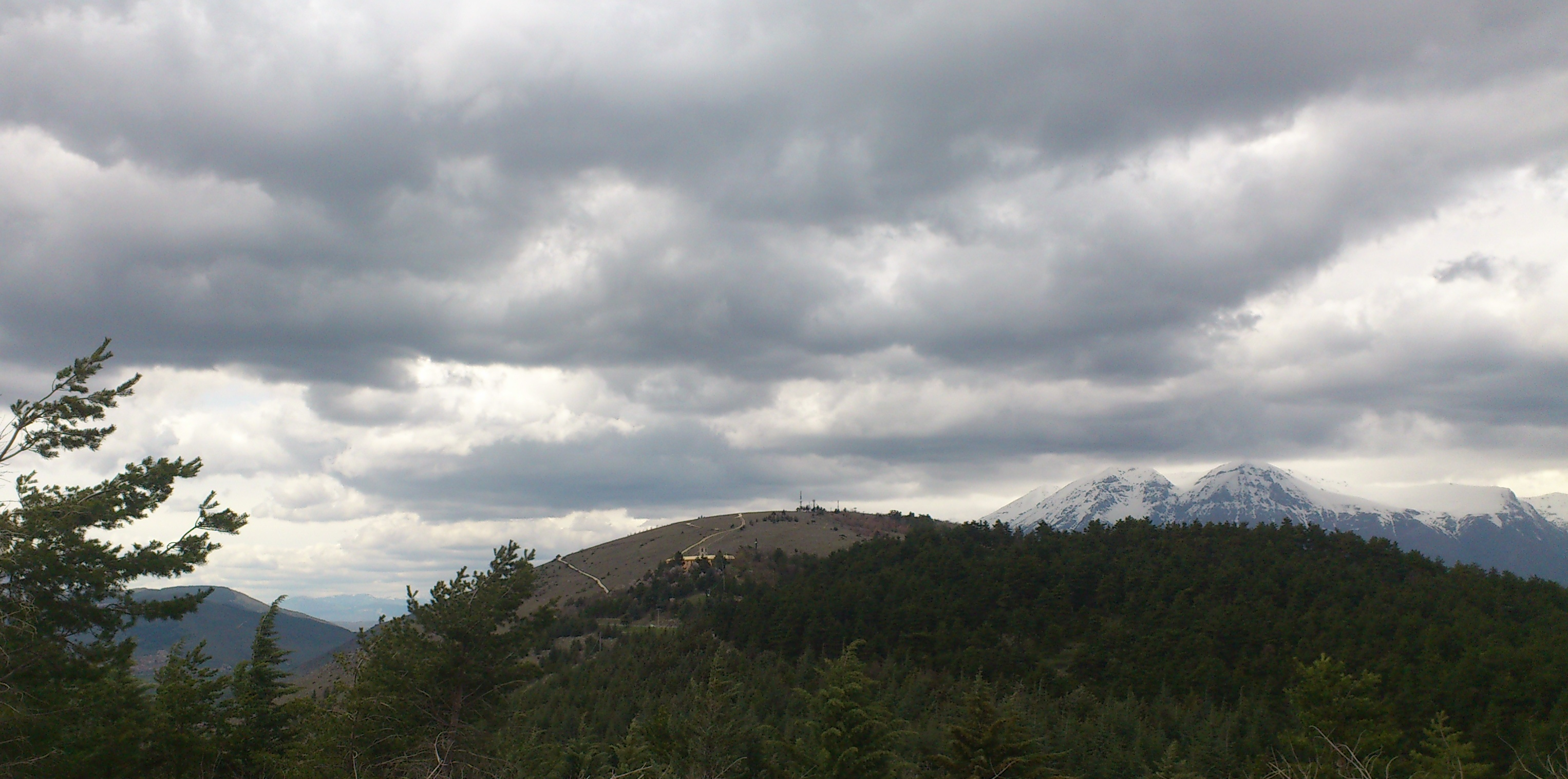
View of Pietraquaria and Monte Velino from Salviano

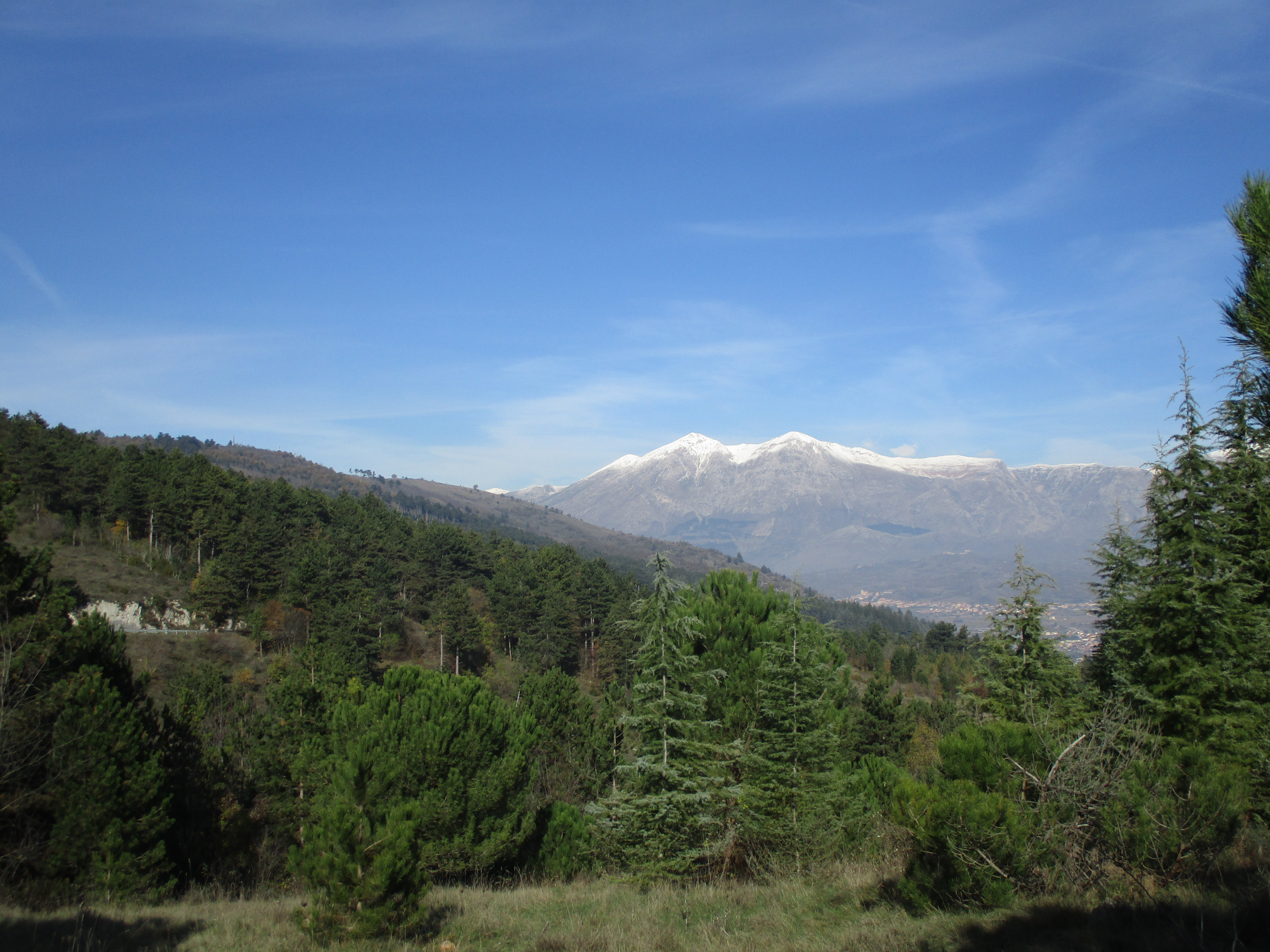
View of the Salviano pinewood

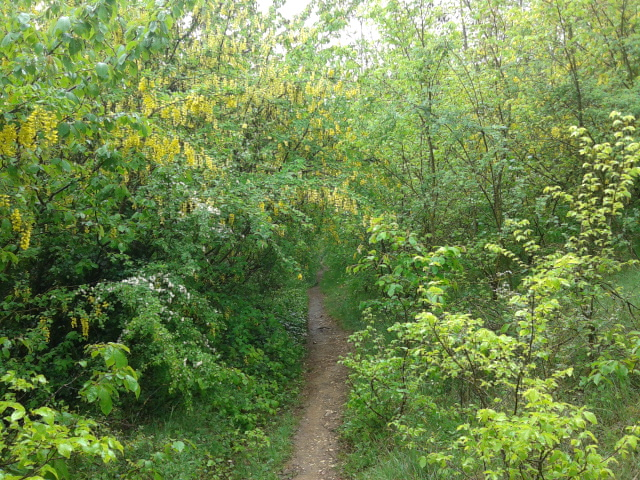
A trail in Monte Salviano

The Salviano mountain range is situated along the watershed between the Fucino basin and the Piani Palentini, in Marsica. In 1993 a serious fire burnt down dozens of hectares of black pine in the pinewood planted by the prisoners of Avezzano concentration camp in 1916. Ecological restoration, carried out through the reforestation of native and indigenous species, favoured the process of spontaneous regeneration consolidating the mountain area ecosystem.

Since 1999, the Avezzano side entirely falls into the Riserva Naturale di Monte Salviano, a former peri-urban park.

In 2005 Monte Salviano was indicated among Abruzzo sites of community importance.

=== Etymology ===
There are two hypotheses about the origin of the name "Salviano": the first links the toponym to the remarkable presence of Salvia officinalis on the mountain; the other traces it back to the finding of some epigraphs explicitly referring to the gens Salvia in the Marsican area.

=== View from the peak ===
From the Monte Salviano peak it is possible to admire the Monte Velino peaks in the north, the Piani Palentini in the west, and the Fucino basin, surrounded by the Monti Marsicani, in the east.

== Cartography ==
- Trail network of the Riserva Naturale di Monte Salviano, available on line
- Italian official cartography of the Istituto Geografico Militare in a scale 1:25.000 and 1:100.000, available on line
