= Cese dei Marsi =

Coordinates: 42°02′28″N 13°26′23″E

- Frazione
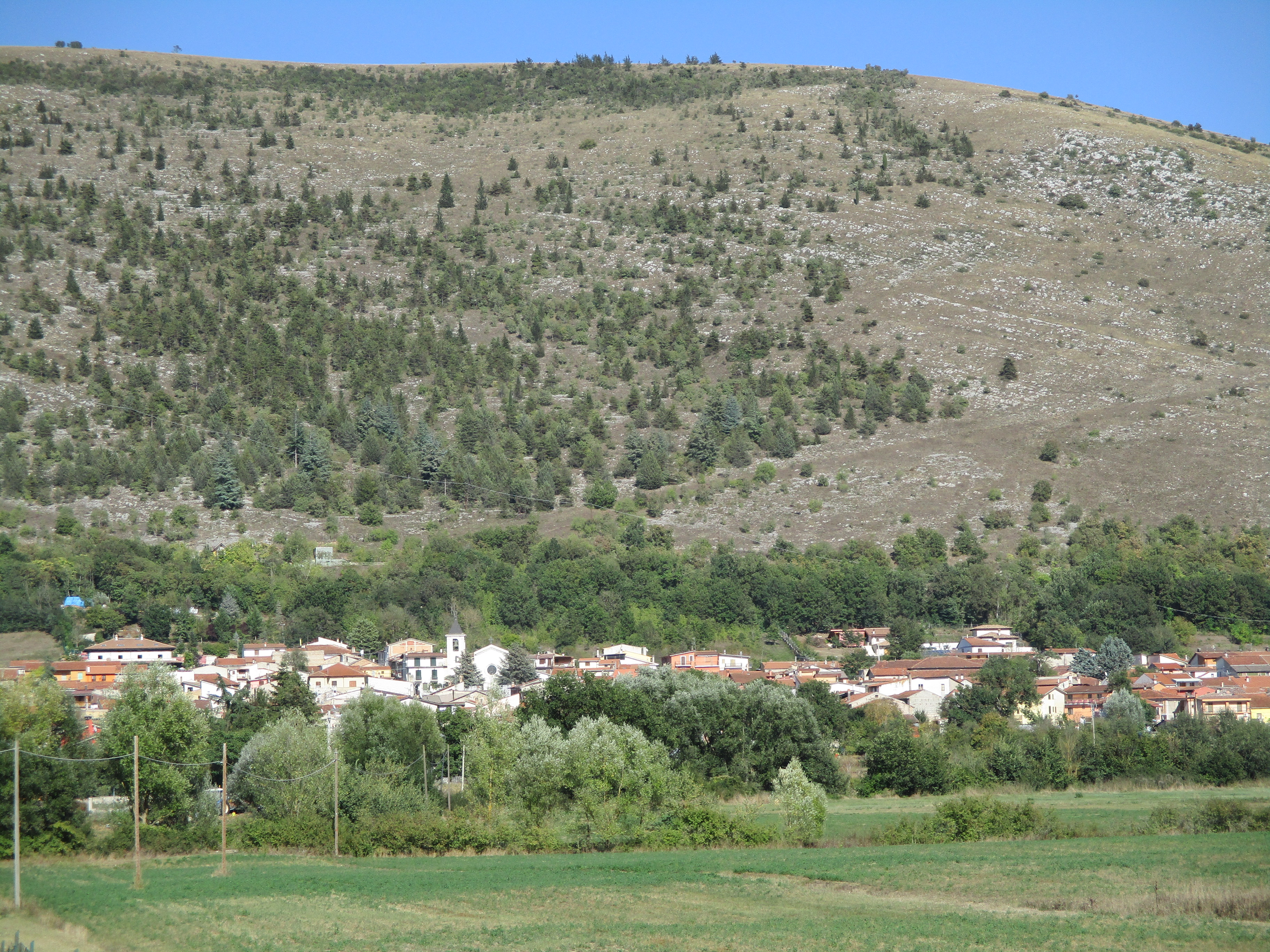
- Cese dei Marsi view
- Interactive map of Cese dei Marsi
- Country: Italy
- Region: Abruzzo
- Province: L'Aquila
- Commune: Avezzano
- Time zone: UTC+1 (CET)
  - Summer (DST): UTC+2 (CEST)

Cese dei Marsi (Marsicano: Le Cese) is a frazione of the Avezzano comune, in the Marsica subregion (Province of L'Aquila, Abruzzo, Italy).

In 1915, a violent series of earthquakes hit the region. The village parish church, Santa Maria di Cese, was severely damaged, including the altarpiece.
