= Muzio Febonio =

Italian priest and historian

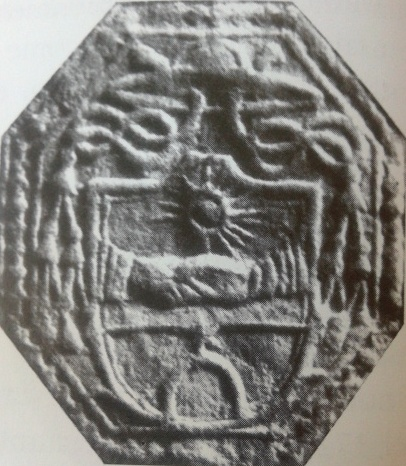
- Muzio Febonio's hoctagonal seal
- Born: 13 July 1597
- Died: 3 January 1663 (aged 65)
- Occupation: Historian

Muzio Febonio (13 July 1597 – 3 January 1663) was an Italian priest and historian, best known for his historical and hagiographic works about Marsica, the Abruzzo sub-region where he was born. In his writings he made extensive use of archive documents and historiographic and archaeological sources, showing a deep knowledge of them, although in a somewhat formal and pedantic style. However, his works represent a valuable source of information for later historians, even if their publication occurred with a lot of errors and delays, which partly explains the limited fame this author enjoyed.

== Biography ==
Vedere all'intorno gran memorie antiche e vestigi di più lochi

—Muzio Febonio
Translation:

Seeing around great ancient memories and vestiges of several places

He was born in Avezzano, Abruzzo. He completed his studies in Rome where he obtained a PhD in law before taking up theological studies and an ecclesiastical career. Febonio came, in 1626, to obtain the office of apostolic protonotary. He became the abbot of Saint Cesidius Church in Trasacco in 1631 and the property administrator of the Colonna family in Marsica. Here he began to devote himself to the historical and geographical studies of his own land since it was lacking in historical summaries and documentation.

In 1648, Febonio settled first in Sulmona, where he obtained the post of general vicar of the cathedral and then, in 1651, in L'Aquila for the same position. During the troubled stay in L'Aquila he received several accusations, later totally dropped, from the vicar of St. Cesidius' Chair in Trasacco, including those of simony and murder. Misunderstandings and contrasts will arise with the new Aquilan bishop, Spanish Francesco Tellio de Leon, elected in 1654, which will prove irremediable.

From 1660, after some years without posts when he devoted himself to scholarly studies with a greater commitment, he was partnered with the vicar of the Diocese of Veroli.

The first draft of the precious Historiae marsorum (Latin: History of the Marsi) would date back just to 1660, however, the work, made of three books, was terminated between 1661 and 1662, and in all likelihood, after some months, so was the revision with the stylistic corrections suggested by historian Ferdinando Ughelli, also considered by Febonio as a master of erudition. He spent the last years of his life in his native town as general vicar of Marsi diocese, finally partnering with the vicar of Pescina, where he died after a short disease.

== Selected works ==
The main works are listed below:

- Vita dei gloriosi Martiri San Cesidio e San Rufino (Life of the Glorious Martyrs St. Cesidius and St. Rufinus, 1643)
- S. Bartolomeo Apostolo (St. Bartholomew the Apostle, 1651)
- L'amore divino due volte bendato (The Twice Blindfolded Divine Love, 1653)
- Lettere dirette a Ferdinando Ughelli (Letters Addressed to Ferdinando Ughelli, 1660)
- Historiae Marsorum (History of Marsi, 1661-1662)
- Vita di San Berardo e di altri santi della diocesi de' Marsi (The Life of St. Berardus and Other Saints of the Marsi Diocese, 1973)

== See also ==
- Ferdinando Ughelli

== Bibliography ==
- Pignatti, Franco (1995). "Muzio Febonio". Dizionario Biografico degli Italiani (in Italian).
- Buonocore, Marco (1998). "Muzio Febonio storico dell'antichità e la sua incorrupta fides". Proceedings from the Avezzano Conference, 9–10 May 1998 (in Italian). Edizioni L'Aquila 2000.
- Morelli, Giorgio (1998). Muzio Febonio nel quarto centenario della nascita (1597-1997) (in Italian). Avezzano: Edizioni Colacchi.
