= Term of address =

Term of address may refer to:

- Style (form of address), an official or legally recognized form of address for a person, often used with a title
- Title, one or more words used before or after a person's name
- Name or nickname, a term used for identification of a person, thing, or class of things
- Noun of address, a phrase identifying the person being addressed

== See also ==
- Address (disambiguation)
- Addressee (disambiguation)
- Title (disambiguation)
- Honorific, a title that conveys esteem, courtesy, or respect when addressing or referring to a person
- T–V distinction, contextual use of different pronouns to convey formality or familiarity in some languages
