= Byzantine mosaics =

Style of art

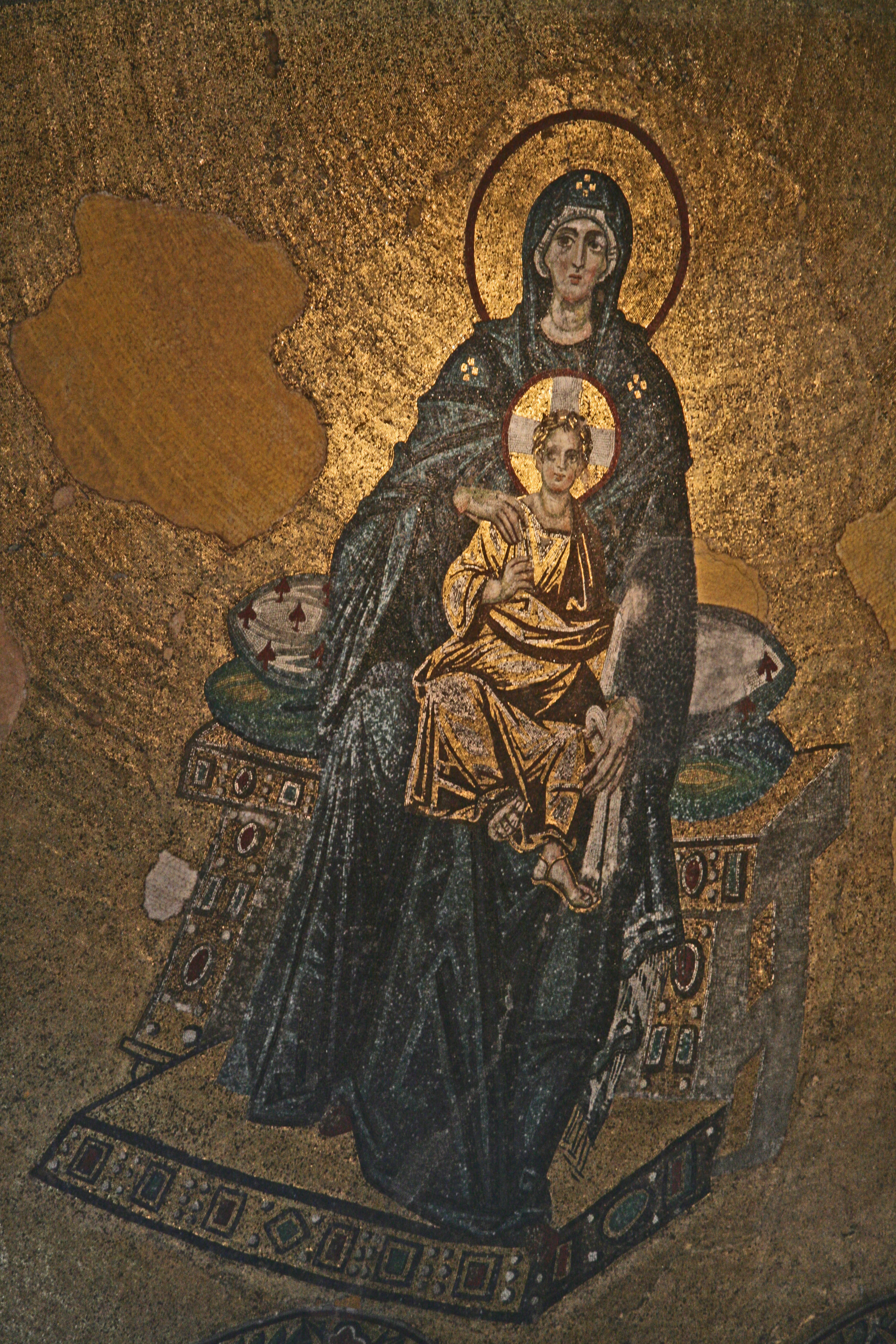
10th century mosaic of Virgin and Child on a gold ground in the former cathedral Hagia Sophia in Istanbul, Turkey

Byzantine mosaics are mosaics produced from the 4th to 15th centuries in and under the influence of the Byzantine Empire. Mosaics were some of the most popular and historically significant art forms produced in the empire, and they are still studied extensively by art historians. Although Byzantine mosaics evolved out of earlier Hellenistic and Roman practices and styles, craftspeople within the Byzantine Empire made important technical advances and developed mosaic art into a unique and powerful form of personal and religious expression that exerted significant influence on Islamic art produced in the Umayyad and Abbasid Caliphates and the Ottoman Empire.

There are two main types of mosaic surviving from this period: wall mosaics in churches, and sometimes palaces, made using glass tesserae, sometimes backed by gold leaf for a gold ground effect, and floor mosaics that have mostly been found by archaeology. These often use stone pieces, and are generally less refined in creating their images. Survivals of secular wall-mosaics are few, but they show similar subject matter to floor mosaics, where many of the subjects are very similar in both churches and houses; it was not acceptable for images of sacred figures to be walked upon. Religious mosaics show similar subject matter to that found in other surviving religious Byzantine art in painted icons and manuscript miniatures. Floor mosaics often have images of geometrical patterns, often interspersed with animals. Scenes of hunting and venatio, arena displays where animals are killed, are popular.

Byzantine mosaics went on to influence artists in the Norman Kingdom of Sicily, in the Republic of Venice, and, carried by the spread of Orthodox Christianity, in Bulgaria, Serbia, Romania and Russia. In the modern era, artists across the world have drawn inspiration from their focus on simplicity and symbolism, as well as their beauty.

== Historical context ==
Byzantine mosaics can trace their origin to the Greek tradition of road-building, since Greek roads were often made using small pebbles organized into patterns. By the Hellenistic Period, floor and wall art made of natural pebbles was common in both domestic and public spaces. Later, as the Roman Empire expanded and became the dominant cultural force in the Mediterranean and Near East, Roman artists were heavily influenced by the Greek art they encountered and began installing mosaics in public buildings and private homes throughout the empire. They also added small clay or glass pieces called tesserae, material that was also in use during the Hellenistic period. The use of tesserae enabled artists to create more colorful and finely detailed images.

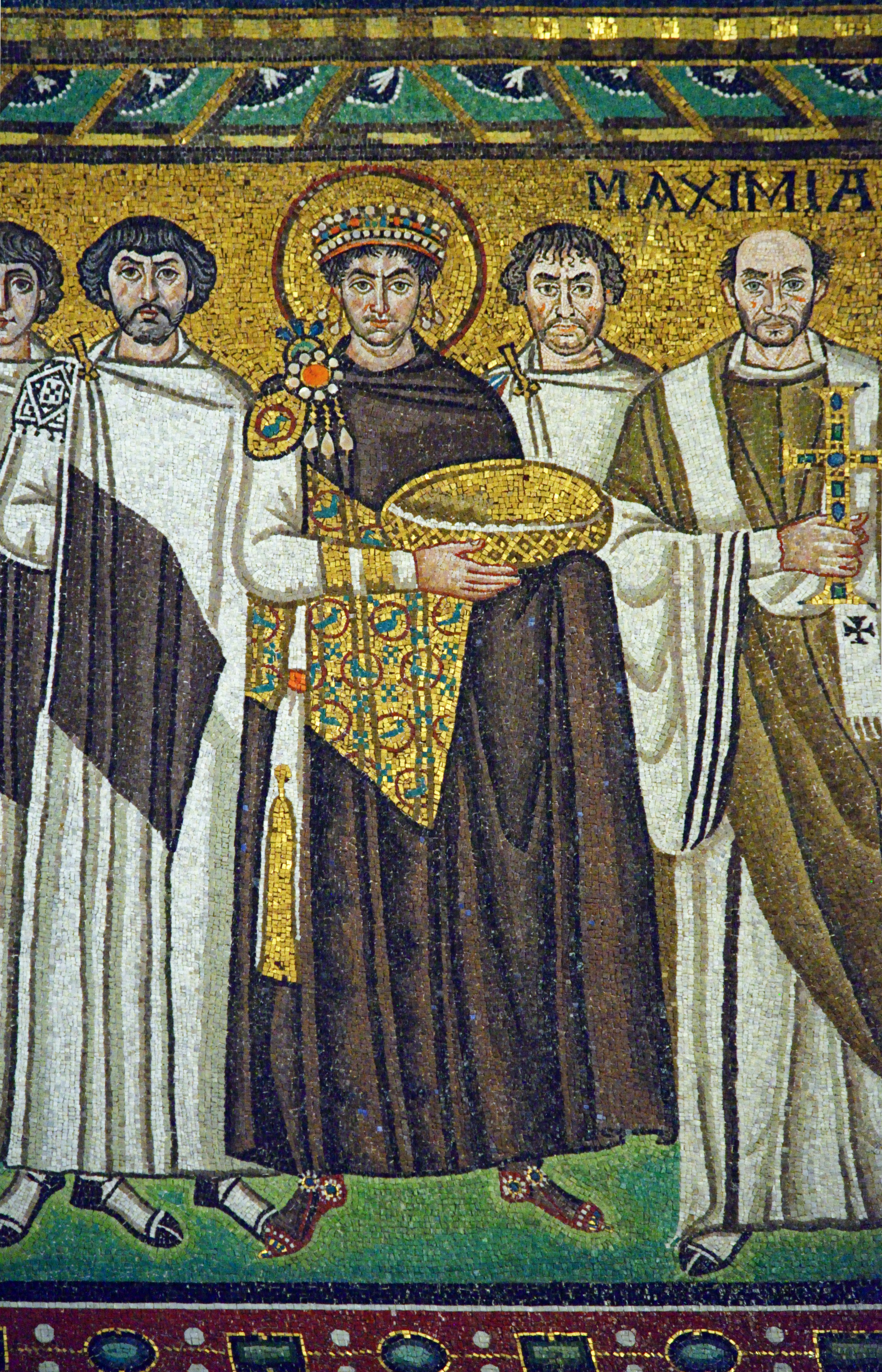
Justinian I, as depicted in mosaic in the Basilica of San Vitale, Ravenna, Italy

In 330 AD, the emperor Constantine moved the empire's capital from Rome to Byzantium (modern-day Istanbul), renaming it Constantinople after himself. Historians generally use this date for the beginning of the Byzantine Empire and divide Byzantine art into three historical periods: Early (c. 330–750), Middle (c. 850–1204) and Late (c. 1261–1453).

== The early period ==
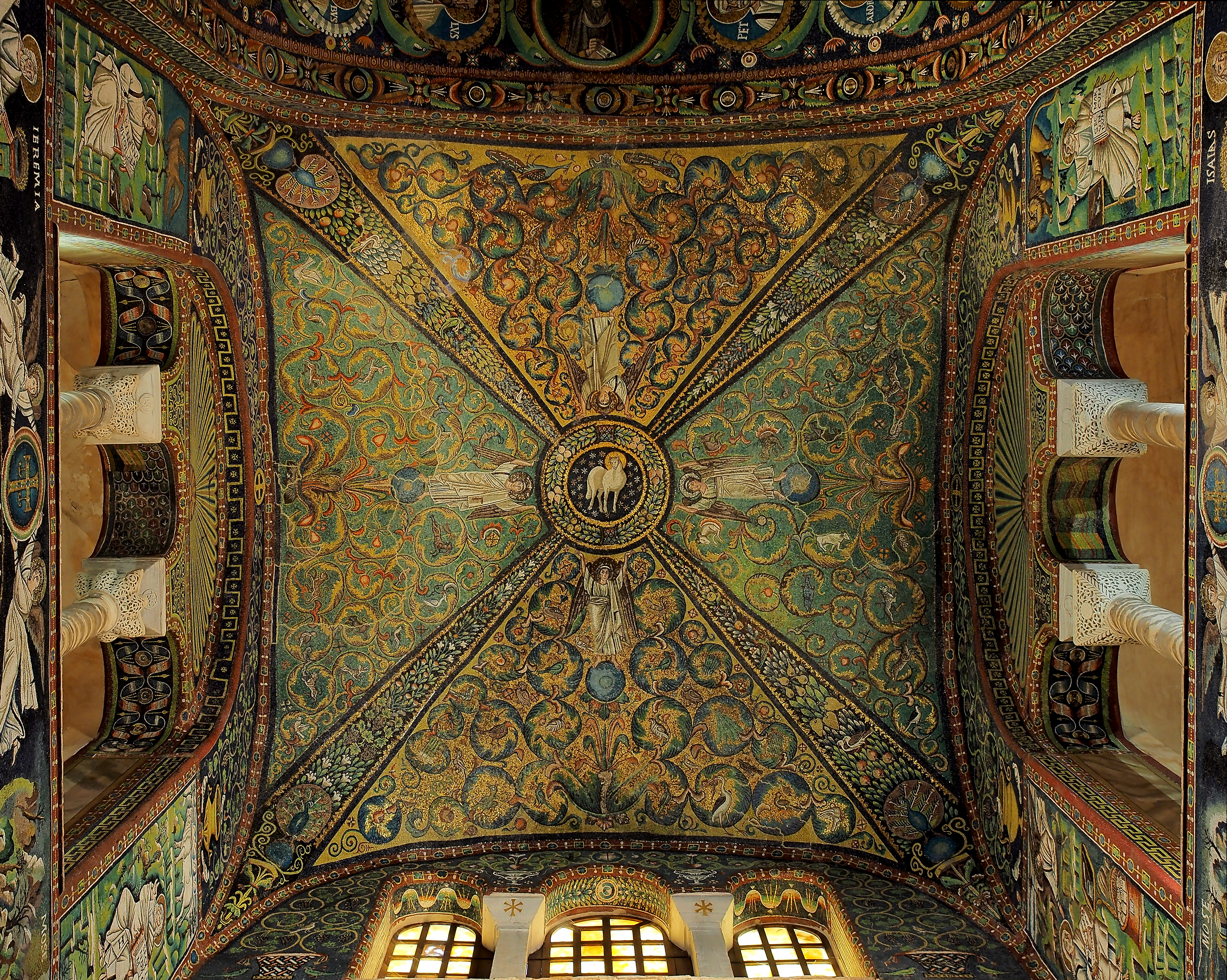
Sixth century mosaic ceiling of the Basilica of San Vitale in Ravenna, Italy

Constantine's conversion to Christianity led to extensive building of Christian basilicas in the late 4th century, in which floor, wall, and ceiling mosaics were adopted for Christian uses. The earliest examples of Christian basilicas have not survived, but the mosaics of Santa Constanza and Santa Pudenziana, both from the 4th century, still exist. In another great Constantinian basilica, the Church of the Nativity in Bethlehem, the original mosaic floor with typical Roman geometric motifs is partially preserved.

The reign of Justinian I in the 6th century coincided with the first golden age of the Byzantine Empire. In 537, he completed the construction of a new patriarchal cathedral in the capital city of Constantinople that would be the global center of the Orthodox Church: the Hagia Sophia. At the time, it was the world's largest building and considered the epitome of Byzantine architecture. The cathedral was decorated throughout with what were undoubtedly some of the most incredible figurative mosaics of this time period, but unfortunately these were all destroyed during the Iconoclasms that followed. The oldest mosaics that exist today in Hagia Sophia date from the 10th through the 12th centuries, not this earlier period.

After Rome was sacked, Ravenna became the capital of the Western Roman Empire from 402 until 476, when the empire collapsed after being conquered by Theodoric the Great and the Ostrogoths. While Ravenna was under Gothic control, Arian patrons had embarked upon a notable building program of chapels and baptisteries in Ravenna. In 535, the city was conquered by Justinian I, who created the Exarchate of Ravenna, effectively making Ravenna the seat of Byzantine power on the Italian Peninsula. Orthodox bishops under Justinian continued and expanded the construction of basilicas to the adjacent port city of Classe, commissioning some of the finest mosaics anywhere in the world. Surviving monuments, some of which predate Exarchate, include the Basilica of San Vitale, the Archiepiscopal Chapel, the Arian Baptistry, the Neonian Baptistry, the Mausoleum of Galla Placidia, the Basilica Sant’Apollinare Nuovo, the Mausoleum of Theodoric and the Basilica of Sant'Apollinare in Classe. All eight of these monuments have been inscribed on the UNESCO World Heritage list as superb examples of early Christian mosaic art.

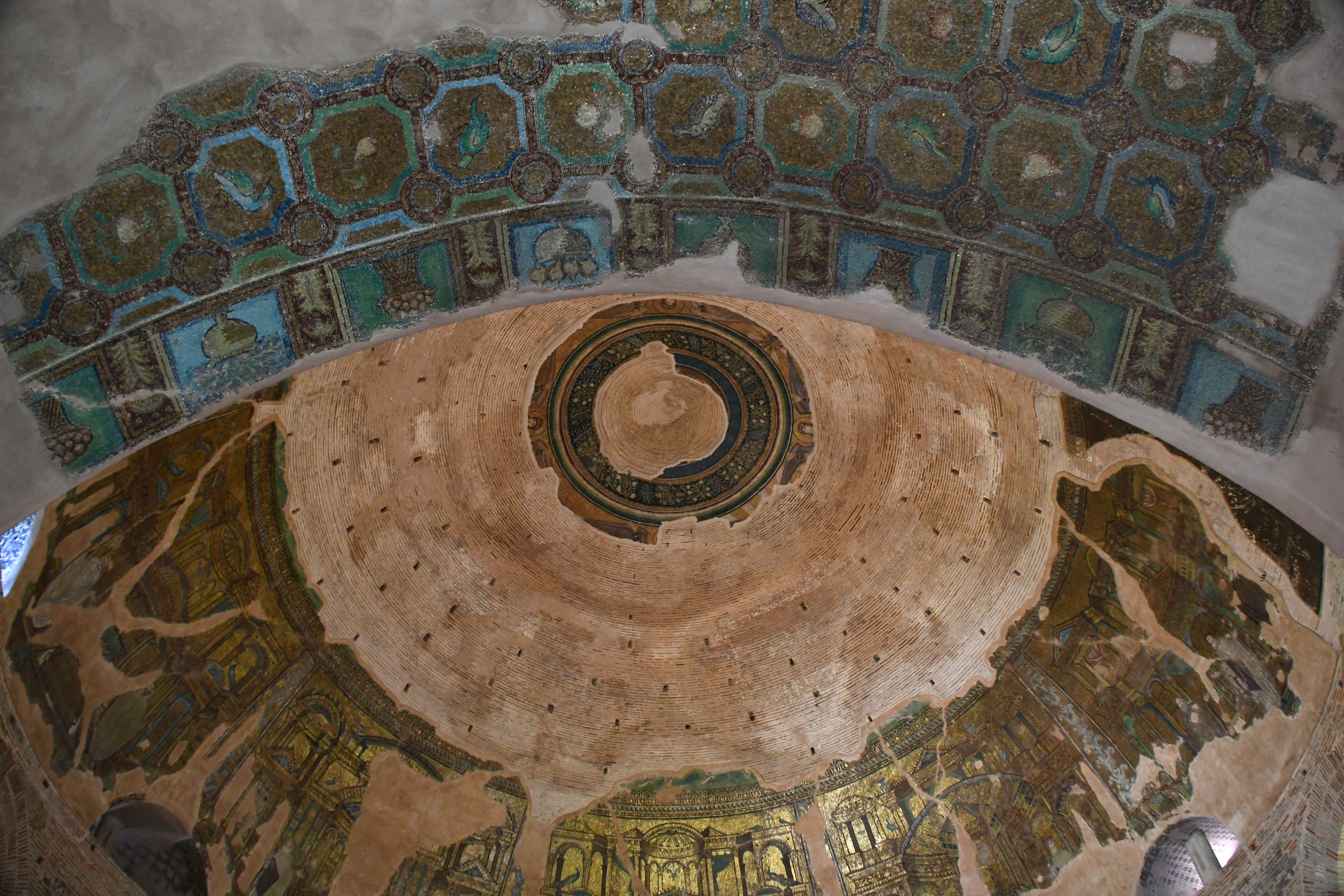
4th century mosaics in the Rotunda in Thessaloniki, Greece, which are some of the earliest remaining examples of early Christian mosaic art

Although it might be the most famous, Ravenna is by no means the only place where Early Byzantine mosaics are well-preserved today. The city of Thessaloniki in Greece was the second most important city in the empire in terms of both wealth and size, and like Ravenna its early Christian monuments have been designated UNESCO World Heritage sites. Masterpieces of early mosaic art in Thessaloniki include the Church of Hosios David, the Hagios Demetrios, and the Rotunda.

In addition, archeological discoveries in the 19th and 20th centuries unearthed many Early Byzantine mosaics in the Middle East, including the Madaba Map in Jordan as well as other examples in Egypt, Lebanon, Syria, Israel, and Palestine.

== The Iconoclasm ==
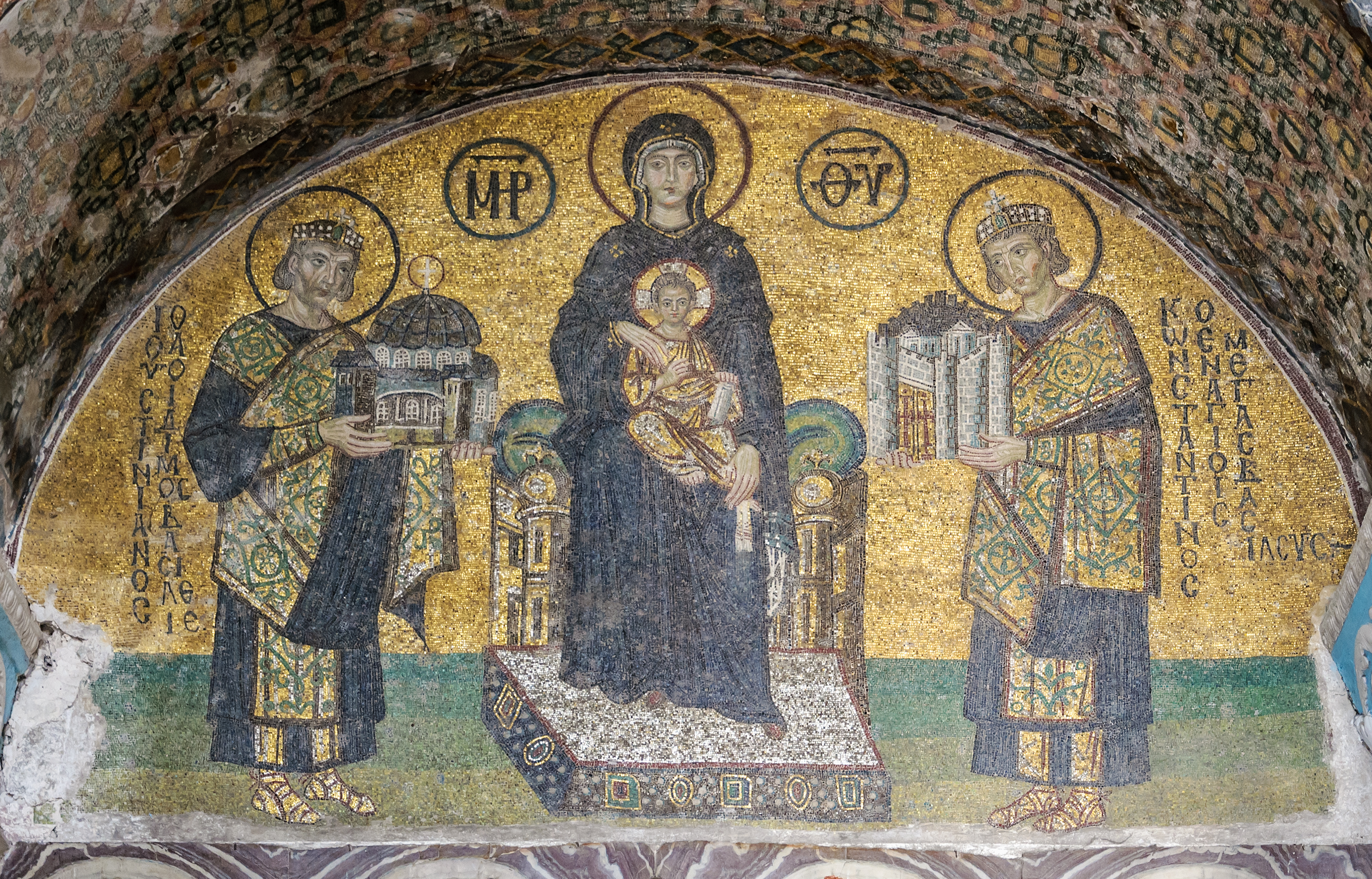
10th century mosaic in the Hagia Sophia in Istanbul, Turkey

The events that mark the division between early and middle Byzantine art are called the Iconoclastic Controversies, which took place from 726 to 842. This period is defined by a deep skepticism towards icons; in fact, Emperor Leo III placed an outright ban on the creation of religious images, and authorities within the Orthodox Church encouraged the widespread destruction of religious art, including mosaics. As a result, the iconoclastic period drastically reduced the number of surviving examples of Byzantine art from the early period, especially large religious mosaics.

== Middle and Late Byzantine mosaics ==
Following the Iconoclasm, Byzantine artists were able to resume creating religious images, which people accepted not as idols to be worshiped, but as symbolic and ceremonial elements of religious ritual spaces. The first part of this period, from 867 to 1056, is sometimes called the Macedonian Renaissance and is seen as the second golden age of the Byzantine Empire. Churches throughout the empire, and especially the Hagia Sophia in Constantinople, were redecorated with some of the finest examples of Byzantine art ever created. For instance, the monasteries at Hosios Loukas, Daphni, and Nea Moni of Chios have all been recognized as UNESCO World Heritage Sites, and they contain some of the most magnificent Byzantine mosaics from this period.

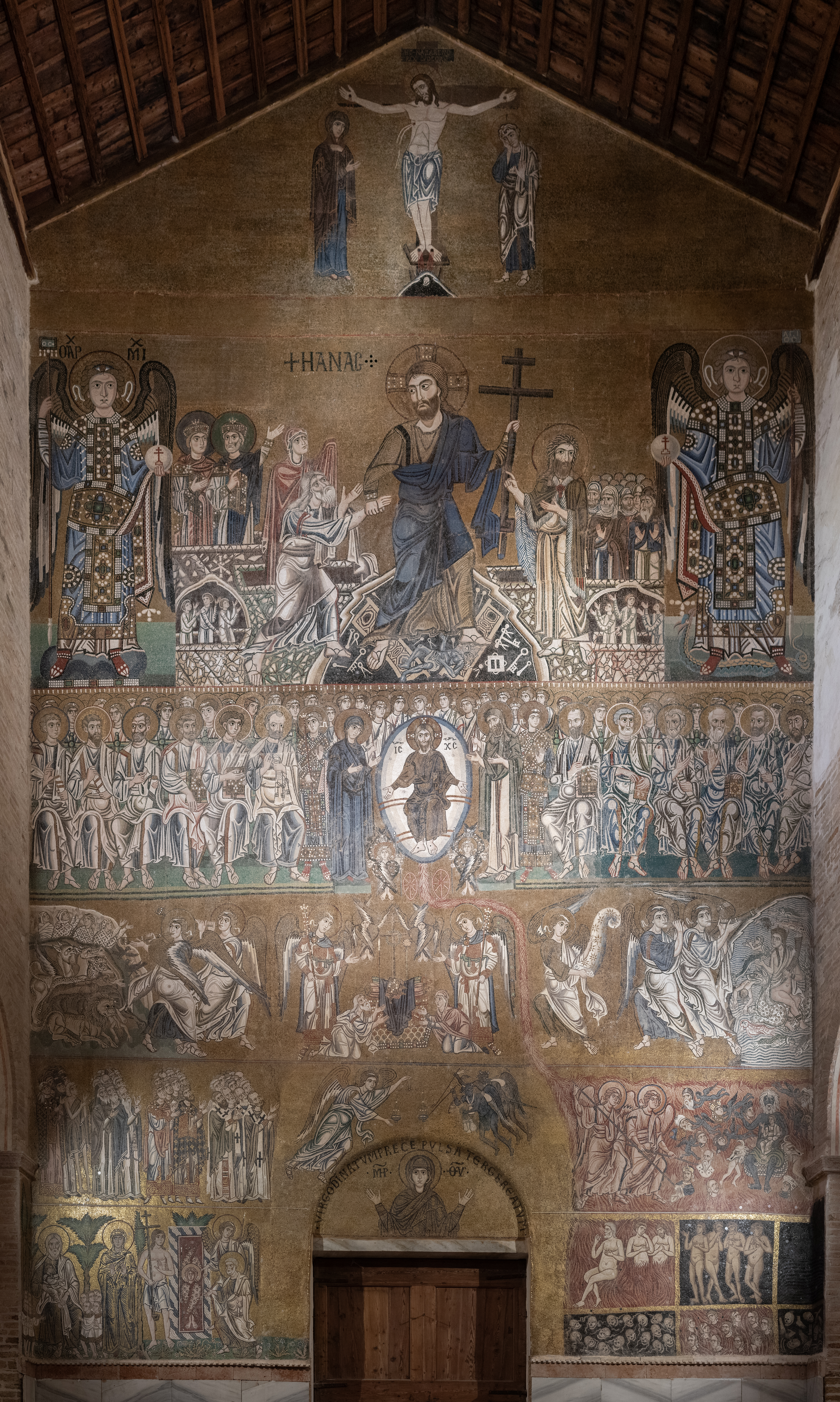
11th century mosaic by Byzantine artists in Torcello Cathedral, Venice, Italy

Until the disastrous sack of Constantinople in 1204 at the hands of the Fourth Crusader Army, Byzantium was seen by many in Europe as the last light of civilization due to its inherited legacy of Rome and continued cultural sophistication. So during the 10th and 11th centuries, even states that were at odds with the Byzantine Empire imitated Byzantine style and sought out Greek artists to create religious mosaic cycles. For instance, the Norman King Roger II of Sicily was actively hostile to Byzantium, but he imported Greek craftspeople to create the mosaics for Cefalù Cathedral. Similarly, the earliest surviving mosaics in St. Mark's Basilica in Venice were probably created by artists who had left Constantinople in the mid-11th century and also worked at Torcello Cathedral.

== Techniques ==
Like other mosaics, Byzantine mosaics are made of small pieces of glass, stone, ceramic, or other material, which are called tesserae. During the Byzantine period, craftsmen expanded the materials that could be turned into tesserae, beginning to include gold leaf and precious stones, and perfected their construction. Before the tesserae could be laid, a careful foundation was prepared with multiple layers, the last of which was a fine mix of crushed lime and brick powder. On this moist surface, artists drew images and used tools like strings, compasses, and calipers to outline geometric shapes before the tesserae were carefully cemented into position to create the final image.

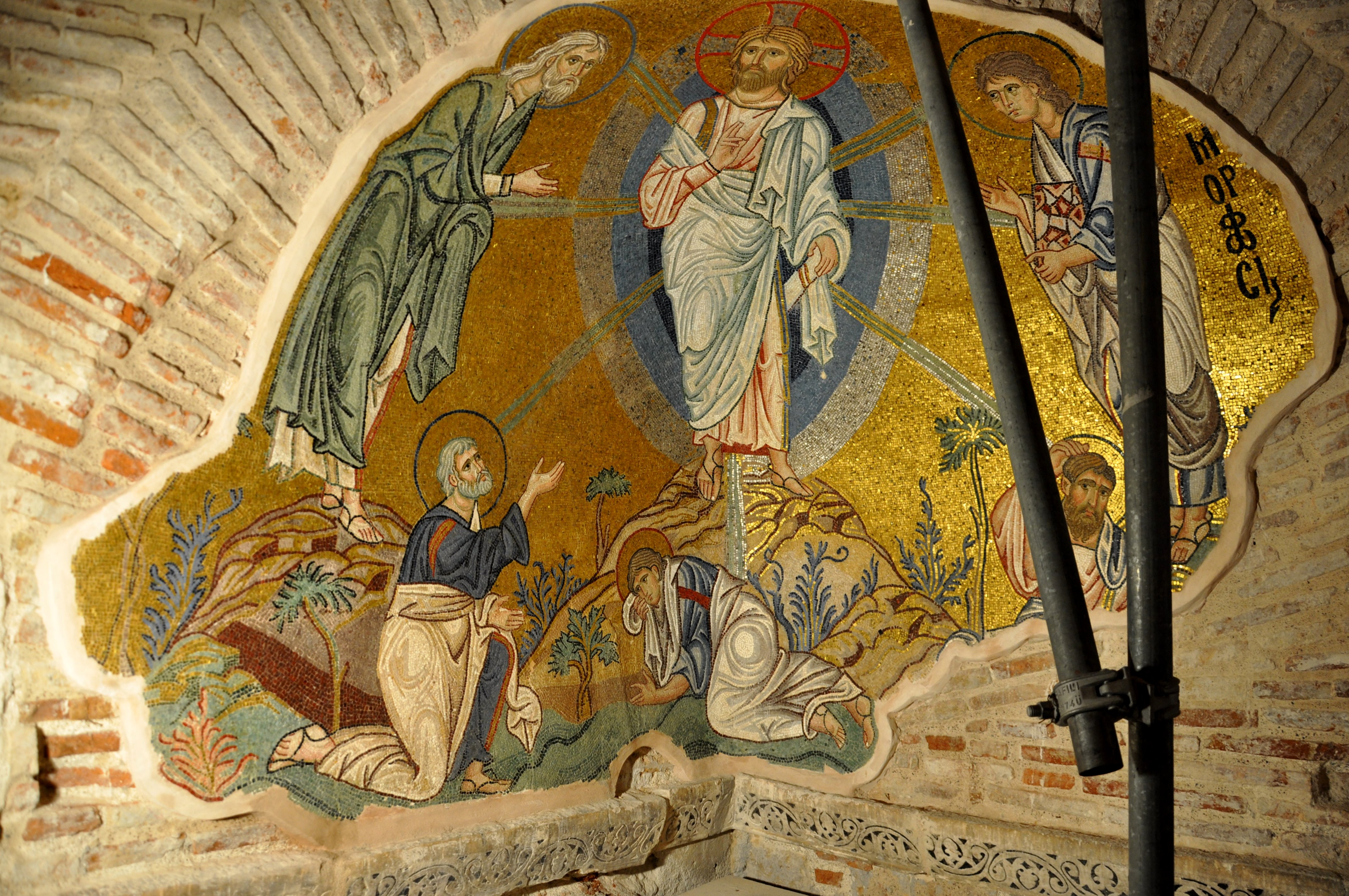
11th century Byzantine mosaic of Daphni Monastery in Haidari, a suburb of Athens, Greece

== Aesthetics ==
In Byzantine religious art, unlike the Classical Greek and Roman art that preceded it, symbolism became more important than realism. Instead of concentrating on making the most realistic images possible, mosaic artists of this time wanted to create idealized and sometimes exaggerated images of what existed inside the soul of a person. In addition, when used in a religious space, the overall effect created by a sea of glittering, brightly colored and gilded tesserae took precedence over literal realism. The goal of the artist was to create an overall feeling of awe, of being in a spiritual realm, or even the sense of being in the presence of God. Details were not supposed to distract from the main themes.

However, not all Byzantine mosaics were religious in nature. In fact, mosaic art was commonly used to decorate the floors and walls of public and private spaces with geometric patterns and secular figurative subjects.

== Influence and legacy ==
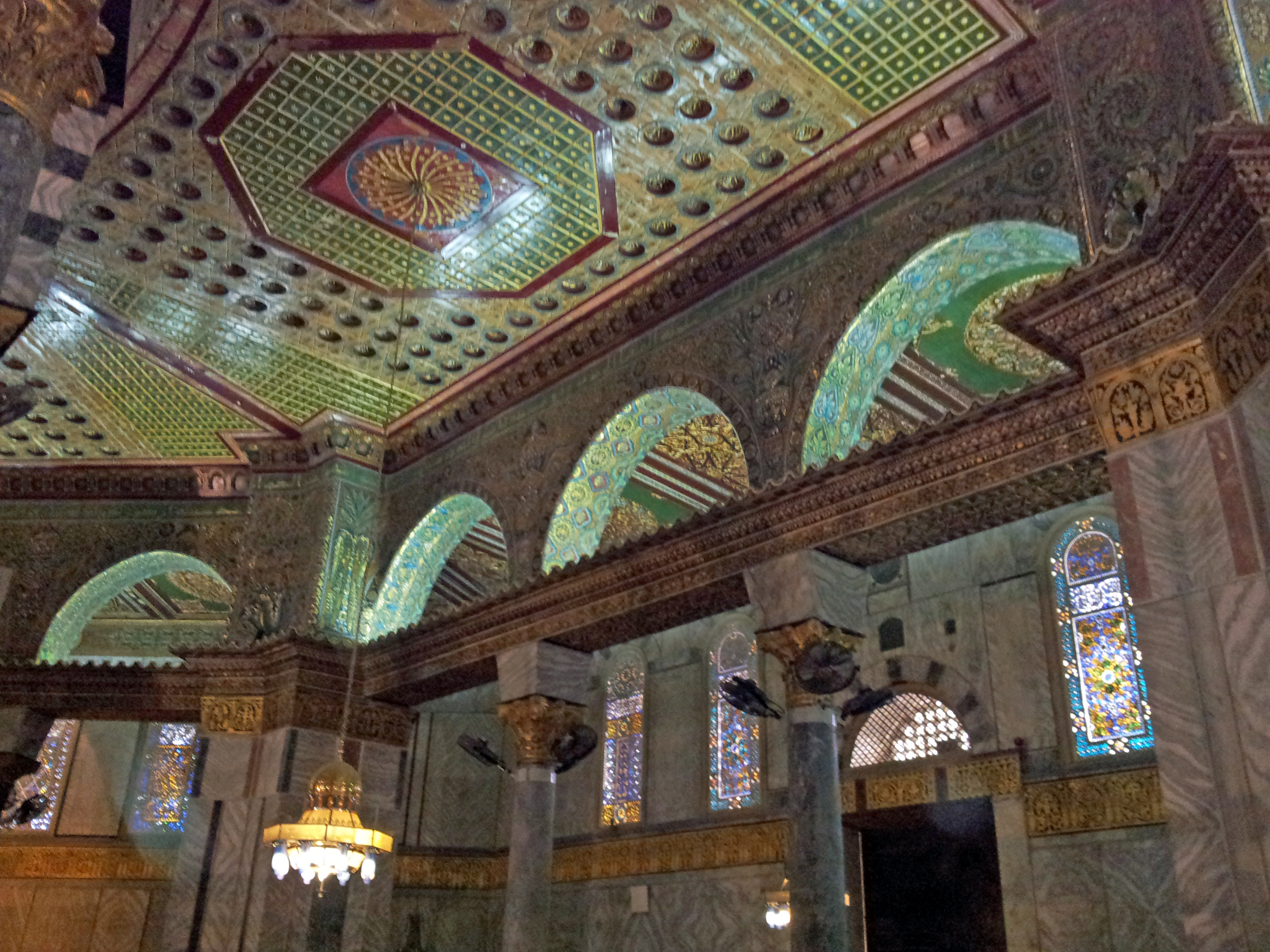
The mosaics in the Dome of the Rock in Jerusalem show the influence of Byzantine designs

Some Western art historians have dismissed or overlooked Byzantine art in general. For example, the deeply influential painter and historian Giorgio Vasari defined the Renaissance as a rejection of "that clumsy Greek style" ("quella greca goffa maniera"). However, Byzantine artists and their mosaics in particular were highly influential on the rapidly expanding Islamic decorative arts, on Kievan Rus', and modern and contemporary artists across the world.

Islamic art began in the 7th century with artists and craftsmen mostly trained in Byzantine styles, and though figurative content was greatly reduced, Byzantine decorative styles remained a great influence on Islamic art.

As Eastern Orthodox Christianity spread northward and eastward, the Byzantine empire became economically and culturally tied to Kievan Rus'. In the late 10th century, Vladimir the Great introduced Christianity with his own baptism and, by decree, extended it to all inhabitants of Kiev. By the 1040s, Byzantine mosaic artists were working in the Hagia Sophia at Kiev, leaving a lasting legacy not only on Russian decorative arts but also medieval painting.

== See also ==
- Byzantine architecture
- Byzantine art
- Mosaic Fragment with Man Leading a Giraffe (Art Institute of Chicago)
- Icon of Christ of Latomos
