= Title (disambiguation) =

A title is one or more words used before or after a person's name, in certain contexts.

Title or Titles may also refer to:

== Law ==
- Title (property), a claim or documents about legal ownership
- Short and long titles, the short formal name by which legislation is cited, and the full formal title appearing at the head of the legislation
- One of the 53 divisions of the United States Code

== Names and designations ==
- Title (publishing), the name of a creative work
- Artwork title, the title of a piece of art
- Job title, a designation of a person's position in an organization
- Title of honor, a title bestowed as an award
- Honorary title (academic), a title bestowed in recognition of contribution outside of academic employment
- Hereditary title, a title that remains in a family
- Honorific, a title of esteem used for deference

== Art and entertainment ==
- Title sequence, for opening credits in films
- Intertitle, title cards used in silent films
- Title (EP), a 2014 EP by Meghan Trainor
  - Title (album), a 2015 album by Meghan Trainor (a reissue of the EP, with additional songs)
  - "Title" (song), a song by Meghan Trainor from the album of the same name
- Titles (album), a 1982 Mick Karn album
- The Title, a British rock band
- Title, a 2005 album by Straightener
- Titles, another name for the soundtrack hit song Chariots of Fire by Vangelis

== Computing ==
- Title (command), a command that changes the title of a terminal emulator window
- Title bar, element of a computer window
- <title>...</title>, an HTML element

== Other uses ==
- Title (animal), a competitive signifier on a domesticated animal
- Title (Christianity), the naming of the church first served by an Anglican deacon
- Championship, a high-level sports competition to determine a champion
- Stacy Title (1964–2021), American film director, screenwriter and producer

== See also ==
- Address (disambiguation)
- Subtitle (disambiguation)
- Titular (disambiguation)
- Titulus (disambiguation)
- Titleholder (disambiguation)
- Title case, a capitalization style
- Tittle, a diacritical mark
