= Icon of Christ of Latomos =

Miraculous mosaic icon in Greece

Coordinates: 40°38′30″N 22°57′08.1″E

- The Miracle of Latomos, Icon of Latomos, Greek: Το θαύμα του Λοτομού
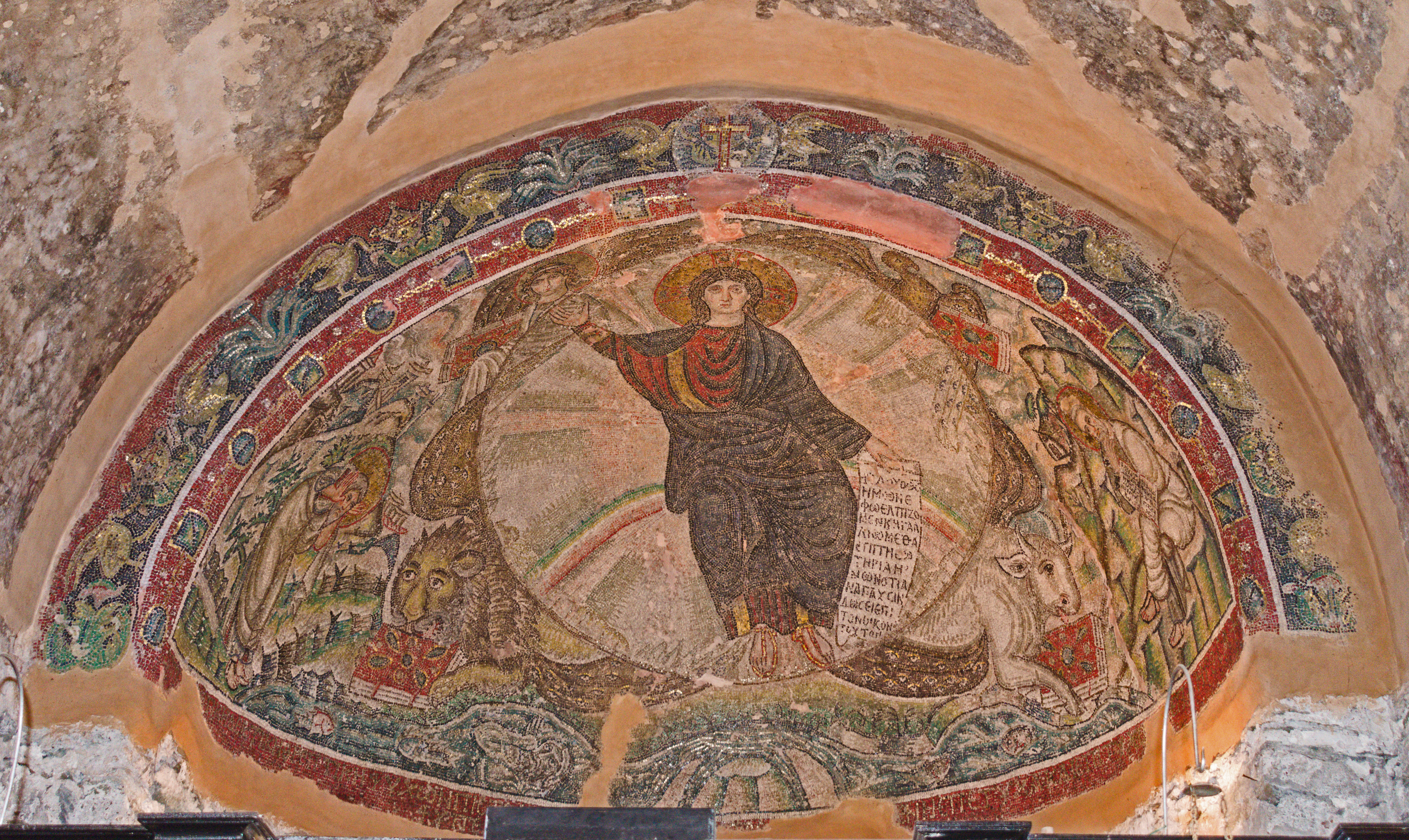
- Artist: Unknown
- Year: 5th century
- Completion date: 5th century
- Medium: Mosaic
- Subject: Jesus Christ and the prophecy of Ezekiel
- Location: Church of Hosios David, Thessaloniki, Greece

The Icon of Christ of Latomos (or Latomou), also known as the Miracle of Latomos, is a 5th-century Byzantine mosaic of Jesus in the monastery of Latomos (now the Church of Hosios David the Dendrite) in Thessaloniki, Greece, that is an acheiropoieton (a religious image that is believed to have been made miraculously). The later legend of this mosaic goes back even earlier, to the late third century AD when Maximian and Diocletian reigned jointly over the Roman Empire. The Icon of Christ of Latomos is one of the lesser-known acheiropoieta (Greek: ἀχειροποίητος εἰκών).

According to tradition, the Icon of Christ of Latomos was discovered by Princess Flavia Maximiana Theodora, the Christian daughter of Emperor Maximian. She hid it to protect it from potential damage by the pagan, Roman authorities, and it remarkably survived Byzantine iconoclasm in the eighth century as well as a period of time in the fifteenth century when the church of Hosios David was converted to an Islamic mosque (during the Ottoman occupation of Thessaloniki). Sometime before the Ottoman occupation and prior to the twelfth century, the mosaic icon was rediscovered by a monk from Lower Egypt. It was again rediscovered in 1921, at which time the building was reconsecrated to Saint David.

Thematically and artistically, the Icon of Christ of Latomos is likely the first of its type, depicting an apocalyptic scene with imagery from the Book of Ezekiel which communicates important theological ideas about the apocalypse.

== History ==
The account of the Miracle of Latomos is recorded in two medieval manuscripts. The first, which tells the story of the initial miracle, is kept in Moscow in the Patriarchal Library (As of 2018). The second manuscript dates back to 1307 and is called the Diegesis manuscript. It was written by Abbott Ignatius of Lotomos monastery, and describes the rediscovery of the icon by Saint Sennuphius of Nitria (venerated March 25).

=== Origin ===
The origin of the mosaic icon most likely dates back to the late third century in the metropolis of Thessaloniki in modern-day Greece. At that time, Byzantium was divided into East and West, ruled by Diocletian and Maximian, respectively. Theodora (286–305?) was either the daughter of Maximian the emperor or August Galerius who ruled over Thessaloniki at that time. Theodora lived slightly before the time of the Diocletianic Persecution, when Christianity was officially pronounced illegal by the imperial government. Nevertheless, at the end of the third century leading up to the official decree, Christians were still met with violence from pagan authorities. Theodora, without the knowledge of her parents, was baptized by Saint Alexander, the Bishop of Thessaloniki (venerated May 28).

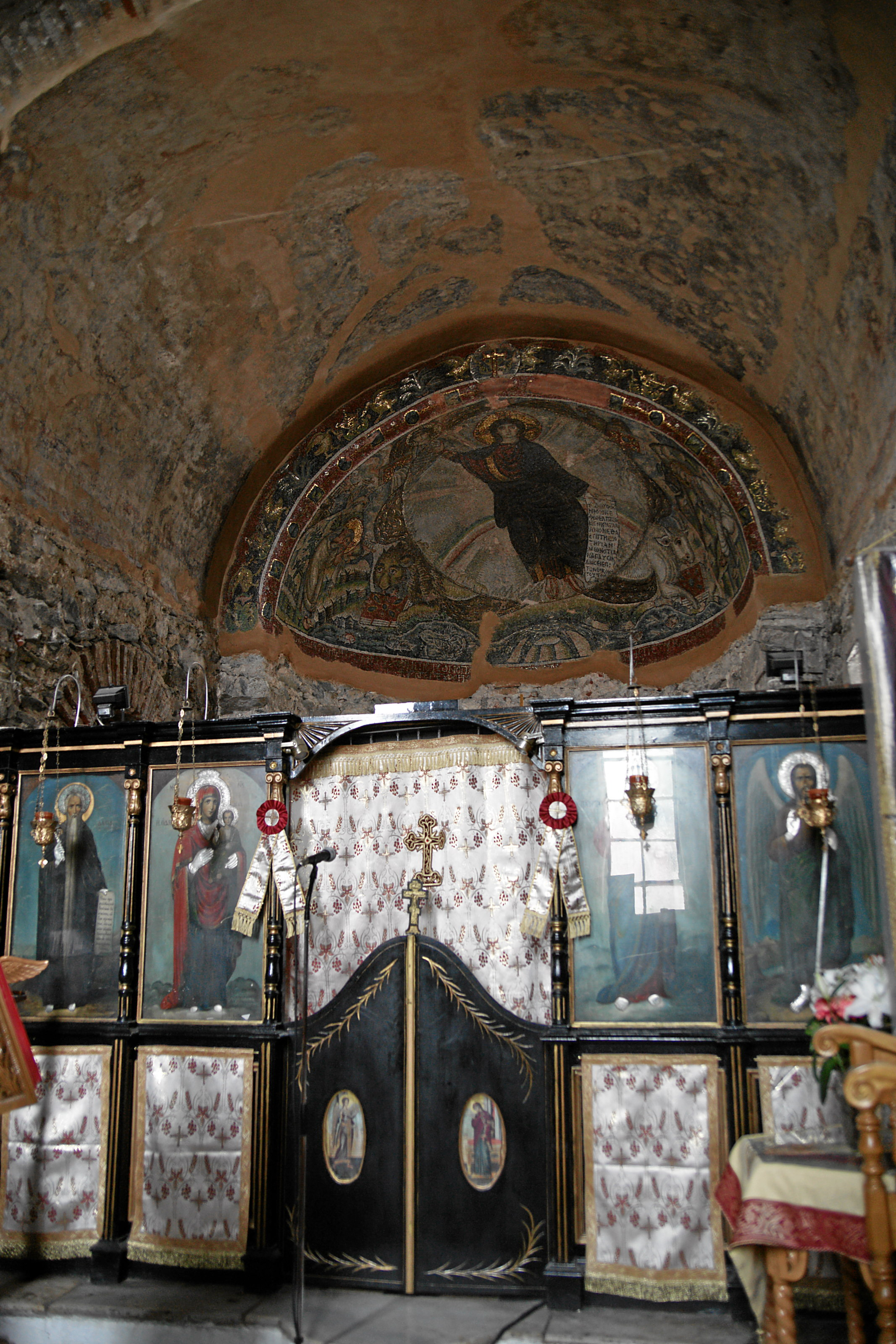
Another view of the icon in Hosios David Church.

Under the pretext that she was ill, Theodora had a bathhouse and palace built for her, the bathhouse containing a semicircular apse. The location of the bathhouse was near Thessaloniki's stone quarries, which is why it was given the name Latomos (Greek: Λατομείο (quarry), romanized: Latomío). Theodora, being a Christian, hired an iconographer to create an image of the Mother of God on the apse. Every day, Theodora visited the palace to see the work that the artist had been doing. One day, to her surprise, the image of the Mother of God was no longer present, and instead on the apse there was a mosaic of an apocalyptic scene featuring Jesus at the center. The iconographer was as puzzled as Theodora was. She pronounced it a miracle and forbade him from changing the mosaic.

When Theodora's pagan mother was informed of the icon by Theodora's servants, Theodora had the entire apse and icon quickly covered with plaster to preserve the image and to hide it from her parents. After Theodora's father returned from battle, he learned of her conversion to Christianity and arrested her, locking her in a tower prison. Refusing to sacrifice to idols, she died as a martyr in 305.

The Icon of Christ of Latomos remained hidden underneath the plaster for a period of time after Theodora's death. Some time after Christianity was made legal in 313 by Constantine I's Edict of Milan, the bathhouse of Theodora was converted into a church and eventually into a monastery. Nevertheless, the mosaic icon still remained hidden and unknown. Because of its survival during the Byzantine iconoclasm of the early eighth century, it seems that the plaster remained up for a substantial amount of time.

=== Sennuphius' discovery ===
In the Diegesis manuscript of the twelfth century, Abbott Ignatius of the monastery of Latomos continues the history of the Icon of Christ of Latomos by relating the story of the monk Sennuphius (Greek: Σεννούφιος). Sometime after 820, this monk lived as an austere ascetic of the Nitrian Desert (Lower Egypt) where Christian monasticism had been established by Anthony the Great and Pachomius. It is unclear whether or not this Sennuphius is the Sennuphius (often called the "Standard-bearer") who is commemorated on March 25 in the Orthodox Church. Regardless, the Diegesis states that Sennuphius the monk constantly prayed to God to receive a vision of how Christ would appear at his Second Coming.

One day, Sennuphius received a vision that informed him that he would be granted to see an image of the Second Coming, as he had desired. The vision told him to leave Egypt and travel to the monastery of Latomos in modern-day Thessaloniki, Greece. Sennuphius was obedient to the vision and travelled to Greece. Legend says that he travelled there the first time and, not finding the image, returned to Nitria, only to again receive another vision and to again travel back to Greece. Regardless, he eventually ended his journey at the monastery of Latomos. While he was in the nave, an earthquake purportedly shook which caused all of the plaster to fall off of the mosaic icon that had been sealed up by Theodora.

As he sat alone one day in the sanctuary of the Stonecutters’ Monastery, suddenly there was a storm and an earthquake and, moreover, thunder and such a disturbance that it seemed the very foundations of the sanctuary were shaken. And immediately the plaster and the brickwork and the oxhide that overlaid the sacred representation of the Lord... were stripped off and fell to the earth. Those sacred features of Christ appeared, shining with fiery appearance like the sun in the midst of the cloud. When the old monk, standing in the midst of the sanctuary, saw this, he cried out, "Glory to you, O God, I thank you!" (The Diegesis as quoted in the book In Search of Early Christians).

Upon seeing the icon, Sennuphius surrendered his soul, died in the church, and was buried there. The discovery that Sennuphius made entered into Thessalonikan lore, causing Abbott Ignatius to write about it later in the twelfth century.

=== Ottoman occupation and rediscovery ===
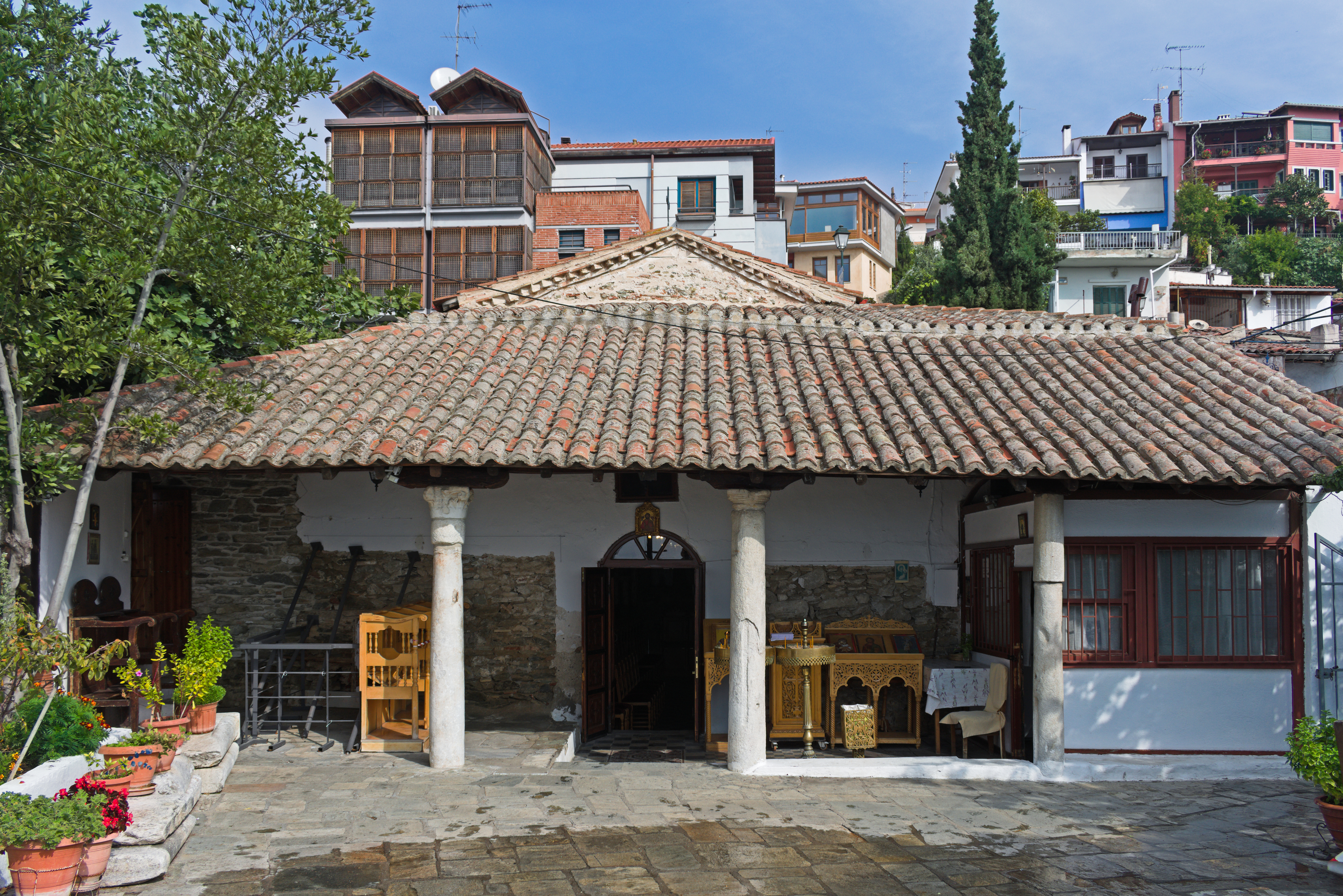
The modern Church of Hosios David in Thessaloniki, Greece.

After 1430 when the Ottoman Turks had captured Thessaloniki, the monks of Latomos abandoned their monastery. When Thessaloniki was returned to Greek rule in 1912, the monastery was listed as one of those that had not survived. Saluca Mosque, which stood on the northeastern side of Thessaloniki, was identified in 1917 as the former Church of Hosios David, and in 1921 was reconsecrated to the local Saint David the Tree-Dweller.

When Andreas Xyngopoulos, who was the Superintendent of Byzantine Antiquities in Thessaloniki in 1921, visited the church, he was able to see a portion of the mosaic where the plaster had fallen off (this time, plaster from the Turks). In 1927, Xyngopoulos conducted a research team and Charles Diehl recognized that the mosaic was the same mosaic described in Abbot Ignatius’ account from 1307. From this, they surmised that the former Mosque was in fact the ancient Latomos monastery Katholikon. Xyngopoulos dated the mosaic icon to the last quarter of the 5th century, and his date was generally accepted. The icon has been hailed as a masterpiece of Christian art and theology.

=== Modern ===
In 1988, the church and mosaic icon were designated as one of the Paleochristian and Byzantine monuments of the Thessaloniki UNESCO World Heritage Sites. Informational signage outside of the church identifies the icon as "one of the city's most significant early Christian monuments and, overall, of early Christian art."

== Iconographic composition ==
=== Composition ===
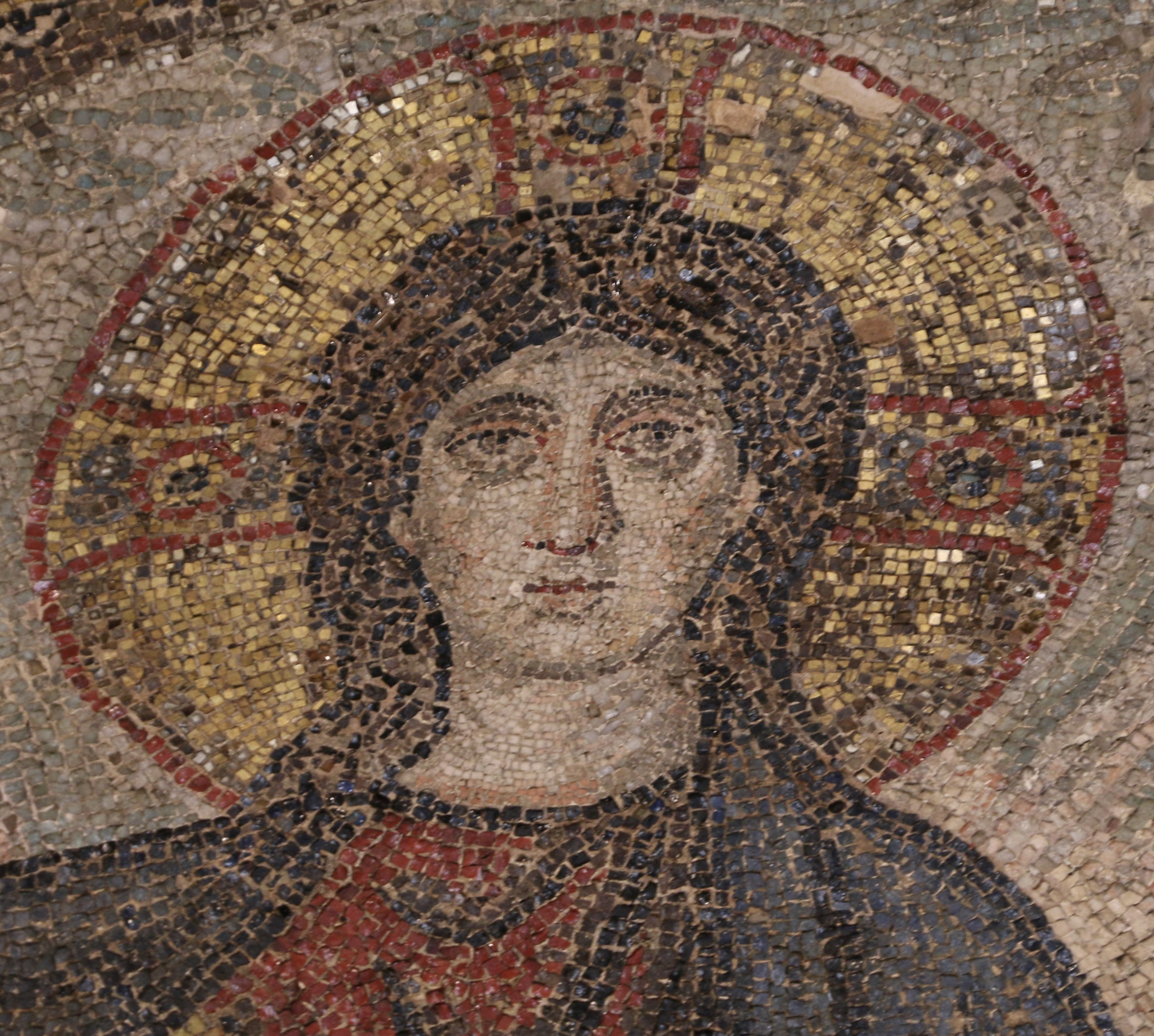
Detail of the beardless face of Christ in the Latomos icon.

Due to the Icon of Christ of Latomos' enigmatic origin, "Researchers have differing interpretations of this composition." The artistic style is speculated to be from the Palaeologan Period, starting in 1261. In form, the mosaic icon presents an image of Christ in the center, surrounded by an aureole of light and sitting upon a rainbow. Remarkably, the image of Christ does not have a beard, which was uncommon in the Byzantine iconography of the time. This possibly suggests youth. Surrounding the aureole are four creatures holding the Gospel books from the Book of Revelation, which represent the four Gospel writers.

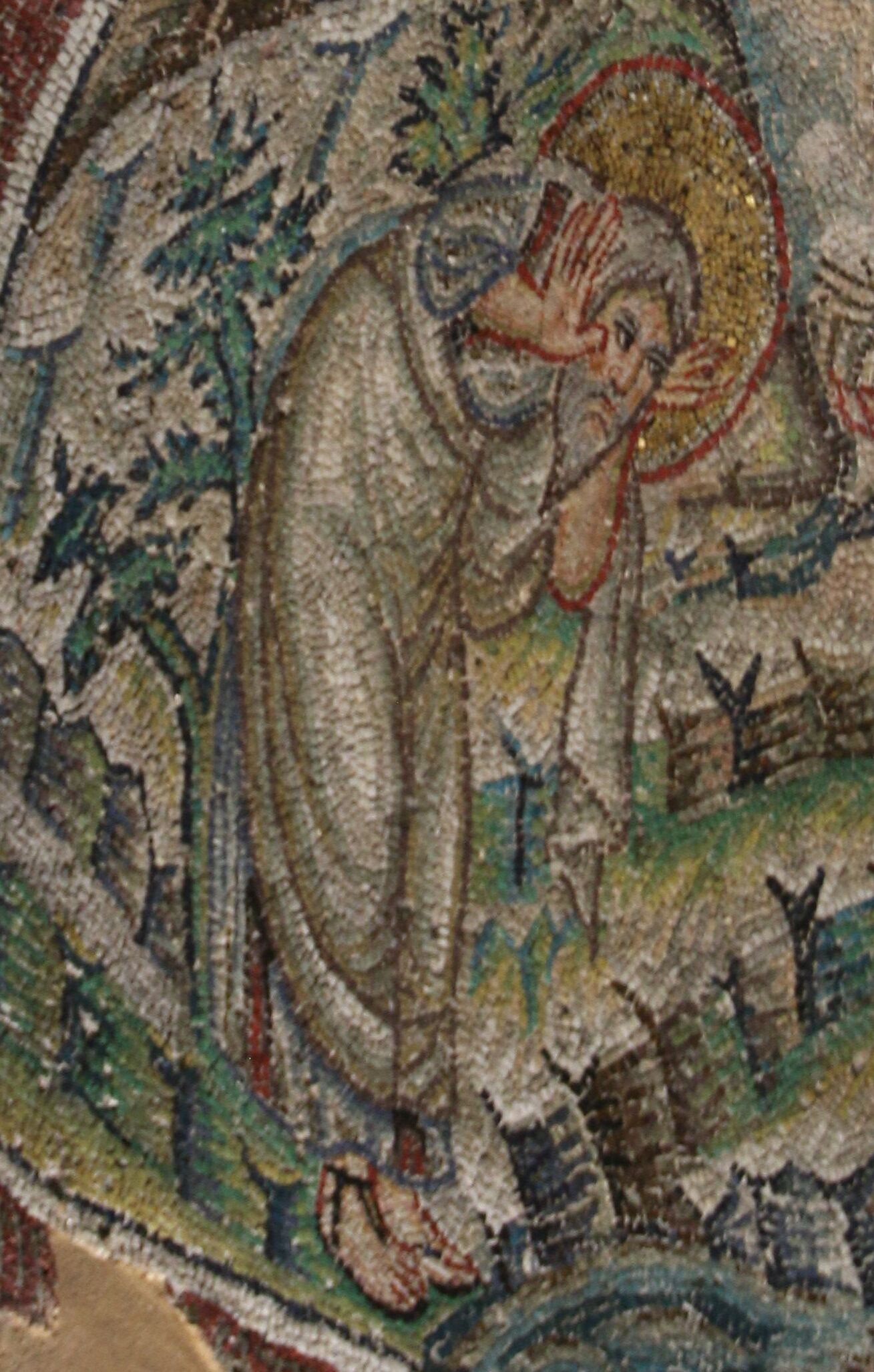
Detail of the figure on Christ's right, his hands raised in a sign of amazement.

The image of Christ is surrounded by a rocky landscape that funnels down into four rivers (representing the four rivers of Paradise according to the Stavros Niarchos Foundation and Migrations in Visual Art.) to a lake with seven fish in it. On either side of the image of Christ are two figures; one standing with hands raised and the other sitting with his chin in his palm and an open book in his lap.

=== Text in image ===
In Christ's hand is a scroll which reads Isaiah 25:9 in Greek :

ἰδοὺ ὁ θεὸς ἡμῶν ἐφ᾽ ᾧ ἐλπίζομεν καὶ ἠγαλλιώμεθα ἐπὶ τῇ σωτηρίᾳ ἡμῶν ὅτι ἀνάπαυσιν δώσει ἐπὶ τὸν οἶκον τοῦτον

The English translation is, "Behold our God in whom we hope and rejoice in our salvation, he will give rest to this house." On the open book held by the figure on the right is the Greek text:

Πηγή ζωτική, δεκτική, θρεπτική / ψυχῶν πιστοῦν ὁ πανέν(τι)μος οἶ(κ)ος ο(ὗ)τος

This text does not originate from the Bible or any other known source. In English, it says, "This most honorable house (is) a life-giving, welcoming, nourishing spring for the souls of the faithful." The mention of a house in this verse possibly refers to the house mentioned in the verse from Isaiah, thus uniting the two texts within the image.

== Interpretation ==
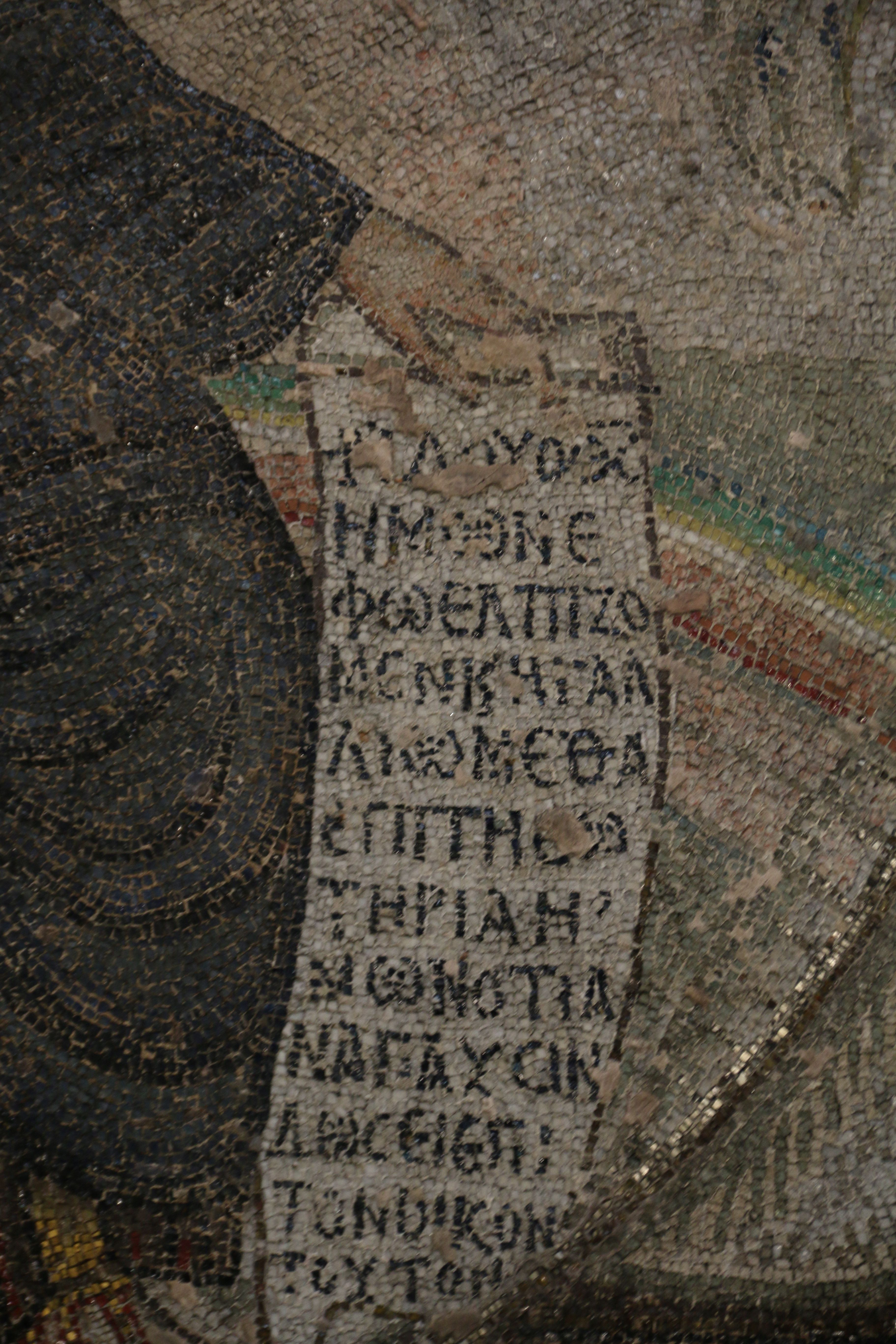
Detail of the scroll in Christ's hand.

The two figures in the icon lack the identifying labels that were common in Byzantine art. This has led to multiple proposed ideas as to who the figures represent. André Grabar argued that the figures were Saints Peter and Paul, and that the scene represents the Traditio Legis.

Andreas Xyngopoulos interpreted the figures to be Old Testament prophets. This is the most widely held interpretation. In the Bible, the Prophet Ezekiel has a vision in which he sees God surrounded by light and sees the four creatures shown in the Icon of Latomos (Book of Ezekiel, chapter 1). The Prophet Habakkuk has a similar vision (Book of Habakkuk, chapter 3). This has led researchers to consider that the two figures are perhaps the prophets Ezekiel and Habakkuk. In this way, the icon is understood to be a depiction of the Old Testament Theophany (Theophany meaning the appearance of God).

Another interpretation is that the icon represents the Resurrection of Jesus. Through prophecies, Habakkuk foretold the resurrection. These resurrectional prophecies were made popular by Saint Gregory Nazianzus' Second Oration for Easter. This leads researchers who assume a natural origin for the icon to theorize that it was made because of the popularity that Saint Gregory brought to Habakkuk. The figure of Ezekiel also lends itself to this interpretation since he also has resurrectional prophecies.

The most generally agreed upon interpretation is that the icon depicts the apocalyptic scene of Christ's Second Coming. This is supported by the story of the monk Sennuphius who is said to have asked God through prayer to see this Second Coming. In turn, Sennuphius found the icon, which led Abbott Ignatius to interpret it as an apocalyptic scene.

=== Two approaches to God ===
The characters on the right and left of Christ in the icon contrast each other sharply. One is sitting down with a distant gaze, presumable thinking, while the other is standing with his hands raised. This could represent the two approaches to understanding God: with the mind and with the heart. The apparent amazement of the figure on the left could represent the experiential aspect of encountering God, while the calm and collected figure on the right could represent the rational, logical approach.

=== Hesychasm ===
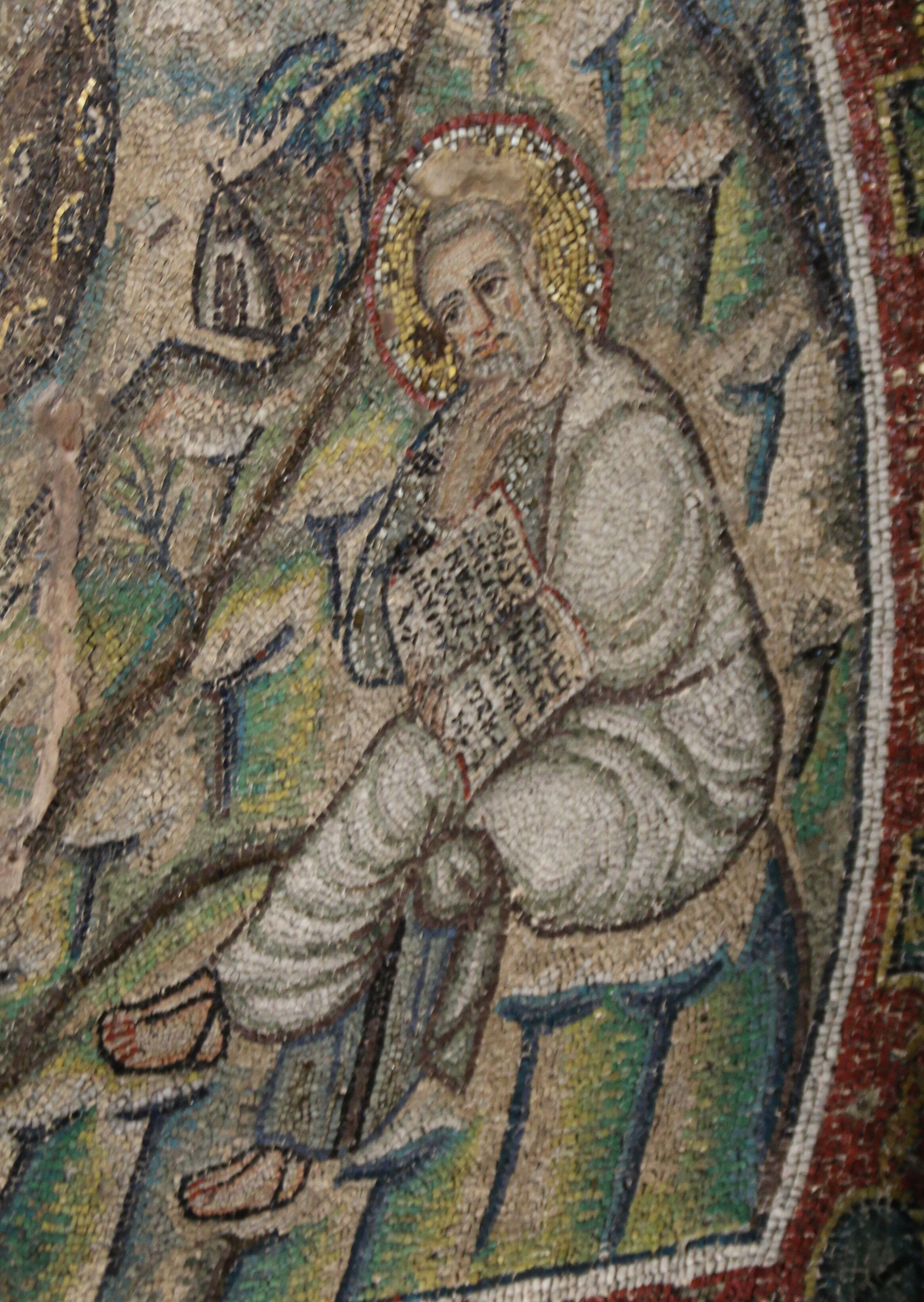
Detail of the figure on the right of Christ.

Another theological explanation of the icon comes from the presence of the light in the mosaic.

The Hosios David mosaic, with its radical translucent treatment of divine light, could perhaps be described as a Hesychast image before Hesychasm, so that the Latomos motif on the Poganovo icon would have been a highly appropriate choice for a donor steeped in Palamas' theology.

After the Text: Byzantine Enquiries in Honour of Margaret Mullett points out that this Hesychast imagery would have come from the theology of Saint Gregory Palamas (1296–1359). The theology of Hesychasm maintains that humans can, through extreme purification and constant prayer, come to see with their bodily eyes the Uncreated Light of God that appeared on Mount Tabor in Luke chapter 24. The Uncreated Light is present in the Icon of Christ of Latomos, especially since it is interpreted by André Grabar to be an image of the Ascension of Jesus, or at least an Old Testament type of it.

== Artistic influences ==
=== Backkovo icon ===
Ljubica Vinulović discusses in Migration in Visual Art how the composition of the Icon of Christ of Latomos migrated from Greece to Bulgaria. There is a similar icon from a later date which is housed in Bachkovo Monastery, a Bulgarian monastery founded by two brothers in 1083. On the upper floor of the ossuary is an icon not unlike the mosaic Icon of Christ of Latomos. It features a young Christ in the same aureole of light holding a scroll on which is written Isaiah 25:9 in Greek. "The scene had its model in the mosaic from Hosios David," said Vinulović.

=== Poganovo icon ===
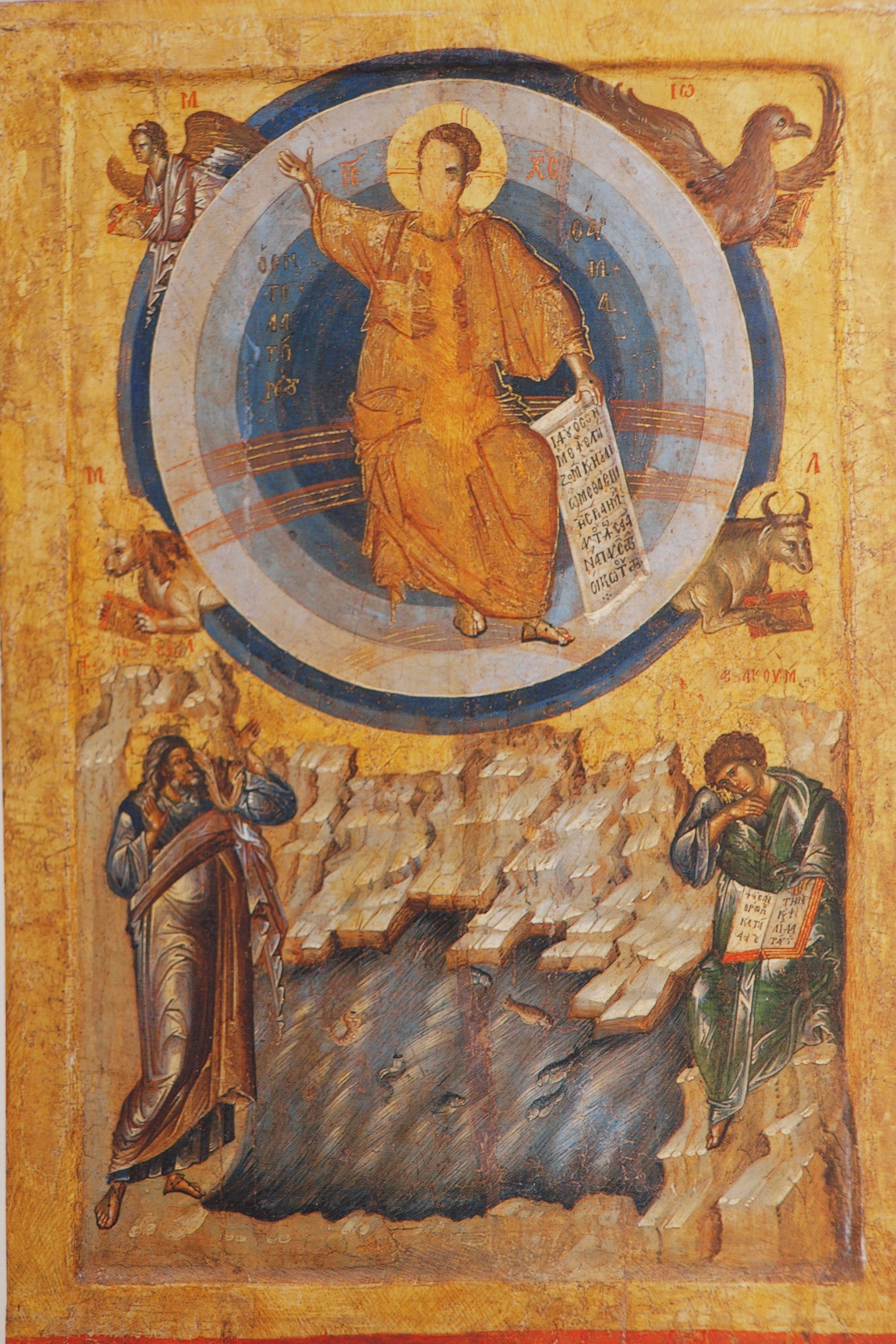
The Poganovo icon. The Prophet Habakkuk (right) is often represented as a young man in icons.

In the middle of the twentieth century, another famous icon of uncertain origin (called the Icon from Poganovo or the Poganovo Icon) was the subject of research and was transferred to the ossuary of the Cathedral Church of Saint Alexander Nevsky, in Sofia, Bulgaria before the outbreak of World War I. Before that, it had been kept in Poganovo, earning its name. This icon has been described as, "perhaps the most arresting and enigmatic" icon of the Palaeologan period.

The Poganovo icon, like the icon in Bachkovo Monastery, is compositionally similar to the older Latomos icon. Unlike the icon of Latomos, the Poganovo icon is not a mosaic, but painted on a wood panel with tempera paint. Furthermore, the Poganovo icon included the nail marks on Christ's hand, whereas on the Icon of Christ of Latomos there are no such markings. Identifying names are also ascribed to the two secondary figures in the Poganovo icon; Ezekiel and Habakkuk.

Many researchers theorized that the Poganovo icon originated in the fourteenth century, but the evidence was not conclusive. Because of the differences between the Poganovo icon and the Icon of Christ of Latomos, Andreas Xyngopoulos speculated that it might not have been based on the Latomos icon itself, but rather based on the miniature drawing of the icon in the Diegesis text. There remains a dispute about who commissioned the icon and for what occasion.

In the Poganovo icon, the figure of Christ holds a scroll with the same text as the scroll in the Icon of Christ of Latomos. In fact, the Poganovo icon itself has written on it the words, "Miracle of Jesus Christ of Latomos". On Habakkuk's book is written the verse Ezekiel 3:1, "Son of Man, eat this scroll." The evidence suggests that both the Poganovo icon and the icon at Bachkovo Monastery were copies of the original prototype, the Icon of Christ of Latomos.

== See also ==
- Acheiropoieta
- Icon
- Byzantine mosaics
- Panagia Ierosolymitissa
