= Nominal =

Nominal may refer to:

== Language ==
- Nominal (linguistics), a noun or adjective
- Nominal, related to nouns (as in "nominal agreement")
- Nominal number, a number used as a mere identifier
- Nominal sentence, a sentence without a finite verb
- Noun phrase, which takes the syntactic place of a noun

== Mathematics ==
- Nominal data, a form of categorical data in statistics
- Nominal number, a number used as a mere identifier

== Titles ==
- Post-nominal letters, letters indicating a title, placed after the name of a person
- Pre-nominal letters, letters indicating a title, placed before the name of a person

== Other uses ==
- Nominal aphasia or anomic aphasia, a problem remembering words and names
- Nominal category, a group of objects or ideas that can be collectively grouped on the basis of one or more shared, arbitrary characteristics
- Nominal damages, a small award to compensate for technical harm
- Nominal GDP, a raw gross domestic product value uncompensated for inflation or deflation
- Nominal techniques, computer science techniques for working with formal languages with name binding constructs
- Real versus nominal value, an accepted condition which is a goal or an approximation as opposed to the real value
  - Real versus nominal value (economics), the face value of currency not corrected for inflation or compound interest
- Nominal type system, a type system where properties of a data type are determined by explicit declaration and/or the name of a type
- De jure, describing practices officially recognized by laws or other formal norms, regardless of whether it was practiced in reality (de facto).

== See also ==
- Nominal group (disambiguation)
- Nominalism
- Nominalization
- Titular (disambiguation)
