= Titular =

Titular may refer to:

== Arts, entertainment, and media ==
- Title character in a narrative work, the character referred to in its title
- Title track, a song that has the same name as the album or film in which it appears
  - Title track, a promoted song on an album, akin to a single, regardless of the song's title
- Titular, a general term meaning relating or referring to the title [of something], or [something] having the same title as a larger set of some kind which it is contained within, and may be named after or vice versa

== Religion ==
- Titular (Catholicism), a cardinal who holds a titulus, one of the main churches of Rome
  - Titular bishop, a bishop who is not in charge of a diocese
  - Titular church, a church in Rome assigned or assignable to one of the cardinals
  - Titular see, an episcopal see of a former diocese that no longer functions

== Other uses ==
- Titular nation, the single dominant ethnic group in the state, typically after which the state was named
- Titular ruler, a person in an official position of leadership who possesses few, if any, actual powers

== See also ==
- Nominal (disambiguation)
- Title (disambiguation)
