= Titleholder =

Titleholder or Titleholders may refer to:

- Titleholder system
- Titleholder (horse)

== Golf ==
- Titleholders Championship, women's major golf championship played from 1937 to 1966 and again in 1972.
- Mercury Titleholders Championship, women's golf tournament played from 1990 to 1999
- CME Group Titleholders, season-ending tournament on the LPGA Tour played since 2011

== See also ==
- Title holder
- Title (disambiguation)
- Holder (disambiguation)
