= Titulus =

Titulus, the Latin word for "title", "label" or "inscription" (plural tituli, normally italicized), may or may not be italicized as a foreign word, and may refer to:

- Titulus, or Titular church, one of a group of Early Christian churches around the edges of Rome
- Titulus (inscription), a caption, title or other inscription, especially an Ancient Roman type, and a "caption" name in an artwork
- Titulus (fortification) a detached segment of rampart, covering the gateways of some early Imperial Roman military camps

== See also ==
- Titulus Crucis, a claimed relic of the INRI inscription on the cross of Jesus
- Titulus pictus, amphorae inscriptions
- Titulus Regius or Titulus Regis, literally the royal title, the name of a parliamentary decree giving Richard III the throne
