= David the Dendrite =

Saint of Thessaloniki

Saint David the Tree-Dweller
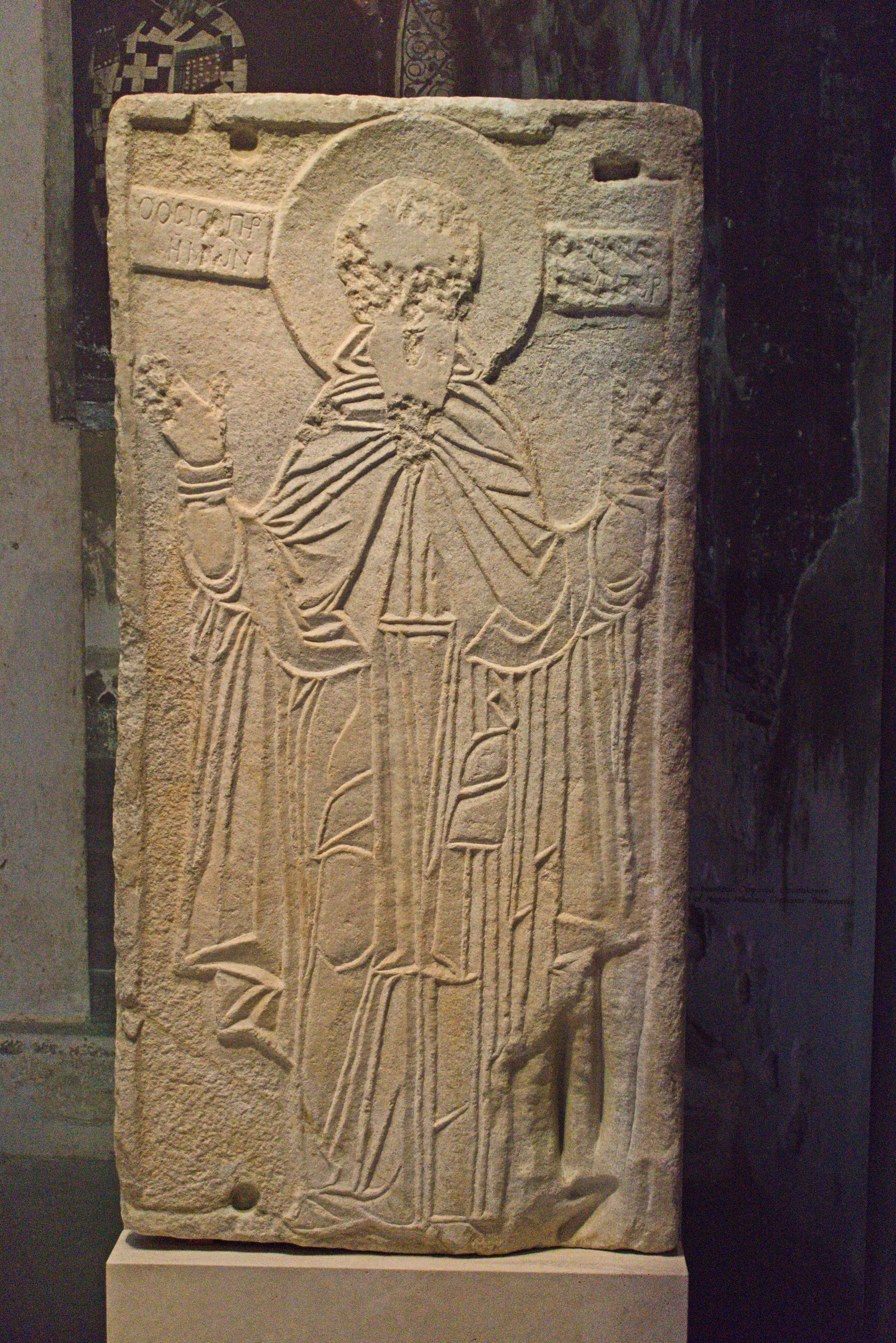
- Relief icon in Museum of Byzantine Culture, Thessaloniki (13th–14th centuries)

Dendrite
- Born: c. 450; Upper Mesopotamia
- Died: 540; Thermes
- Venerated in: Catholic Church; Eastern Orthodox Church
- Feast: 26 June (Roman Catholic & Eastern Orthodox Church); 16 September (Translation of Relics) (Greek Orthodox Church)
- Patronage: Thessaloniki

David the Dendrite (Greek: Δαυίδ ό Δενδριτής, c. 450–540), also known as David the tree-dweller and David of Thessalonika, is a saint of Thessaloniki. David became a monk at the Monastery of Saints Merkourios and Theodore outside Thessaloniki. Famed for his sound advice, he was hounded by crowds seeking words of wisdom and prayer. Wishing a quiet, contemplative life, David fled to the seclusion of an almond tree, where he lived for three years.

He left the tree to petition the Byzantine emperor Justinian the Great in Constantinople to send soldiers to defend Thessaloniki from attack. David died in 540 as his ship was en route to Macedonia.

David is commemorated on June 26 (by the Catholic Church and the Eastern Orthodox Church).

== See also ==
- Church of Hosios David
