= Title track =

A title track is a song that has the same name as the album or film in which it appears. In the Korean music industry, the term is used to describe a promoted song on an album, akin to a single, regardless of the song's title.

Title track may also refer to:

== Music ==
- "Title Track", a song by Death Cab for Cutie from their 2000 album We Have the Facts and We're Voting Yes
- "The Title Track", a song by The Fold from their 2006 album This Too Shall Pass (album)
- "Title Track", a song by Okkervil River from their 2007 album The Stage Names
- "Title Track", a song by Polvo from their 1995 EP This Eclipse
- "Title Track", a song by Amos the Transparent from their 2007 album Everything I've Forgotten to Forget
- "The Title Track", a song by Origami Angel from their 2019 album Somewhere City
- "Title Track", a song by Machine Gun Kelly from his 2020 album Tickets to My Downfall
- "Dhurandhar (Title Track)", a song from the 2025 Indian film Dhurandhar; a remake of "Na Dil De Pardesi Nu" by Charanjit Ahuja, Muhammad Sadiq and Ranjit Kaur
- "Title Track", a song by Phish from their experimental album The Siket Disc

== See also ==
- Title Tracks, the indie pop/rock solo project of Washington, D.C.–based musician John Davis
