= Nominal group =

Nominal group may refer to:

- Nominal group, alias for nominal category in statistics
- Nominal group (functional grammar)
- Nominal group technique, group decision-making technique
