= Church of Hosios David =

Church in Thessaloniki, Greece

- Όσιος Δαυίδ
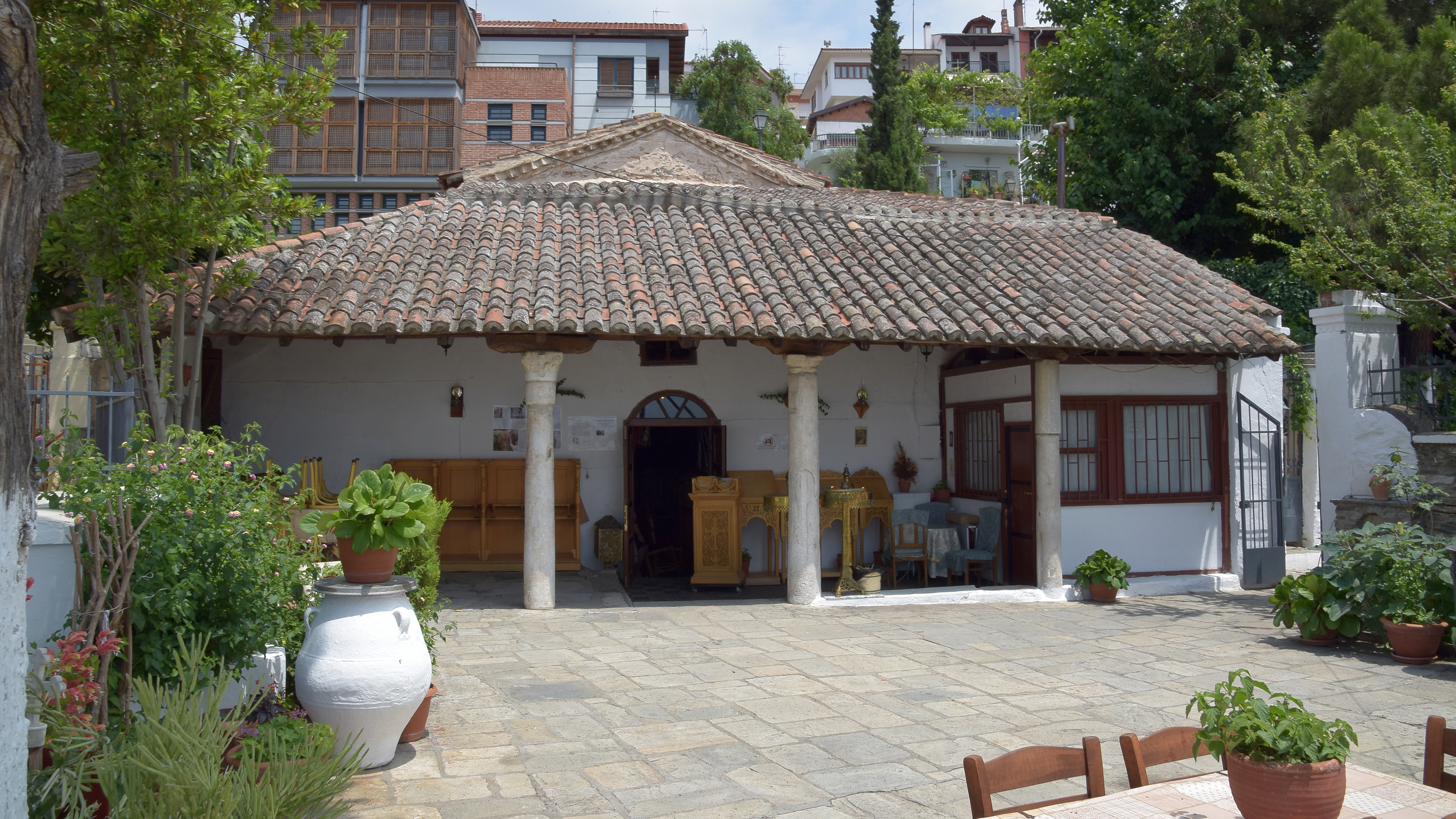
- Exterior of the church

- Location of the church in Greece
- Church of Hosios David
- 40°38′30″N 22°57′8″E
- Location: Thessaloniki, Central Macedonia
- Country: Greece
- Language: Greek
- Denomination: Greek Orthodox
- Previous denomination: Islam (c. 16th century–1921)

History
- Former names: Latomos Monastery (Greek: Μονή Λατόμου/Λατόμων); Suluca / Murad Mosque
- Status: Katholikon (5th–16th centuries); Mosque (c. 16th century–1921); Church (since 1921– )
- Dedication: David the Dendrite
- Dedicated: 1921
- Earlier dedication: Christ the Savior of Latomos

Architecture
- Functional status: Active
- Architectural type: Monastery
- Style: Byzantine
- Completed: 5th century

Administration
- Metropolis: Thessaloniki
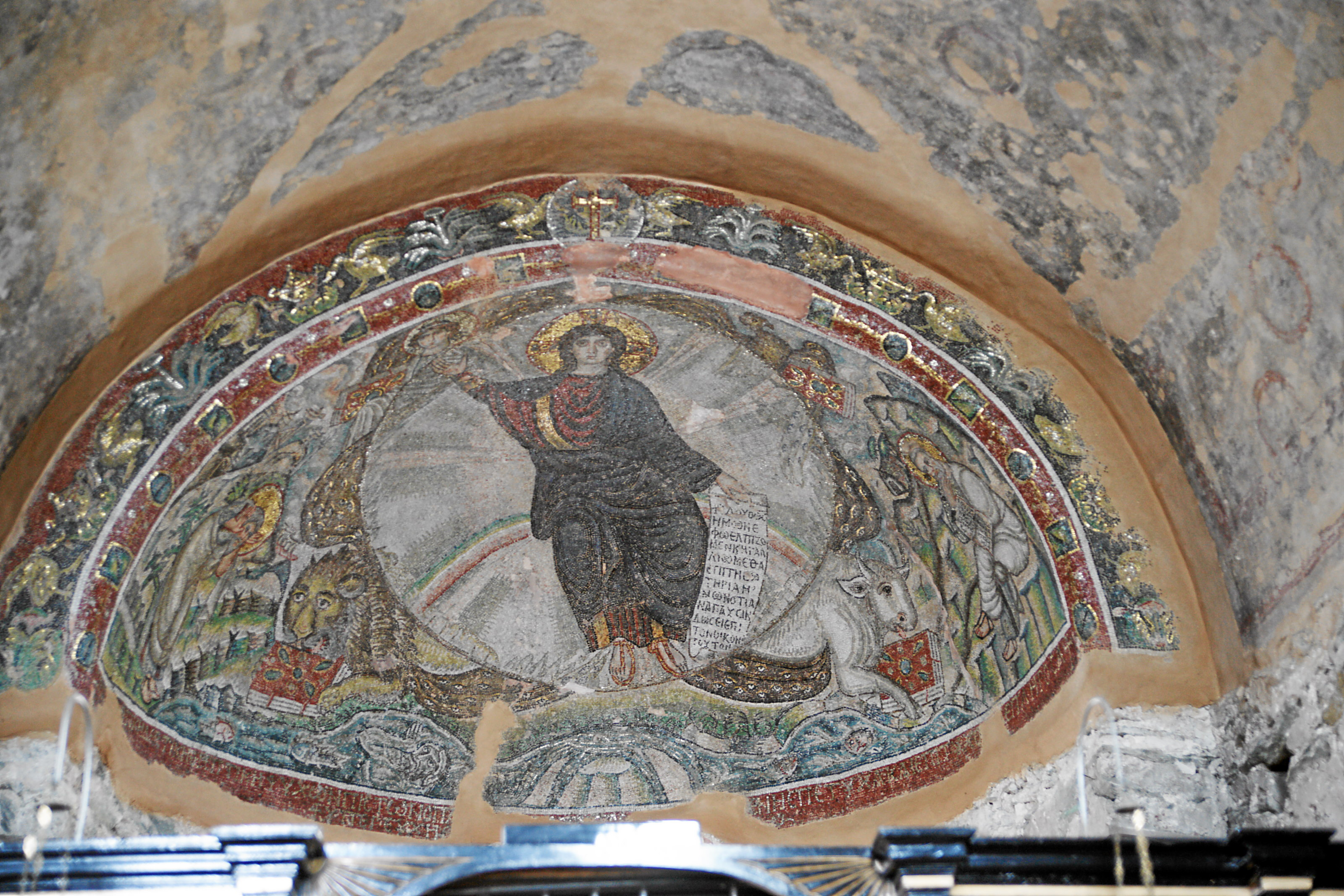
- Icon of Christ of Latomos, mosaic of Theophany

UNESCO World Heritage Site
- Part of: Paleochristian and Byzantine monuments of Thessaloniki
- Criteria: Cultural: (i), (ii), (iv)
- Reference: 456-005
- Inscription: 1988 (12th Session)
- Area: 0.058 ha (0.14 acres)

The Church of Hosios David (Greek: Όσιος Δαυίδ) is a late 5th-century church in Thessaloniki, in the Central Macedonia region of Greece. During Byzantine times, it functioned as the katholikon of the Latomos Monastery (Greek: Μονή Λατόμου/Λατόμων), and was adorned with rich mosaic and fresco decoration, which was renewed in the 12th–14th centuries. The church is dedicated to David the Dendrite. Many surviving elements of the Byzantine decoration are of high artistic quality, especially the 5th-century apse mosaic the Icon of Christ of Latomos.

During the Ottoman era, the church was converted into a mosque, most likely in the 16th century, until it was reconsecrated as a Greek Orthodox church in 1921, thus receiving its present name. In 1988, the church was one of fifteen structures inscribed on the UNESCO World Heritage List as the Paleochristian and Byzantine monuments of Thessaloniki.

== Architecture ==
The original building had a cross-in-square plan with squares as the main shape of the floor plan. This pattern would later become more popular. The structure contained square bays in the corners. The bays all connected to the main cross room via hallways. The bays also connected to the outside.

Sometime during the middle-Byzantine period the structure was damaged by earthquakes. Parts of the structure collapsed including the tribelon. The middle Byzantine period also saw the addition of marbling and a second round of fresco paintings.

== Decoration ==
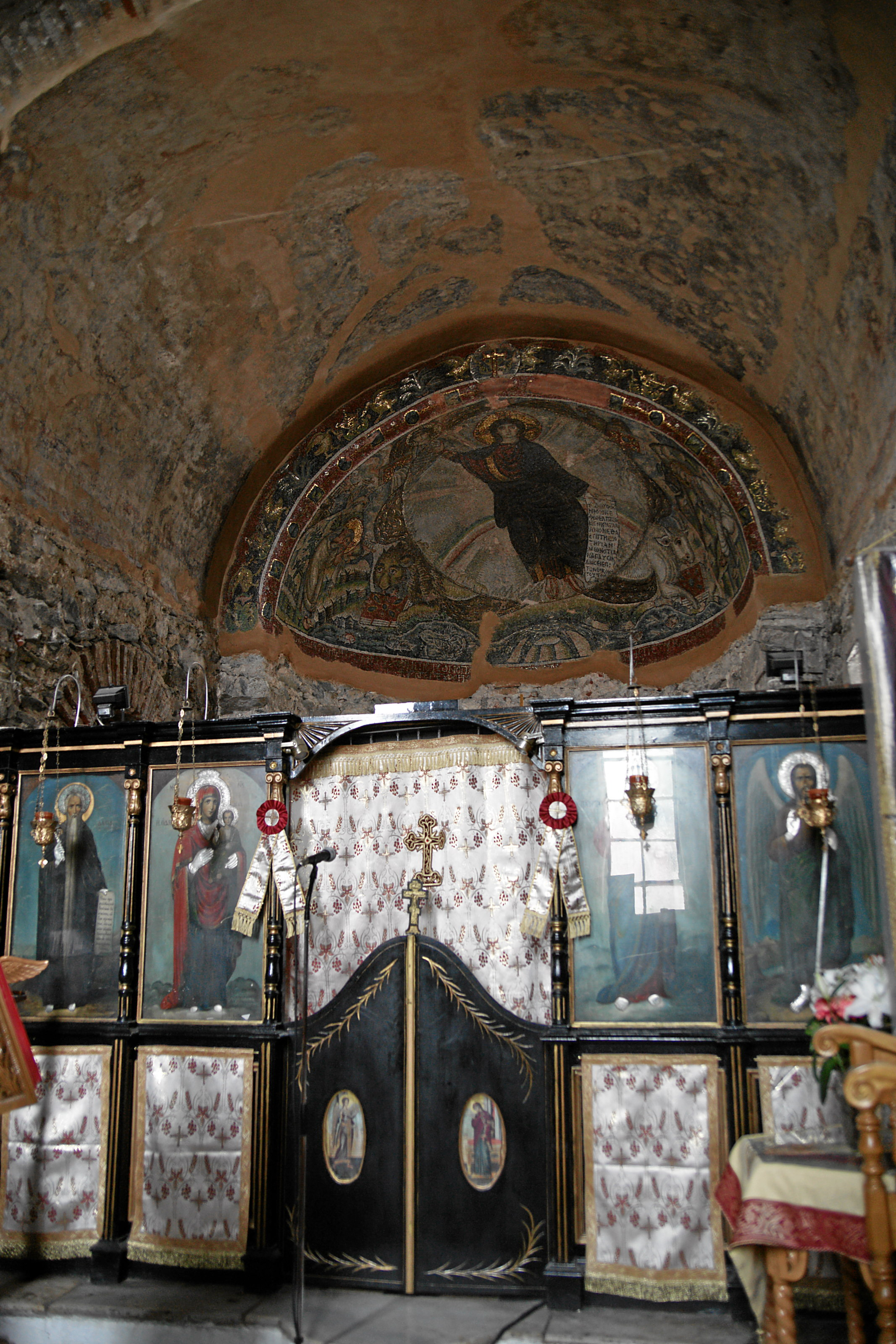
Interior

The marble decoration in the Church of Hosios David depicted crosses, vines and leaves in swirling detailing.

The mosaic Icon of Christ of Latomos of the Theophany is a detailed mosaic in a naturalistic style depicting Christ holding a text saying in Greek, “Behold our God, in whom we hope and we rejoice in our salvation, that he may grand rest to this home.” The mosaic contains symbolism indicating the Evangelists. The mosaic representing the Theophany is complex, with a detailed border, and a lot of elements within the scene. The focus of the image is Christ as shown by his gaze, his position in the center and the halos surrounding Christ’s head and body. This icon was said to have been miraculously created in the 3rd century.

Byzantine murals were discovered under the plaster at the Church of Hosios David. These murals are what is left of extensive fresco paintings from the middle Byzantine period, approximately 1160-70. The east part of the south and north barrel-vaults contains depictions of the nativity, the presentation in the temple, our lady of the passion, Christ on the mount of olives, entry into Jerusalem, theophany, and decorative panels meant to resemble marble slabs. The south barrel has the rest of the nativity and presentation in the temple. This area also depicts images of the baptism and transfiguration. The Church of Hosios David contains few borders between the different fresco scenes, which is an uncommon feature for this time.

Most of the frescos were created during the middle Byzantine period. The frescos: our lady of the passion, the entry into Jerusalem, and Christ on the Mount of Olives are likely later, during the Palaeologan period, approximately c. 1300. Many of the frescos today are damaged because of effects of time such as: earthquakes, cracking, water damage, and the plaster applied to cover them in the Turkish era.

== Conversion to a mosque ==
The Church of Hosios David has a simple exterior and is more removed from the heart of Thessaloniki, closer to the mountains. This contributed to the theory that the Church of Hosios David was not converted to a mosque immediately after the Turks conquered the area, as the Turks converted all the best churches, and best locations first. The mosque was called Suluca Mosque or Murad Mosque. When the Church of Hosios David was converted to a mosque the walls and by extension the art was covered with plaster. In addition a minaret was added at the south-west corner bay. Only the base remains today, together with the spiral staircase with in the remaining part of the minaret.

== See also ==
- Ancient Roman and Byzantine domes
- Islam in Greece
- List of Eastern Orthodox church buildings in Greece
- List of former mosques in Greece
- Ottoman Greece
