= Subtitle (disambiguation) =

Subtitles are text derived from film or television show dialogue that is usually displayed at the bottom of the screen.

Subtitle or Subtitles may also refer to:

- Subtitle (titling), an explanatory or alternate title of a book or other work
- Subtitle (rapper) (Giovanni Marks, born 1978), an American rapper and producer
- "Subtitle", a song by The Charlatans from the 1992 album Between 10th and 11th
- Subtitles Recordings, a record label run by Norwegian disc jockey Teebee

== See also ==
- Surtitles
