= Addressee =

Addressee may refer to:

- Someone to whom mail or similar things are addressed or sent
- Interlocutor (linguistics), a person to whom a conversation or dialogue is addressed

== See also ==
- Address (disambiguation)
- Addressee honorific, linguistic means to express the social status of the person being spoken to
- Clusivity, means of distinguishing who a pronoun addresses or refers to
