= Titulus (inscription) =

Label

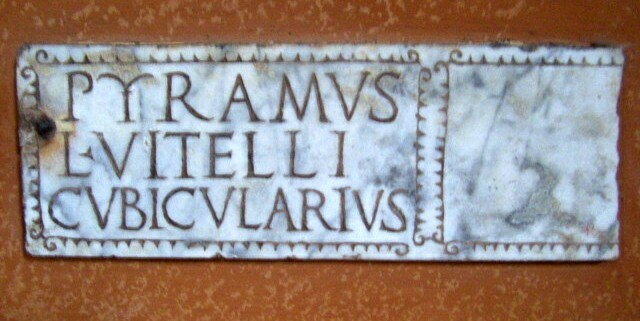
Titulus of Pyramus, the cubicularius of Lucius Vitellius the elder. Found in Rome, ref. CIL VI, 37786 = AE 1910, 00029

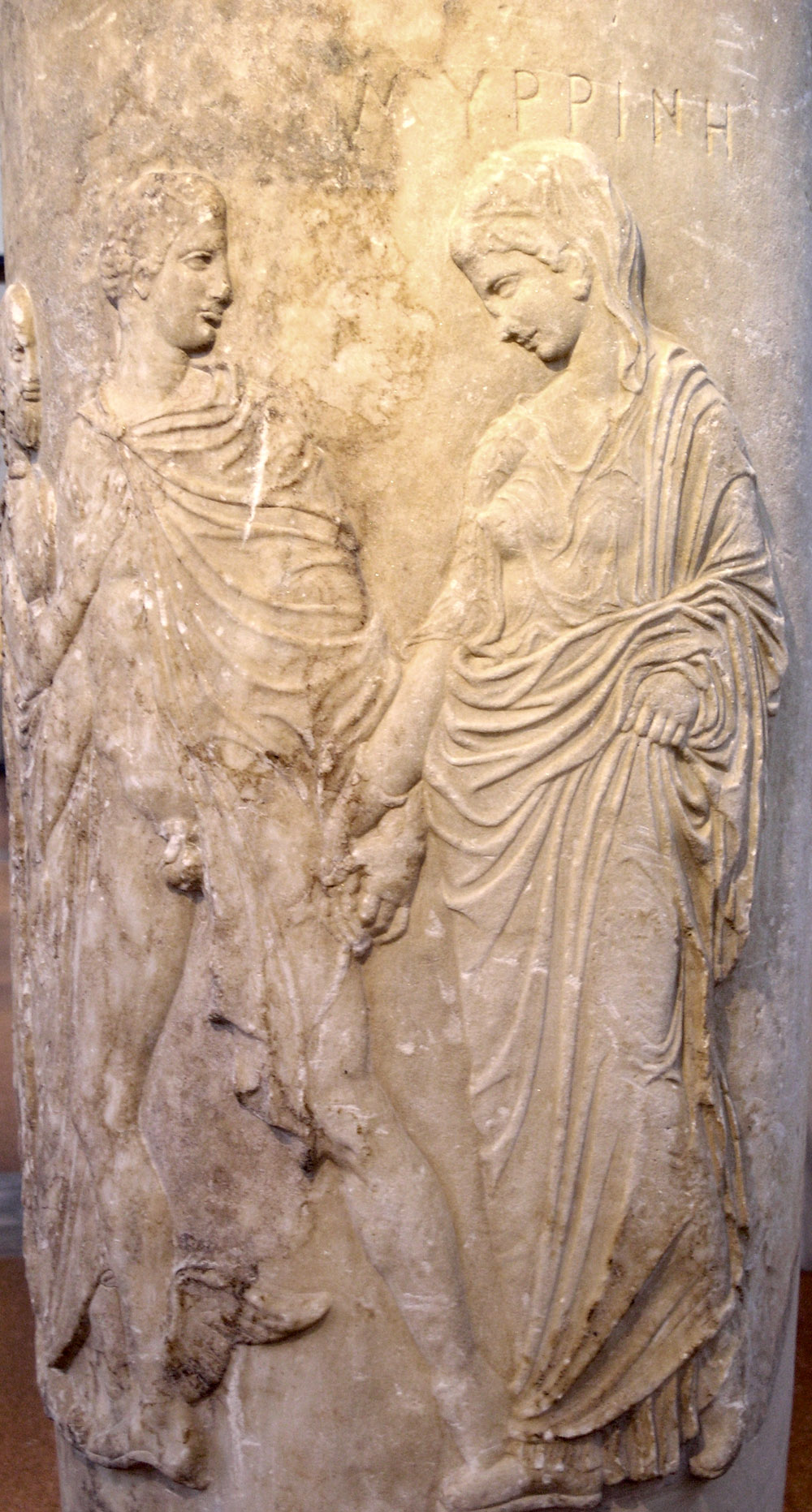
Relief from a carved funerary lekythos: Hermes conducts the deceased, Myrrhine, named in a titulus, to Hades, c. 430–420 BCE

See also Titulus (Roman Catholic) for Roman churches called tituli, or titulus (disambiguation) for more meanings.

Titulus (Latin "inscription" or "label", the plural tituli is also used in English) is a term used for the labels or captions naming figures or subjects in art, which were commonly added in classical and medieval art, and remain conventional in Eastern Orthodox icons. In particular, the term describes the conventional inscriptions on stone that listed the honours of an individual or that identified boundaries in the Roman Empire. A titulus pictus is a merchant's mark or other commercial inscription.

The sense of "title", as in "book title", in modern English derives from this artistic sense, just as the legal sense derives from plainer inscriptions of record.

== Use in Western art ==
The increasing reluctance of the art of the West to use tituli was perhaps because so few people could read them in the Early Medieval period, and later because they reduced the illusionism of the image. Instead a system of attributes, objects identifying popular saints, was developed, but many such figures in Western art are now unidentifiable. This reluctance affected the choice of scenes shown in art; only those miracles of Jesus that were easily identifiable visually tended to be shown in cycles of the Life of Christ. Thus, the Raising of Lazarus and Wedding at Cana are by far the most commonly shown miracles, and the healing miracles, visually easy to confuse, are neglected. The problems can clearly be seen in the small scenes of the Saint Augustine Gospels (late 6th century), where about 200 years after the manuscript was written tituli were added, which according to some art historians misidentify some scenes. Banderoles were a solution that became popular in the later Middle Ages, and in Northern Europe in the 15th century were sometimes used very extensively for speech, rather as in modern comics, as well as tituli. These were abandoned as old-fashioned in the Renaissance, but increased respect for classical traditions led to continued use of Ancient Roman-style tituli where they were considered necessary, including on portraits.

== Examples of tituli ==
- In the context of the Crucifixion of Jesus, the titulus "IESVS NAZARENVS REX IVDAEORVM" (and its translations in Aramaic and Greek) is believed to have been affixed to Jesus' cross. INRI is the abbreviation for the above-mentioned Latin translation. See INRI and Titulus Crucis.
- At the recovery of the coffin of King Arthur at Glastonbury Abbey, at an opportune moment after a devastating fire in the 12th century, a lead cross of Arthur was alleged to have borne the explicit titulus "HIC JACET SEPULTUS INCLITUS REX ARTHURUS IN INSULA AVALONIA". The well-publicized discovery described by Giraldus Cambrensis, redoubled the pilgrimages to the Abbey.

== Gallery ==
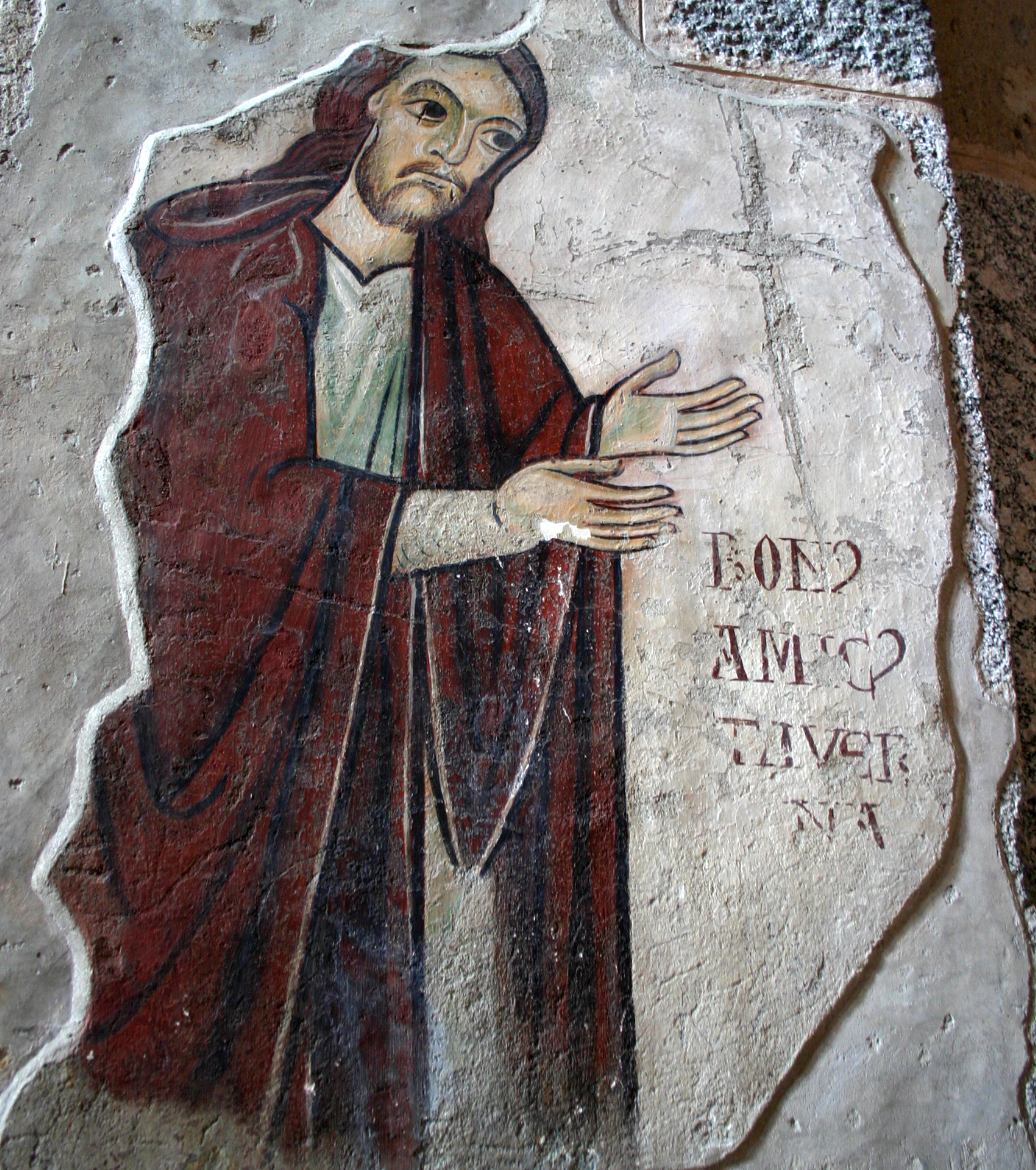
14th-century Italian titulus records the identity of Bonamico Taverna, known only from this donor portrait

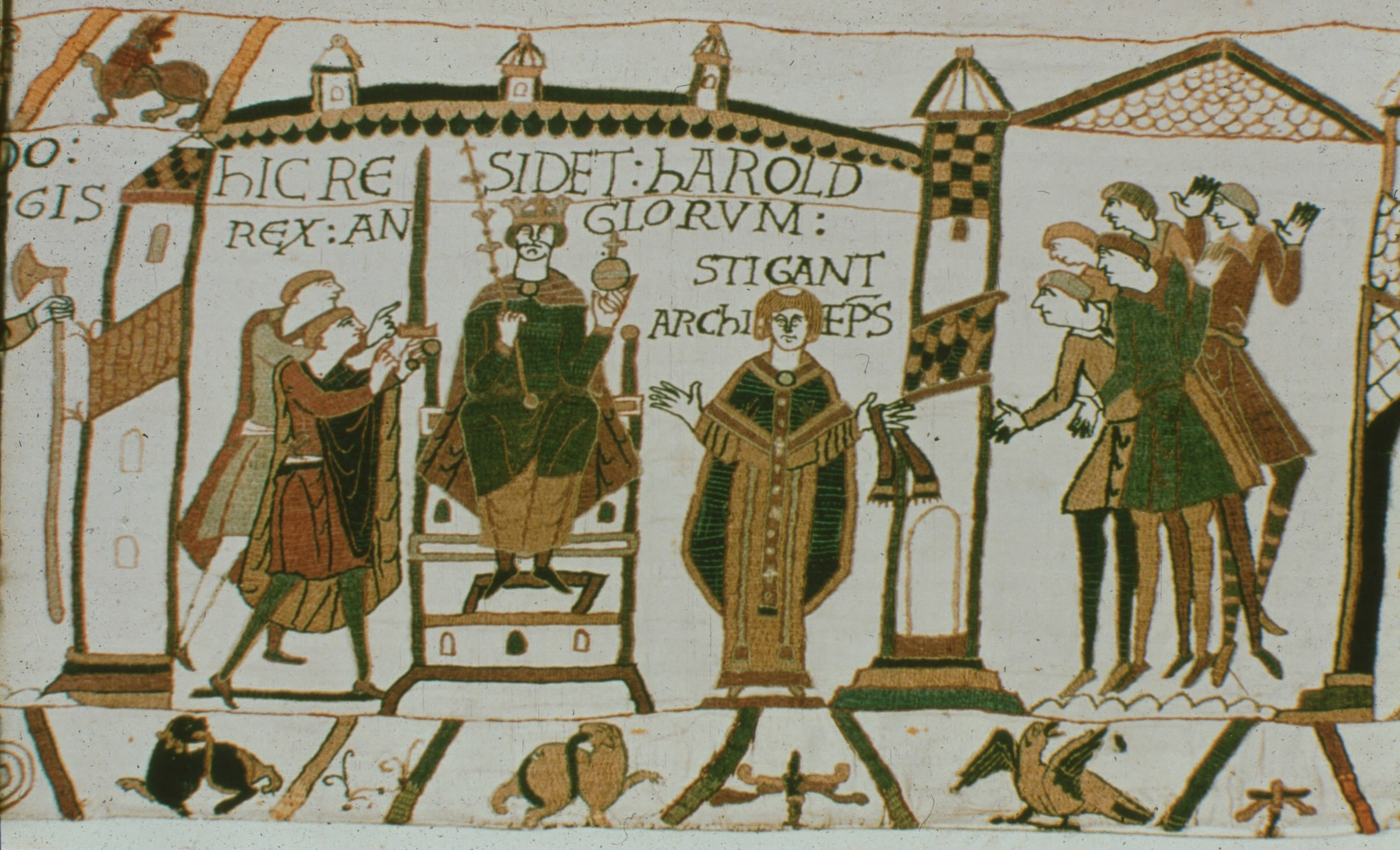
The 11th-century Bayeux Tapestry makes extensive use of tituli to explain the complicated story: "HIC RESIDET HAROLD REX ANGLORUM" and "STIGANT ARCHIEPS".

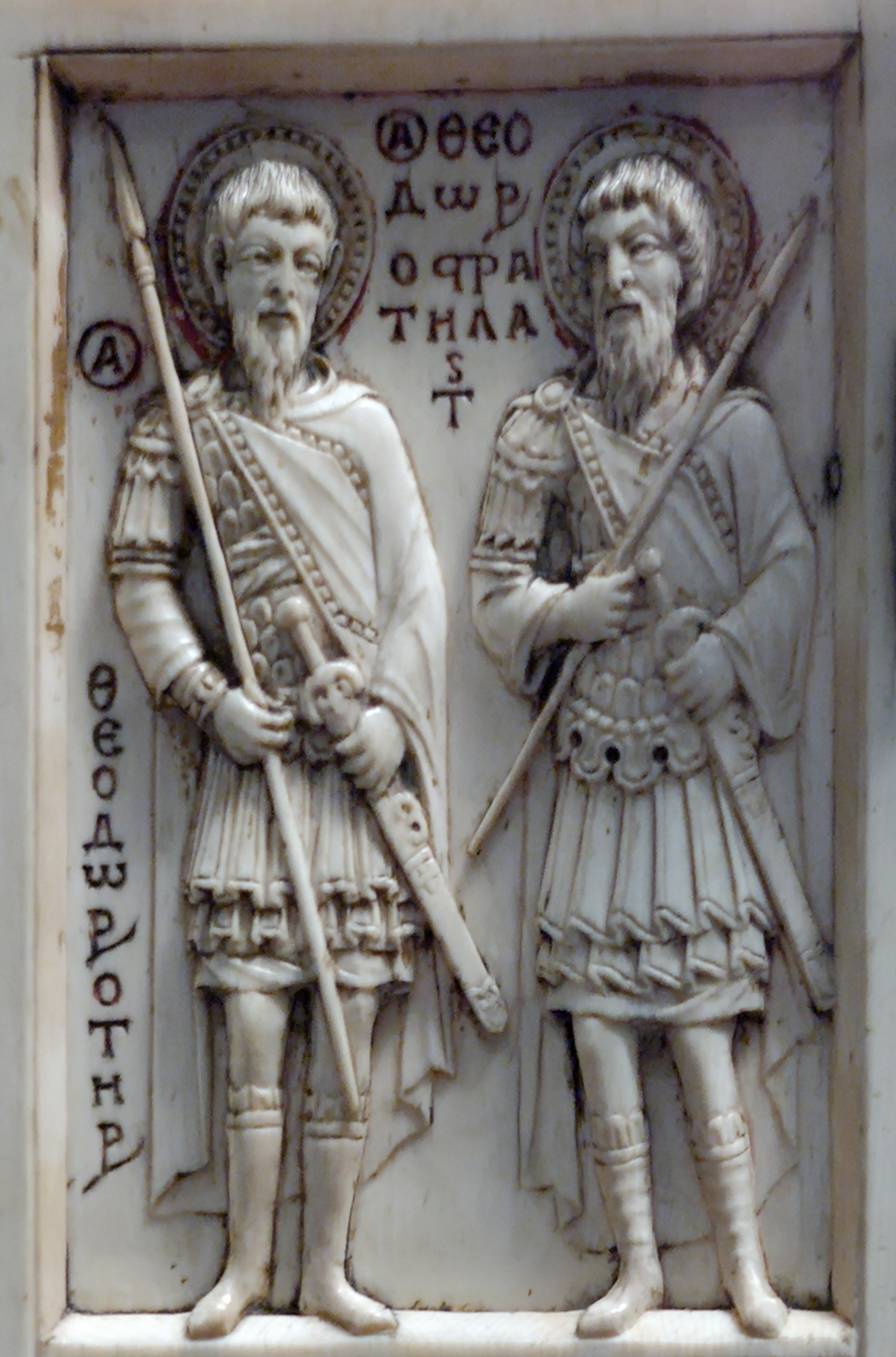
Two "Saint Theodore"s are distinguished by tituli in the Byzantine Harbaville Triptych

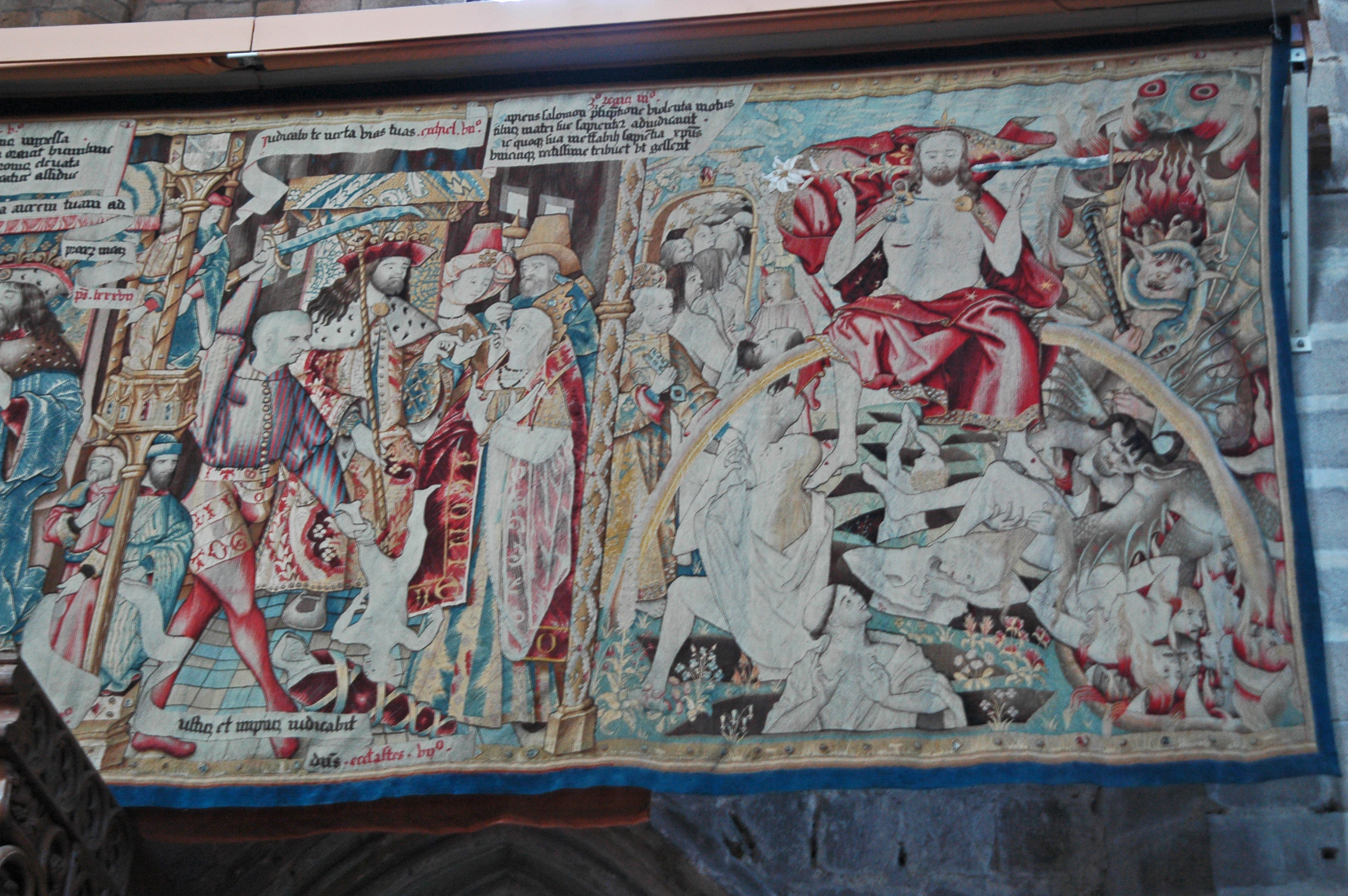
Extensive tituli, and "speech-bubbles" on banderoles in this early 16th-century tapestry
