= Address (disambiguation) =

An address is a collection of information used to give the location of a building or a plot of land.

Address or The Address may also refer to:

- Address (film), an upcoming Indian film by Rajamohan
- Melvilasom or The Address, a 2011 Indian film
- The Address (film), a 2014 film by Ken Burns

== Buildings ==
- Address Boulevard, a hotel in Dubai
- Address Downtown, a hotel in Dubai

== Computing ==
- <address></address>, an HTML element
- An (often virtual) location in an address space which corresponds to a logical or physical entity
- Email address

== Other uses ==
- Public speaking, the process of speaking to a group of people in a structured, deliberate manner
- Style (form of address), a legal, official, or recognized title

== See also ==
- Addressee (disambiguation)
- Term of address (disambiguation)
