= Mosaic Fragment with Man Leading a Giraffe =

5th century Byzantine mosaic

Mosaic Fragment with Man Leading a Giraffe, Byzantine, northern Syria or Lebanon
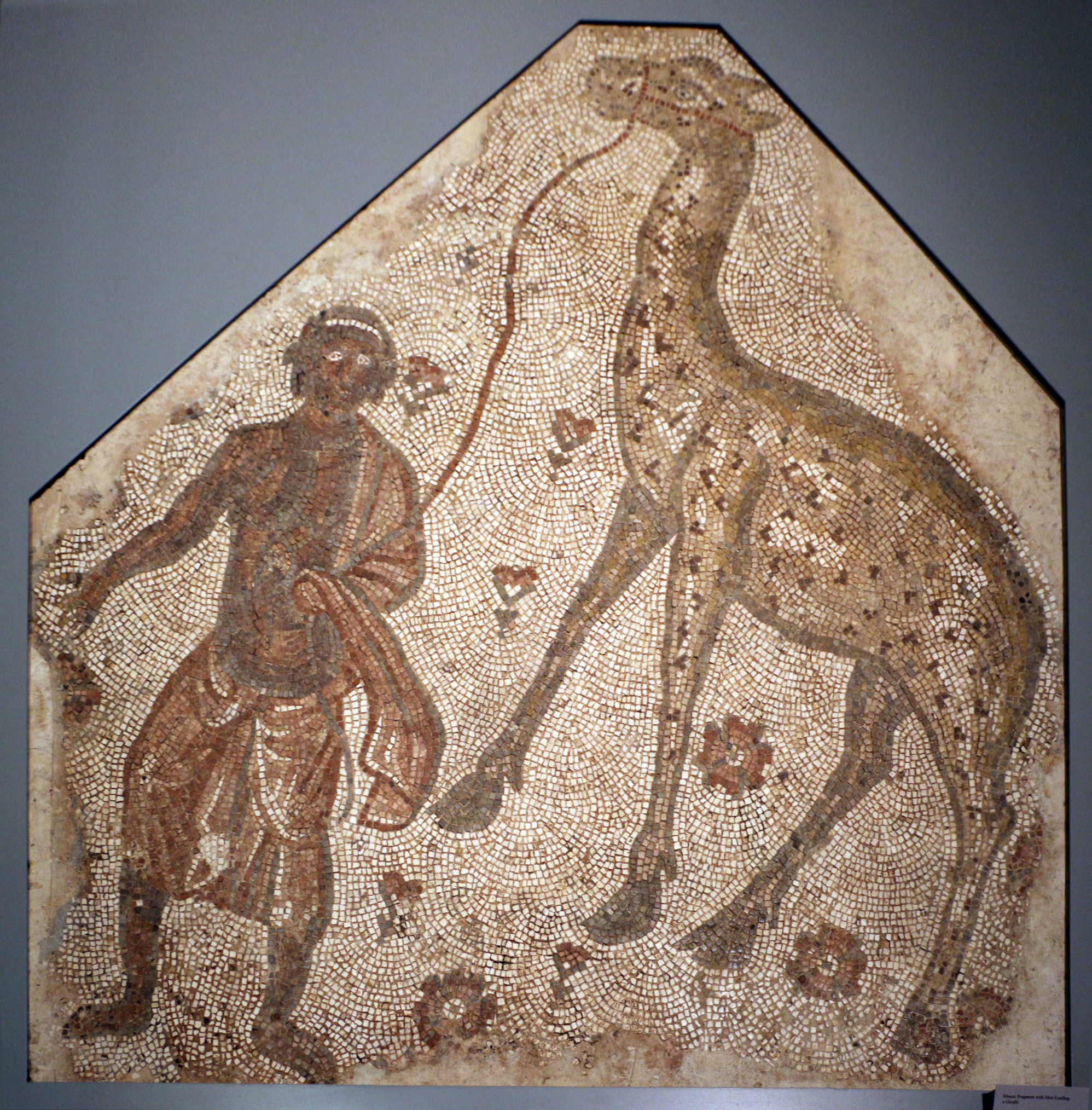
- Year: 5th century A.D.
- Dimensions: 170.8 x 167 x 6.35 cm (67 1/4 x 65 3/4 x 2 1/2 in.)
- Location: Art Institute of Chicago, Chicago
- Accession: 1993.345

The Mosaic Fragment with Man Leading a Giraffe is a mosaic from the 5th century CE, now held in the Art Institute of Chicago. The piece is Byzantine and originated in northern Syria or Lebanon. Mosaics of this type were commonly used to decorate wealthy family villas.

== Background ==
The fragment originated in either Syria or Lebanon. It was part of a much larger composition which covered the floor of a wealthy family villa. A related object from the same donor and region also specifies that the room within which the floor was located was likely semipublic, such as a reception or dining room. The text suggests that this image was once among several other examples of exotic animals, which giraffes were considered to be at that time since they were non-native to the Mediterranean region and were often only seen while being paraded around at public events. Giraffes were collected by Romans beginning with the first one being brought to Rome by Julius Caesar in 46 CE. Since the region in which this object originated had experienced Roman control prior to the making of the piece, this is a likely influence and possible reason for this particular image's creation.

== Provenance ==
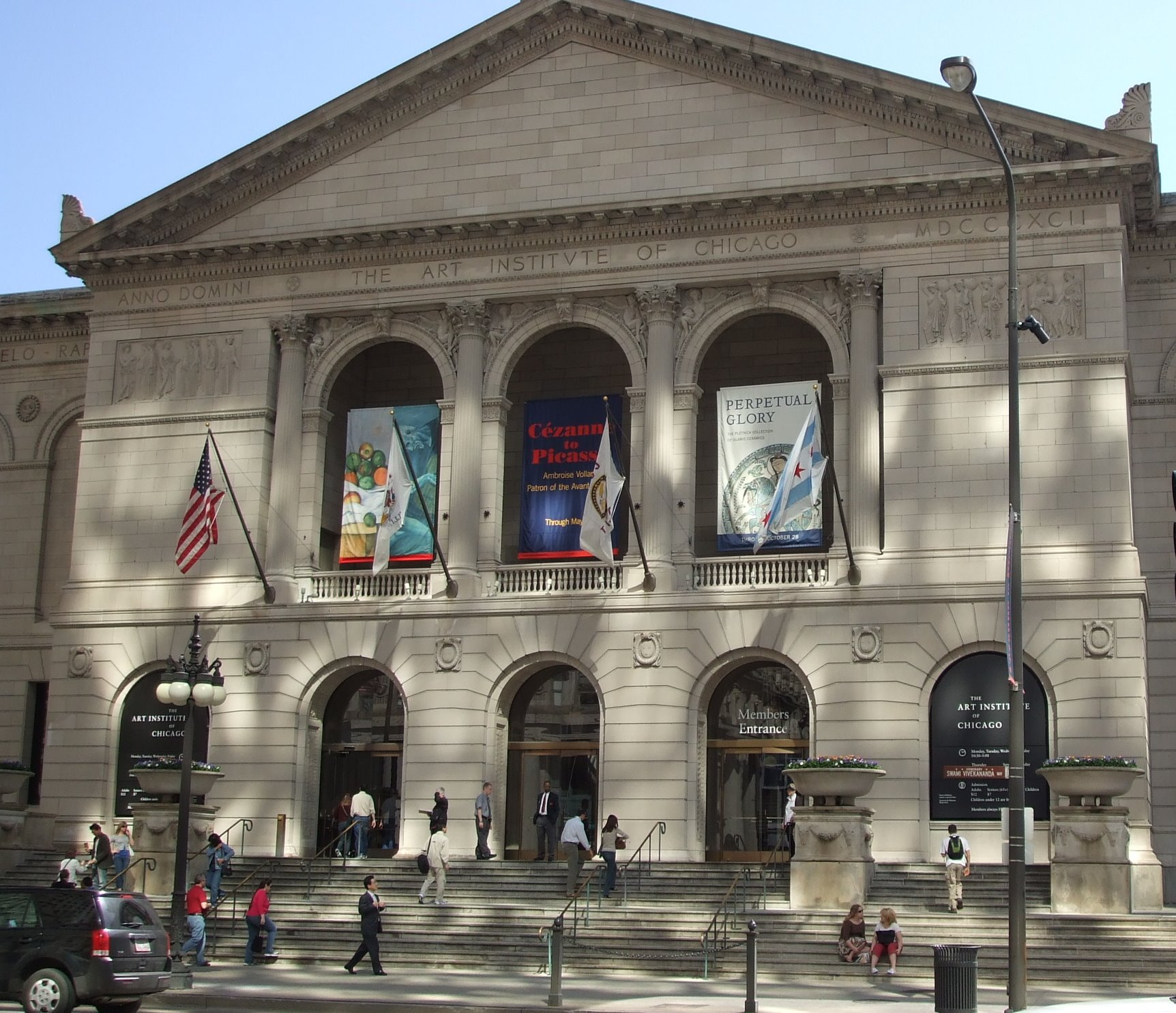
The Art Institute of Chicago

The fragment is located in Gallery 153, the Ancient and Byzantine Gallery, at the Institute. It is still in some ways used in its original intended way, aesthetic representation, but it has lost its function as a structural element. The piece is near the back corner of its gallery with like objects. Gallery 153 is arranged chronologically and so this work “belongs” in this location according to its place in time, and has an interactive iPad beside its display case to entice visitors to stop.

The work was a gift in 1993 from a Mrs. Robert B. Mayer. In 1989, just a few years before the accession of this particular piece, the donations of the Mayer family were discussed in an article in the Los Angeles Times. Robert B. Mayer was a founding member of the Chicago Museum of Contemporary Art and a member of the purchasing committee for the Art Institute. He and his wife Beatrice “Buddy” Mayer travelled the world, collecting art. Mrs. Mayer worked with children in Israel, and this particular mosaic fragment may have come into the Mayers’ possession because they had fallen in love with mosaics from the Middle Eastern region. Mr. Mayer died in 1974 and his collection of about 2,000 items was left to his wife . She established a program which actively loaned items from her private collection to colleges and museums, and she later sold several of the contemporary art pieces for millions of dollars.

== See also ==
- Inn of the Good Samaritan with museum of mosaics from the West Bank and Gaza
- Lod Mosaic Archaeological Center with Roman-period mosaic
- Basilica of San Vitale, Ravenna
