= Camuliana =

Ancient town or village in ancient Cappadocia

Coordinates: 38°54′15″N 35°14′39″E

Camuliana, Camulia, Kamoulianai, or Kamoulia (Greek: Καμουλιαναί, Καμούλιανα) was an ancient town or perhaps a village in ancient Cappadocia, located northwest of Caesarea, today Kayseri in Turkey. It is mostly mentioned in connection with the Image of Camuliana, an acheiropoieton or "icon not made by hands" of the face of Christ, which was one of the earliest of this class of miraculously created icons to be recorded; this is also sometimes referred to simply as the "Camouliana". During Byzantine times, the town was also called Iustinianoupolis Nova.

Its site is tentatively located near Emmiler, Asiatic Turkey. It lay on the old Byzantine road from Kaisareia to Tabia, near the point where it crossed the Halys river by the Çokgöz Köprüsü bridge. The name of the place is of Celtic origin.

Camuliana was made into a polis under Justinian with the name Iustinianopolis, but after the acheiropoieton was transferred to Constantinople in 574, the city lost much of its significance and the name "Iustinianopolis" fell out of use. It is probably identical with the tourma of Kymbalaios in the later Byzantine theme of Charsianon. From 971-5 Kymbalaios was the seat of a strategos whose task was probably to secure the road near the Çokgöz Köprüsü.

== Bishopric ==
The episcopal see of Camuliana is of relatively late origin, since it did not yet exist in the time of Basil the Great 329–379. However, five of its bishops are named in the acts of various councils: a Basilius at the Second Council of Constantinople (553); a Georgios at the Third Council of Constantinople (680); a Theodoros at the Quinisext Council (692); another Georgios at the Second Council of Nicaea (787); and a Gregorios at the Photian Council of Constantinople (879). A seal indicates that there was also a bishop named Michael in the 10th or 11th century.

No longer a residential bishopric, Camuliana is today listed by the Catholic Church as a titular see.

== Image of Camuliana ==
The image of Christ that appears in Camuliana is mentioned in the early 6th century by Zacharias Rhetor, his account surviving in a fragmentary Syriac version, and is probably the earliest image to be said to be a miraculous imprint on cloth in the style of the Veil of Veronica (a much later legend) or Shroud of Turin. In the version recorded in Zacharias's chronicle, a pagan lady called Hypatia was undergoing Christian instruction, and asking her instructor "How can I worship him, when He is not visible, and I cannot see Him?" She later found in her garden a painted image of Christ floating on water. When placed inside her head-dress for safekeeping it then created a second image onto the cloth, and then a third was painted. Hypatia duly converted and founded a church for the version of the image that remained in Camuliana.

In the reign of Justinian I (527-565) the image is said to have been processed around cities in the region to protect them from barbarian attacks. This account differs from others but would be the earliest if it has not suffered from iconodule additions, as may be the case.

One of the images (if there was more than one) probably arrived in Constantinople in 574, and is assumed to be the image of Christ used as a palladium in subsequent decades, being paraded before the troops before battles by Philippikos, Priscus and Heraclius, and in the Avar Siege of Constantinople in 626, and praised as the cause of victory in poetry by George Pisida, again very early mentions of this use of icons.

It was probably destroyed during the Byzantine Iconoclasm, after which mentions of an existing image cease (however Heinrich Pfeiffer identifies it with the Veil of Veronica and Manoppello Image), and in later centuries its place was taken by the Image of Edessa, which apparently arrived in Constantinople in 944, and icons of the Theotokos such as the Hodegetria. The Image of Edessa was very probably later, but had what apparently seemed to the Byzantines an even more impressive provenance, as it was thought to have been an authentic non-miraculous portrait painted from life during the lifetime of Jesus.
