= Santa Maria Arabona =

Abbey in Manoppello, Italy

Cistercian Abbey of Santa Maria Arabona
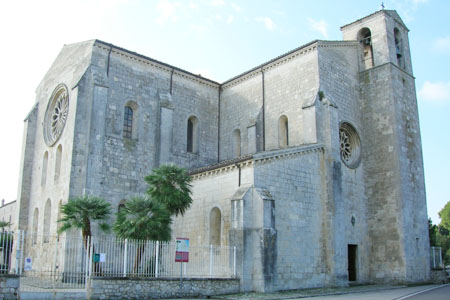
- Abbey church of Santa Maria Arabona

- Location within Italy
- Interactive map of Cistercian Abbey of Santa Maria Arabona

Monastery information
- Order: Cistercian
- Established: 1209
- Disestablished: 1587
- Mother house: Tre Fontane Abbey
- Diocese: Chieti-Vasto

Site
- Location: Manoppello, Italy
- Coordinates: 42.302298°N 14.062206°E
- Public access: yes

Santa Maria Arabona is a Cistercian abbey in Abruzzo, in central Italy. It is located at Manoppello in the frazione also called Santa Maria Arabona. In Roman times the area was sacred to the goddess of fertility and virginity Bona Dea.

== Architecture ==
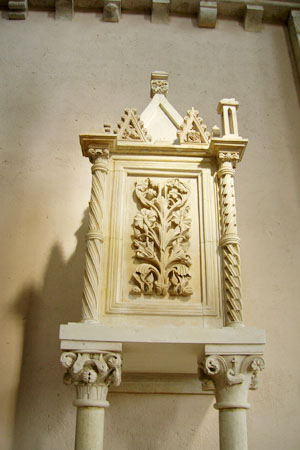
The Gothic tabernacle

The most important of the abbey buildings still extant is its church, dedicated to the Virgin Mary, whose construction began in 1208 with the transept and the apse. The edifice remained partly unfinished, due to financial and political troubles within the order.

The church is built on the Latin Cross plan, with the nave ending in an apse housing the high altar. The aisles support the ceiling. The interior is very sober, apart from the richly decorated tabernacle and Paschal candle in Gothic style. The choir contains frescoes by Antonio Martini di Atri dated 1377.

The church, which was restored in the 1950s, is surrounded by a park from which the rest of the abbey is accessed.

== See also ==
- List of Cistercian monasteries

== Bibliography ==
- Mammarella, Luigi (1995). "Santa Maria d'Arabona di Manoppello". Abbazie e monasteri cistercensi in Abruzzo (in Italian). Cerchio (AQ): Adelmo Polla Editore. p. 57-90. ISBN 8874070276.
