= Veil of Veronica =

Sweat cloth relic of Saint Veronica

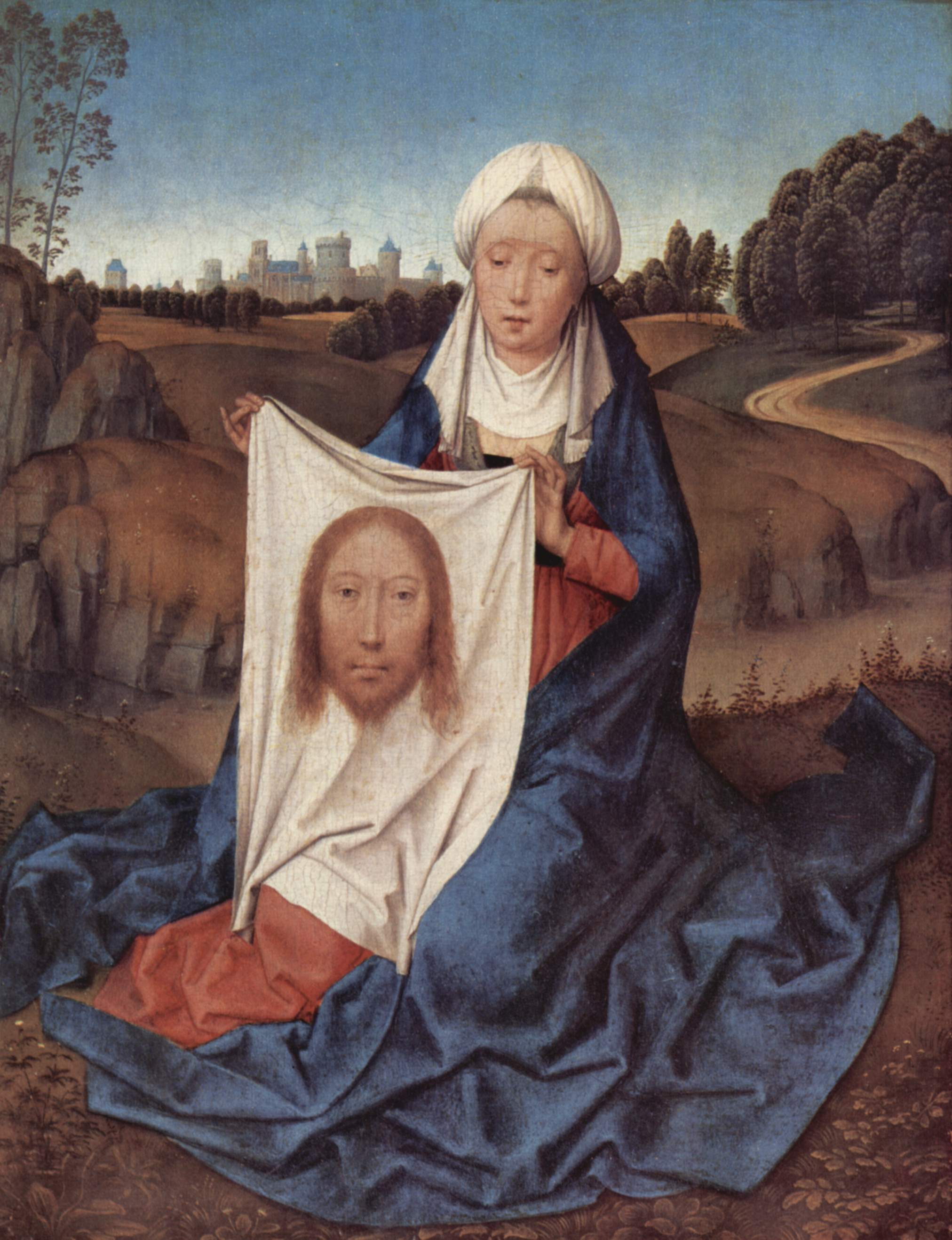
Veronica holding her veil, Hans Memling, c. 1470

The Veil of Veronica, or Sudarium (Latin for sweat-cloth), also known as the Vernicle, the Veronica and the Holy Face, is a Christian relic consisting of a piece of cloth said to bear an image of the Holy Face of Jesus produced by miraculous means (an acheiropoieton). Various existing images have been claimed to be the original relic or an early copy of it; representations of it are also known as vernicles.

The story of the image's origin is related to the sixth Station of the Cross, wherein Saint Veronica, encountering Jesus along the Via Dolorosa to Calvary, wipes the blood and sweat from his face with her veil. According to some versions, St. Veronica later traveled to Rome to present the cloth to the Roman Emperor Tiberius. The veil has been said to quench thirst, cure blindness, and even raise the dead.

The first written account of the story is from the Middle Ages, and during the 14th century, the veil became a central icon in the Western Christian Church. In the words of art historian Neil Macgregor, "From [the 14th Century] on, wherever the Roman Church went, the Veronica would go with it." The act of Saint Veronica wiping the face of Jesus with her veil is celebrated in the sixth Station of the Cross in many Catholic, Evangelical-Lutheran and Anglican churches.

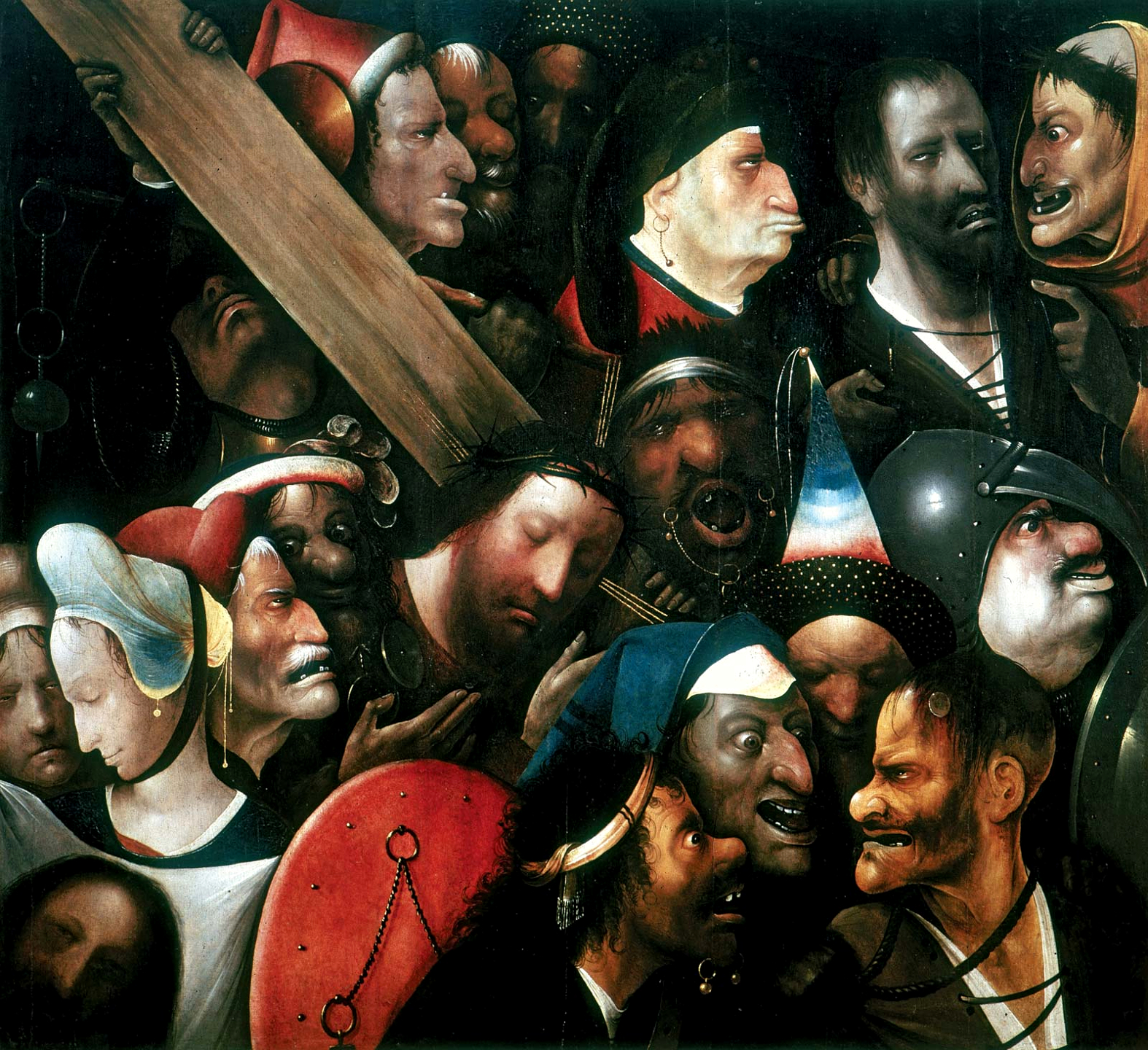
Christ carrying the cross, attributed to Hieronymus Bosch, c. 1510; in the lower-left corner: Veronica with the veil

== Evolution of the story ==
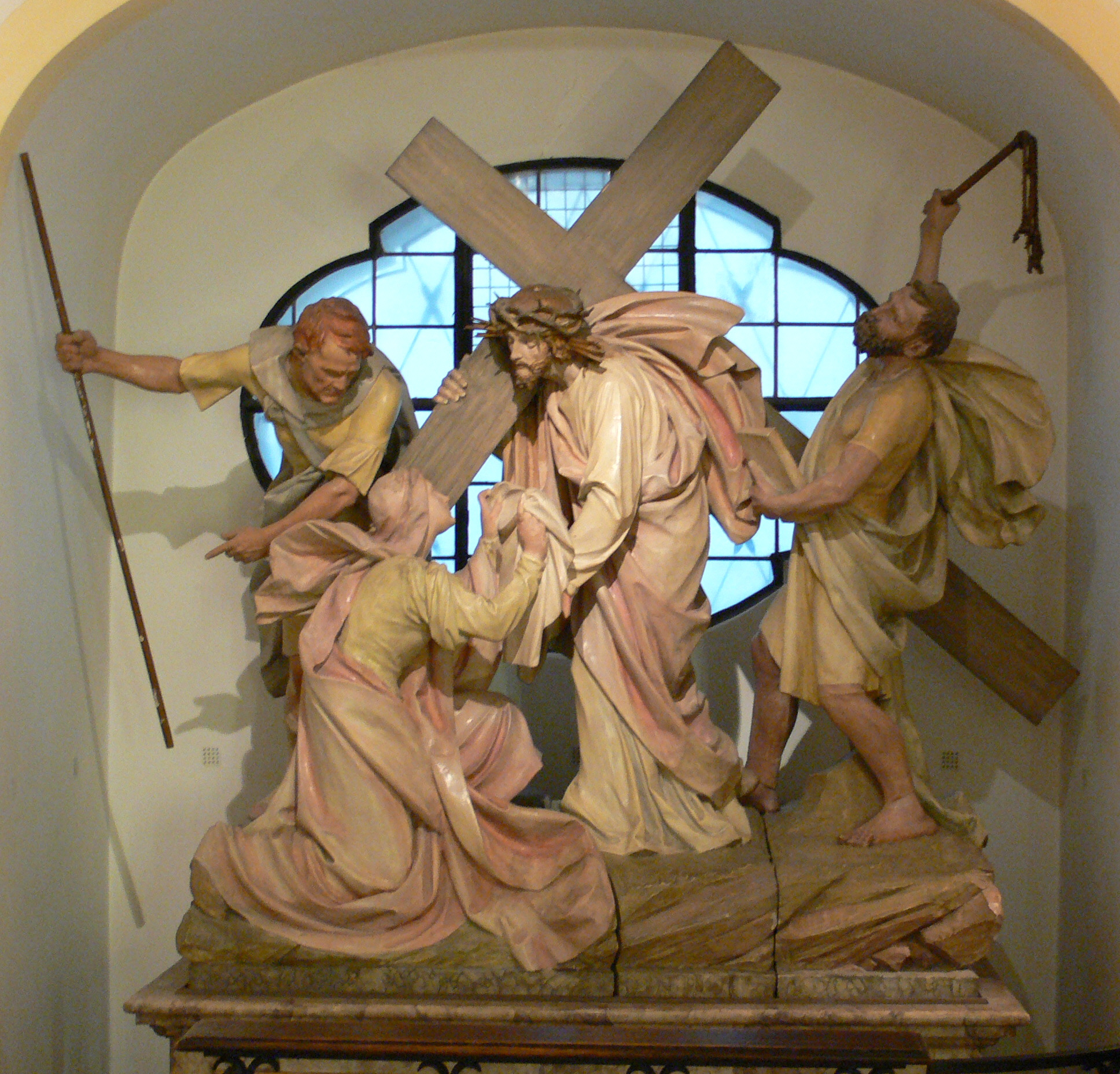
19th-century group of Saint Veronica offering Jesus the veil, from a series of Stations of the Cross.

There is no reference to the story of Veronica and her veil in the canonical Gospels. The closest written reference is the miracle of Jesus healing the bleeding woman by touching the hem of Jesus' garment; her name is later identified as Veronica by the apocryphal "Acts of Pilate". The story was later elaborated in the 11th century by adding that Christ gave her a portrait of himself on a cloth, with which she later cured Tiberius. The linking of this with the bearing of the cross in the Passion, and the miraculous appearance of the image, was made by Roger d'Argenteuil's Bible in French in the 13th century, and gained further popularity following the internationally popular work Meditations on the Life of Christ of about 1300. It is also at this point that other depictions of the image change to include a crown of thorns, blood, and the expression of a man in pain, and the image became very common throughout Catholic Europe, forming part of the Arma Christi, and with the meeting of Jesus and Veronica becoming one of the Stations of the Cross.

== Origin of the name ==
According to the Catholic Encyclopedia, the name Veronica is a colloquial portmanteau of Latin vera 'truth' and Greek eikon 'image'. The encyclopedia suggests that a description of the relic as "vera icon" over time developed into a name for the relic and was mistaken as the name of a person associated with it. Subsequently various legends about Veronica developed in different regions.

Other sources suggest that the name Veronica is a Latin variation of the name Berenice, itself a Latinized form of the ancient Macedonian name Βερενίκη (Berenike), in turn derived from the ancient Greek name Φερενίκη (Pherenike). The description of the relic as "vera icon" likely influenced the spelling from an early date.

== History of the veil ==
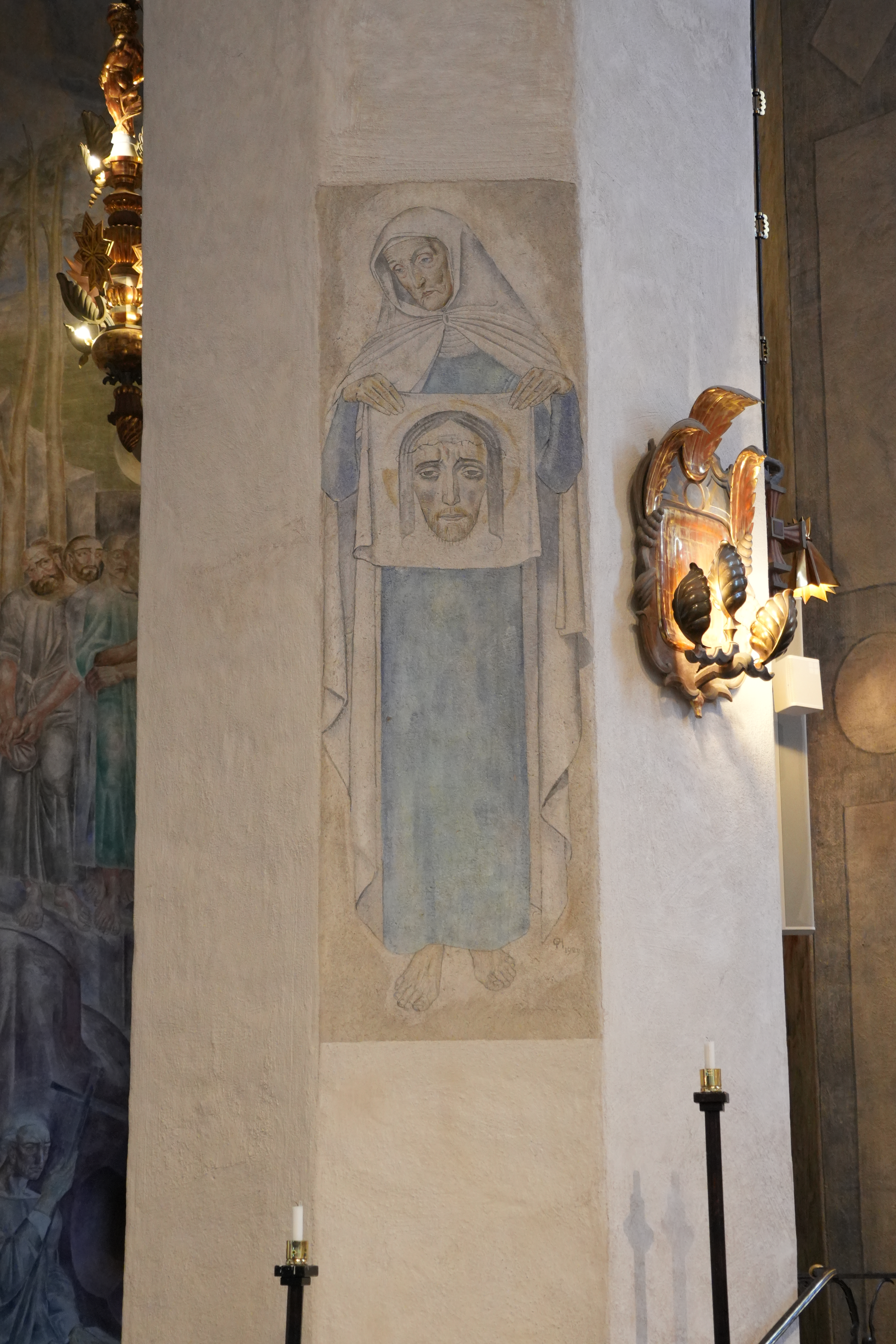
Veil of Veronica (1923) by Olle Hjortzberg in Högalid Evangelical-Lutheran Church in Stockholm

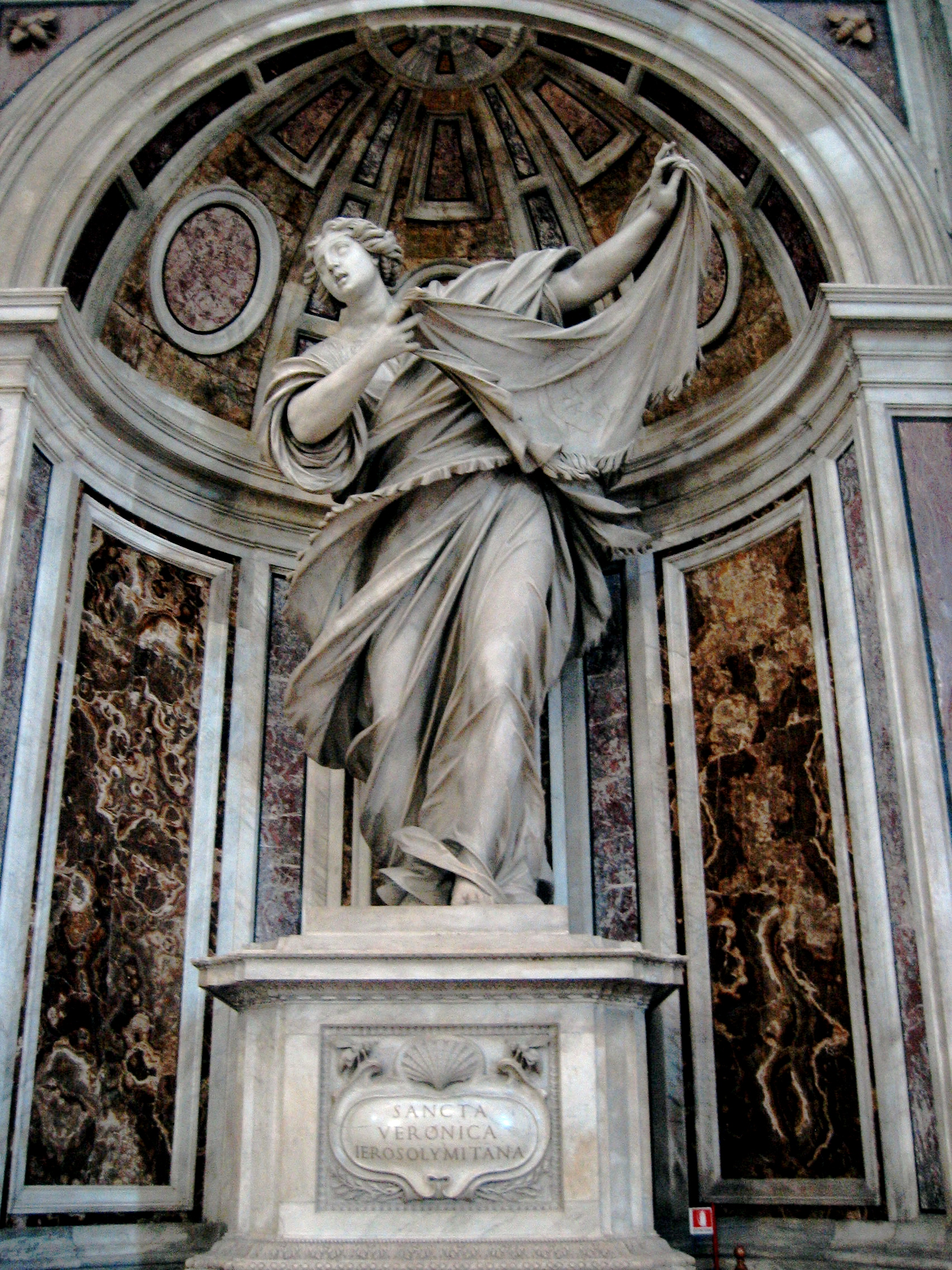
Statue of St Veronica & the Veil at St Peter's Basilica

That there was a physical image venerated as the Veil of Veronica and displayed in Rome from the 14th century on is clear, but the provenance of this image is uncertain.

It has often been assumed that the Veil of Veronica was present in the Old St Peter's in the papacy of Pope John VII (705–708), since a chapel known as the Veronica chapel was built during his reign. In 1011 a scribe was identified as the keeper of the cloth, indicating that the Veil was there.

Firm records of the Veil begin only in 1199, when two pilgrims, Gerald de Barri (Giraldus Cambrensis) and Gervase of Tilbury, made two accounts at different times of a visit to Rome, making direct reference to the existence of the Veil of Veronica. Shortly after that, in 1207, the cloth became more prominent when it was publicly paraded and displayed by Pope Innocent III, who also granted indulgences to anyone praying before it. This procession, between St Peter's and the Santo Spirito Hospital, became an annual event and on one such occasion in 1300 Pope Boniface VIII, who had it translated to St. Peter's in 1297, was inspired to proclaim the first Jubilee in 1300. During this Jubilee the Veronica was publicly displayed and became one of the "Mirabilia Urbis" ("Wonders of the City") for the pilgrims who visited Rome. For the next two hundred years, the Veil, retained at Old St Peter's, was regarded as the most precious of all Christian relics; there Pedro Tafur, a Spanish visitor in 1436, noted:

On the right hand is a pillar as high as a small tower, and in it is the holy Veronica. When it is to be exhibited an opening is made in the roof of the church and a wooden chest or cradle is let down, in which are two clerics, and when they have descended, the chest or cradle is drawn up, and they, with the greatest reverence, take out the Veronica and show it to the people, who make concourse there upon the appointed day. It happens often that the worshippers are in danger of their lives, so many are they and so great is the press._{Pedro Tafur, Andanças e viajes.}

After the Sack of Rome in 1527, some writers recorded that the Veil had been destroyed: Messer Unbano tells the Duchess of Urbino that the Veronica was stolen and passed around the taverns of Rome. Other writers however, testify to its continuing presence in the Vatican and one witness to the sacking states that the Veronica was not found by the looters.

Many artists of the time created reproductions of the Veronica, again suggesting its survival, but in 1616, Pope Paul V prohibited the manufacture of further copies unless made by a canon of Saint Peter's Basilica. In 1629, Pope Urban VIII not only prohibited reproductions of the Veronica from being made, but also ordered the destruction of all existing copies. His edict declared that anyone who had access to a copy must bring it to the Vatican, under penalty of excommunication.

In the 17th century the veil was found hidden in a relic chamber built by Bernini into one of the piers supporting the dome of St Peter's. The relic is still kept in St. Peter’s Basilica. One of the piers which support the dome has an alcove holding a large statue of Veronica by Francesco Mochi; above it is a balcony, and behind the balcony lies the chapel holding the cloth. In the Jubilee year of 2025, it was decided to display Veronica's Veil in the Veronica loggia in an extraordinary liturgy on the fifth Sunday of Lent (April 6).

== Images traditionally connected with the Veil of Veronica ==
There are at least six images in existence which bear a marked resemblance to each other, one which is traditionally claimed to be the original Veil, others direct copies of the first and, in two cases, the Mandylion. Each member of this group is enclosed in an elaborate outer frame with a gilded metal sheet (or riza in Russian) within, in which is cut an aperture where the face appears; at the lower extreme of the face there are three points which correspond to the shape of the hair and beard.

Veil of Veronica

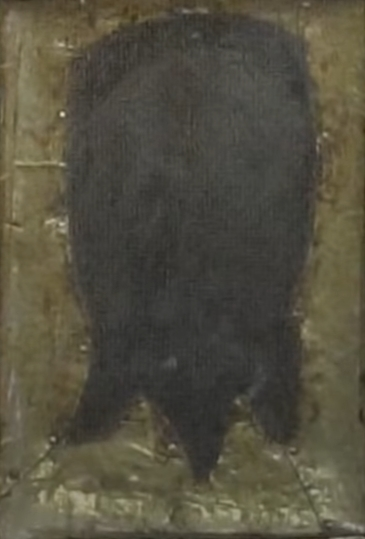
The Vatican Veronica

The Holy Face of Vienna

The Holy Face of Alicante

The Holy Face of Jaén

=== St. Peter's Basilica ===
There is a relic kept in St. Peter's Basilica that is said to be the Veil of Veronica. It is stored in the chapel that lies behind the balcony in the southwest pier supporting the dome.

In the 19th century, Xavier Barbier de Montault privately viewed the veil. His account is presented by Adolphe Napoléon Didron in Volume 23 of Annales Archéologiques. He confers, "Unfortunately, by one of these too frequent customs in Italy, a metal blade covers the interior and leaves only the figure, from which it draws the contours. To these contours, frankly accused, we suspect long hair that falls on the shoulders, and a short beard that turns into two little-supplied wicks. The rest of the features are so vaguely drawn, or rather so completely erased, that I needed the best will in the world to see the trace of the eyes or the nose."

In 1907, Jesuit art historian Joseph Wilpert was allowed to remove two plates of crystal to inspect the image. He describes only a square fabric of penny hue, yellowed with age, with two large, faint rust-brown stains. He then says the object corresponds to the oldest documents, and cites two of them.

Nevertheless, the face is still displayed each year on the occasion of the 5th Sunday of Lent, Passion Sunday, in a tradition that dates back to the seventeenth century. Just before vespers, there is a procession within the basilica, accompanied to the Litany of the Saints. A bell rings and three canons carry the heavy frame out on the balcony above the statue of St. Veronica holding the veil. From this limited view no image is discernible and it is only possible to see the shape of the inner frame.

=== The Hofburg Palace, Vienna ===
In the Hofburg Palace in Vienna there is a copy of the Veronica, identified by the signature of P. Strozzi in the right hand corner of the inner frame. He was the secretary of Pope Paul V, and a man referred to by Vatican notary Jacopo Grimaldi as making a series of six meticulous copies of the veil in 1617.

The outside of the frame is relatively modern, while the inner frame is roughly made and corresponds to the cut-out pattern of earlier copies. The face within is very unclear, more a series of blotches in which only the bare elements of a nose, eyes and mouth can be identified.

It is kept in the Schatzkammer of Sacred and Secular Treasurers of the Habsburg dynasty in the Hofburg Palace, Vienna.

=== Monastery of the Holy Face, Alicante, Spain ===
The Holy Face of Alicante was acquired by Pope Nicholas V from relatives of the Byzantine Emperor in 1453. This veil was given by a Vatican cardinal to a Spanish priest, Mosen Pedro Mena, who took it to Alicante, in southern Spain, where it arrived in 1489, at the same time as a severe drought. Carried in a procession on 17 March by an Alicante priest, Father Villafranca, a tear sprang from the eye of the face of Christ on the veil and rain began to fall. The relic is now housed in the Monastery of the Holy Face (Monasterio de la Santa Faz), on the outskirts of Alicante, in a chapel built in 1611 and decorated between 1677 and 1680 by the sculptor José Vilanova, the gilder Pere Joan Valero and the painter Juan Conchillos. The chapel is decorated with paintings depicting the miraculous termination of the drought, local personalities associated with the founding of the chapel and religious themes of judgment and salvation.

The monastery was extensively restored between 2003 and 2006, together with the Cathedral of Saint Nicholas and the Basilica of St Mary in the city centre. The three buildings housed an exhibition in 2006 about the relic, titled 'The Face of Eternity'.

=== Jaén Cathedral, Jaén, Spain ===
The cathedral of Jaén has a copy of the Veronica which probably dates from the 14th century, and originated in Siena. It is kept in a shrine by the high altar and is annually exhibited to the people on Good Friday and on the Feast of the Assumption. It is exhibited in a chapel to the side of the Cathedral every Friday from 11.30 a.m. to 1 p.m., when visitors are allowed to kiss the glass that protects the image. Known as the Santo Rostro, it was acquired by Bishop Nicholas de Biedma in the 14th century.

== Similar images ==
=== Holy Face of Genoa ===
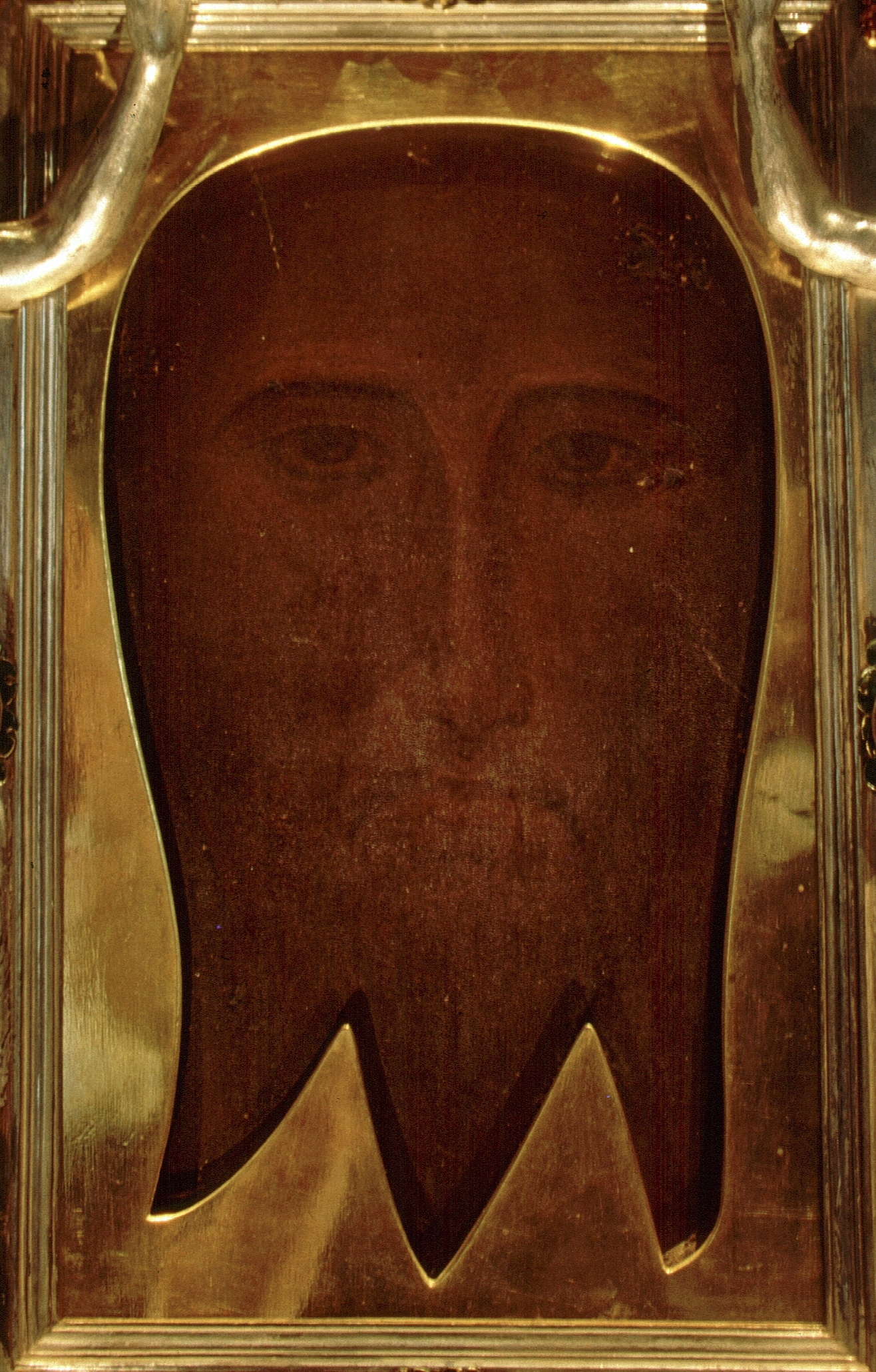
The Holy Face of San Silvestro, now in the Matilda chapel in the Vatican.

Kept in the modest Church of St Bartholomew of The Armenians, Genoa, the Holy Face of Genoa was given in the 14th century to the Doge Leonardo Montaldo by the Byzantine Emperor John V Palaeologus.

The image was studied in detail in 1969 by Colette Dufour Bozzo, who dated the outer frame to the late 14th century, while the inner frame and the image itself are believed to have originated earlier. Bozzo found that the image was imprinted on a cloth that had been pasted onto a wooden board. The similarity of the image with the Veil of Veronica suggests a link between the two traditions.

=== Holy Face of San Silvestro ===
The Holy Face of San Silvestro was kept in Rome's church of San Silvestro until 1870, and is now kept in the Matilda chapel in the Vatican. It is housed in a Baroque frame donated by one Sister Dionora Chiarucci in 1623. The earliest evidence of its existence is 1517, when the nuns were forbidden to exhibit it to avoid competition with the Veronica. Like the Genoa image, it is painted on board, and therefore is likely to be a copy.

It was exhibited at Germany's Expo 2000 in the pavilion of the Holy See.

=== The Manoppello Image ===
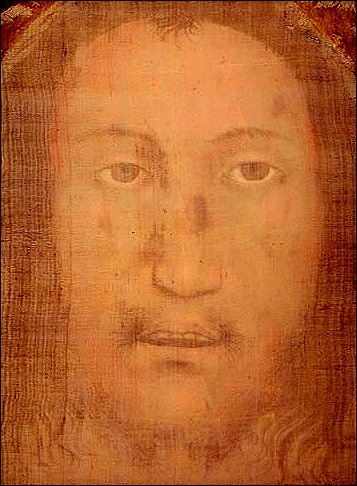
The Manoppello Image.

In 1999, German Jesuit Father Heinnrich Pfeiffer, Professor of Art History at the Pontifical Gregorian University, announced at a press conference in Rome that he had found the Veil in a church of a Capuchin monastery, in the small village of Manoppello, Italy, where it had been since 1660. Professor Pfeiffer had, in fact, been promoting this image for many years before. It is known as the Manoppello Image.

According to local tradition, an anonymous pilgrim arrived in 1508 with the cloth inside a wrapped package. The pilgrim gave it to Dr. Giacomo Antonio Leonelli, who was sitting on a bench in front of the church. The doctor went into the church and opened the parcel containing the Veil. At once, he went out of the church, but could not find the pilgrim who had donated it.

The Veil was owned by the Leonelli family until 1608. Pancrazio Petrucci, a soldier married to Marzia Leonelli, stole the Veil from his father-in-law's house. A few years later, Marzia sold it for 400 scudi to Doctor Donato Antonio De Fabritiis to pay a ransom demand for her husband, who was then a prisoner in Chieti. The Veil was given by De Fabritiis to the Capuchins, who still hold it today. This history was documented by Father Donato da Bomba in his Relatione historica following research started in 1640.

== House of Veronica in Jerusalem ==
The Chapel of The Holy Face on the Via Dolorosa, Jerusalem.

On the Via Dolorosa in Jerusalem there is a small chapel, known as the Chapel of the Holy Face. Traditionally, this is regarded as the home of Saint Veronica and site of the miracle.

== Representative art ==
There are two main traditions for the iconography of the face depicted on the veil. One tradition (Type I), common in Italian art, shows the face of Christ as full-bearded, in pain, scourged and perhaps crowned with thorns. Another (Type II), common in Russian and Spanish art, shows Christ's face more often in repose, hair extending to shoulder length and a bifurcated beard, often surrounded by a halo quartered in a cross.

=== Type I ===
- Veronica's Veil Domenico Fetti, c. 1620.
- Holy Face Giambono, 15th century. Civic Museum, Pavia, Italy.
- Holy Face Held by Two Angels Juan Sánchez Cotan, 1620–1625. Monastery of Cartuja, Granada.
- Holy Face Domenikos Theotokopoulos (El Greco). Convent of Capuchin Nuns, Toledo.
- Veronica's Veil Francisco de Zurbarán, 17th century. Parish Church of St Peter, Seville.

=== Type II ===
- Head of Christ on the Sudarium Claude Mellan, 1649.
- Diptych of Saint Veronica with Christ and the Virgin Mary Bernardo Martorelli, 15th century. Museum of Mallorca.
- Holy Face, anonymous, early 17th century. Tretyakov Gallery, Moscow.
- Holy Face Simon Ushakov, 1678. Tretyakov Gallery, Moscow.
- Miracle of the Tear Juan Conchillos, 1680. Lady Chapel of the Monastery of the Holy Face, Alicante.
- Miracle of the Three faces Juan de Miranda, 1767. Alicante Ayuntamiento.
- Saint Veronica Antonio Castillo Lastrucci, 1946. Basilica of St Mary, Alicante.
Veil of Veronica in art

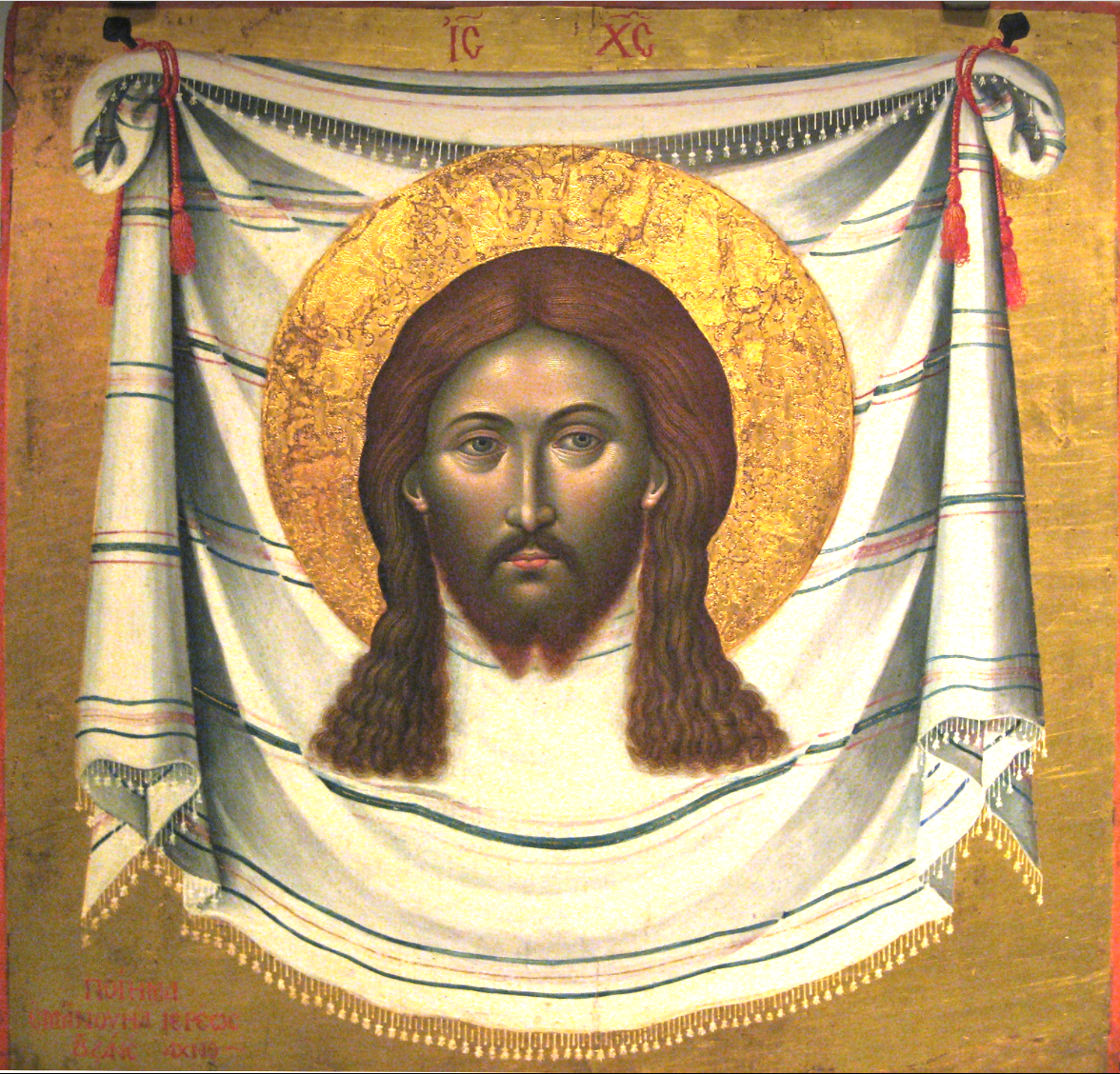
The Holy Towel by Emmanuel Tzanes 1659

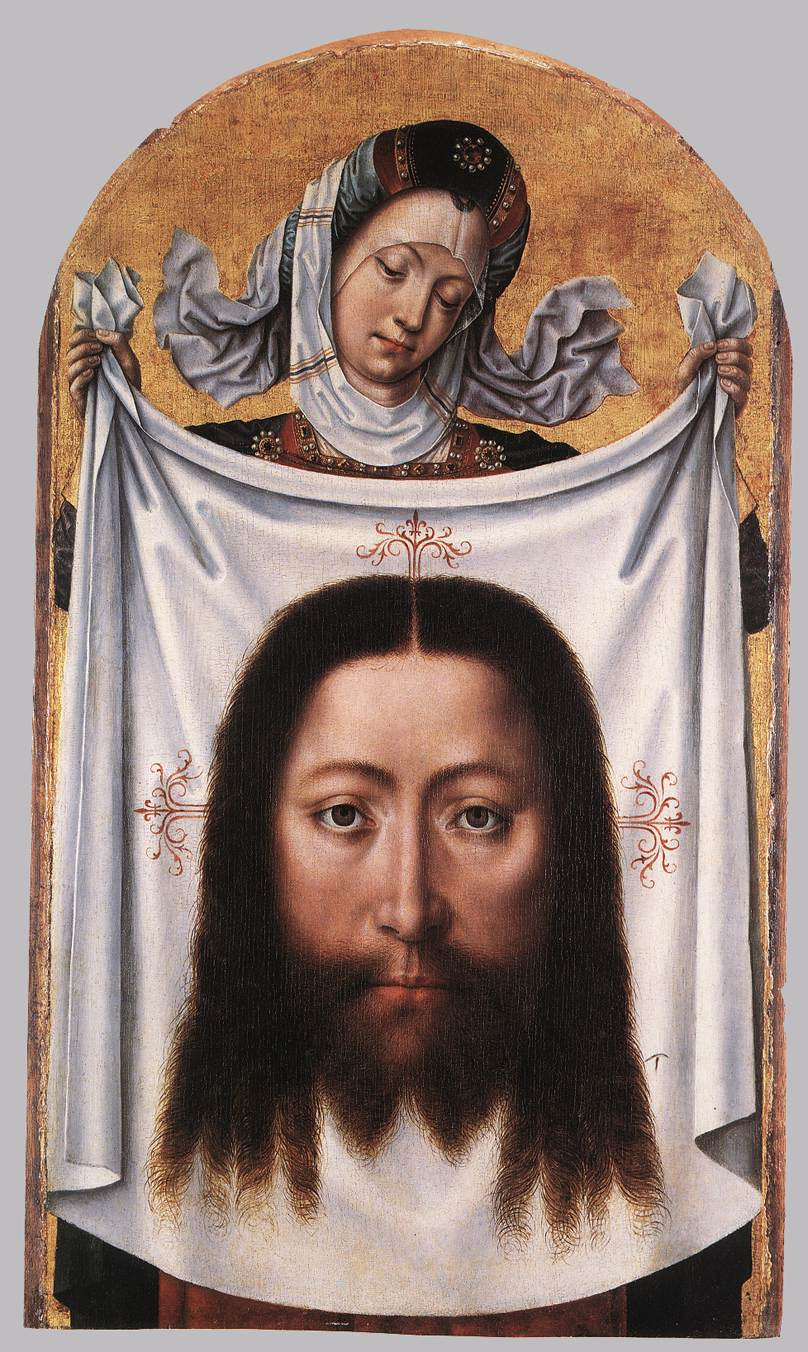
St Veronica with the Sudarium

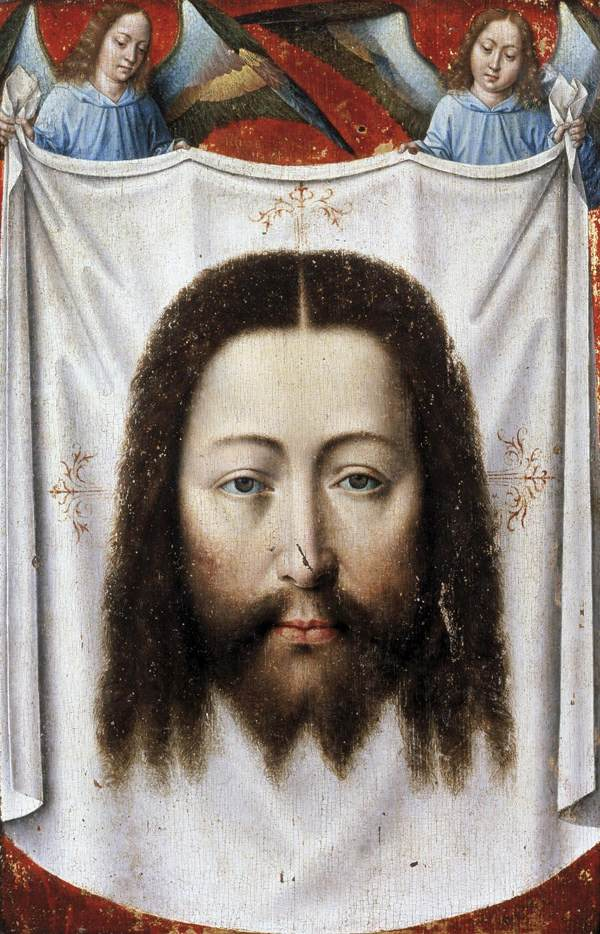
The Veil of Veronica by the Master of the Legend of St. Ursula

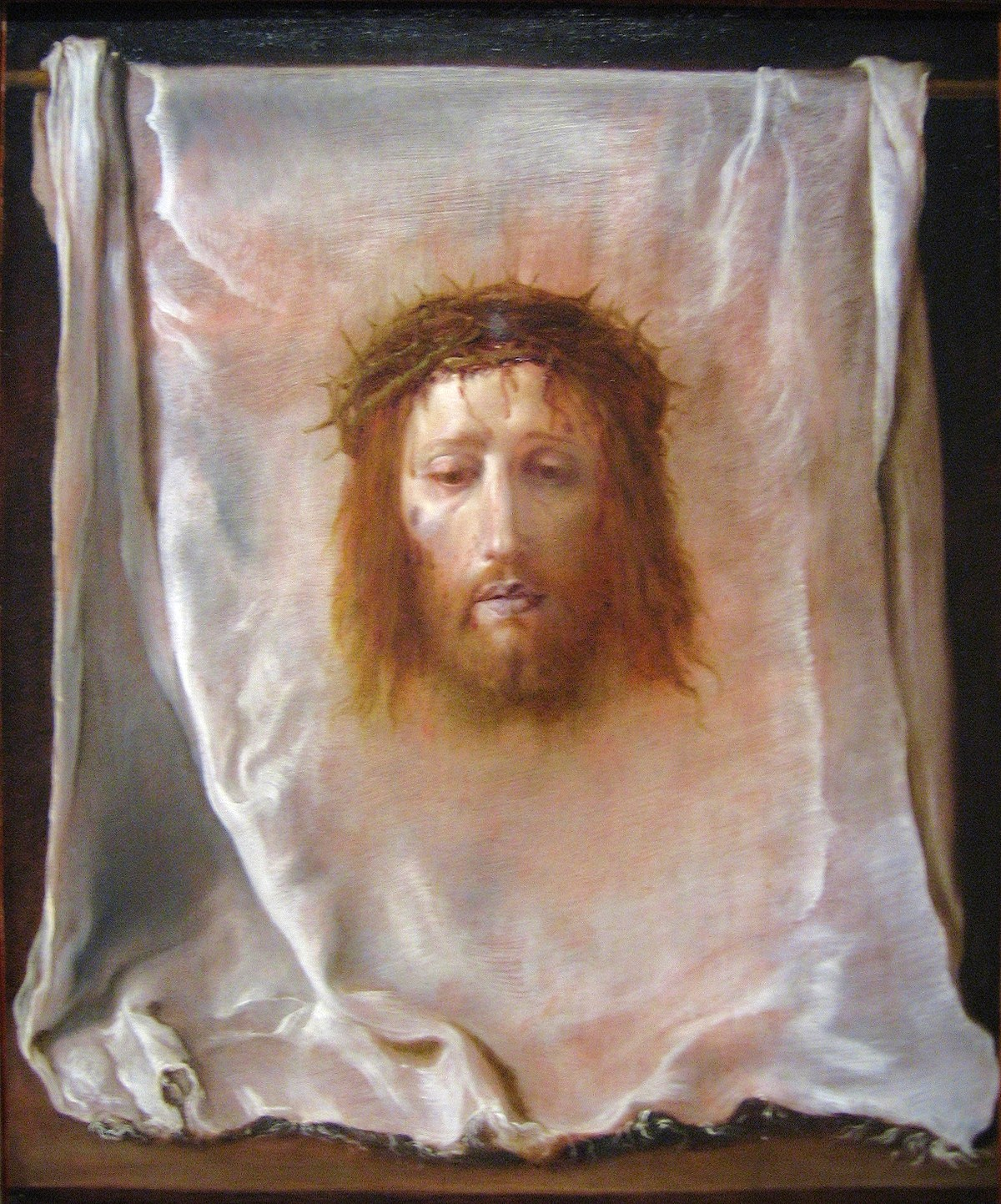
Domenico Fetti, The Veil of Veronica

St. Veronica with the Holy Kerchief

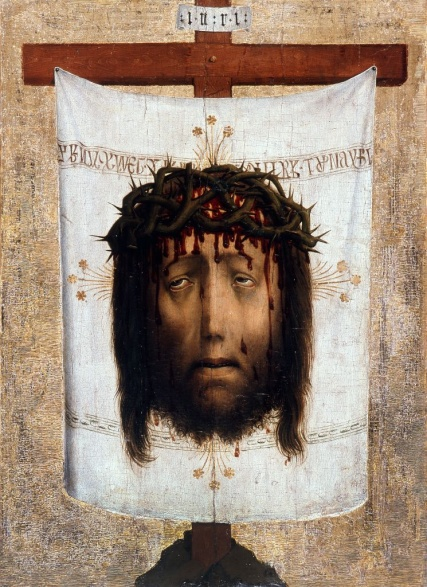
The veil of St. Veronica (Vera Icon), c. 1450

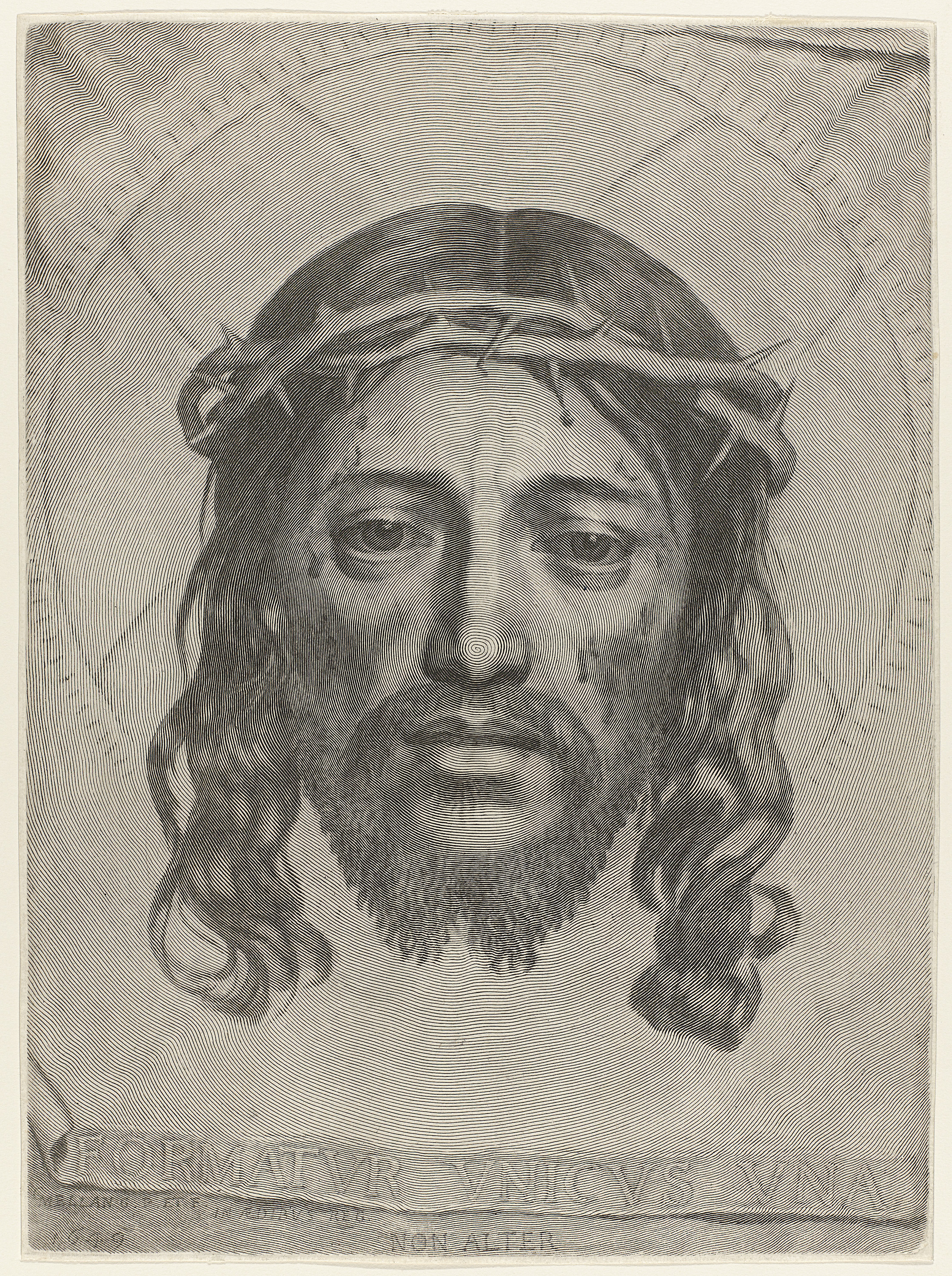
Head of Christ on the Sudarium, engraving by Claude Mellan (1649), a famous virtuoso piece consisting of a single line beginning on the tip of Christ's nose.

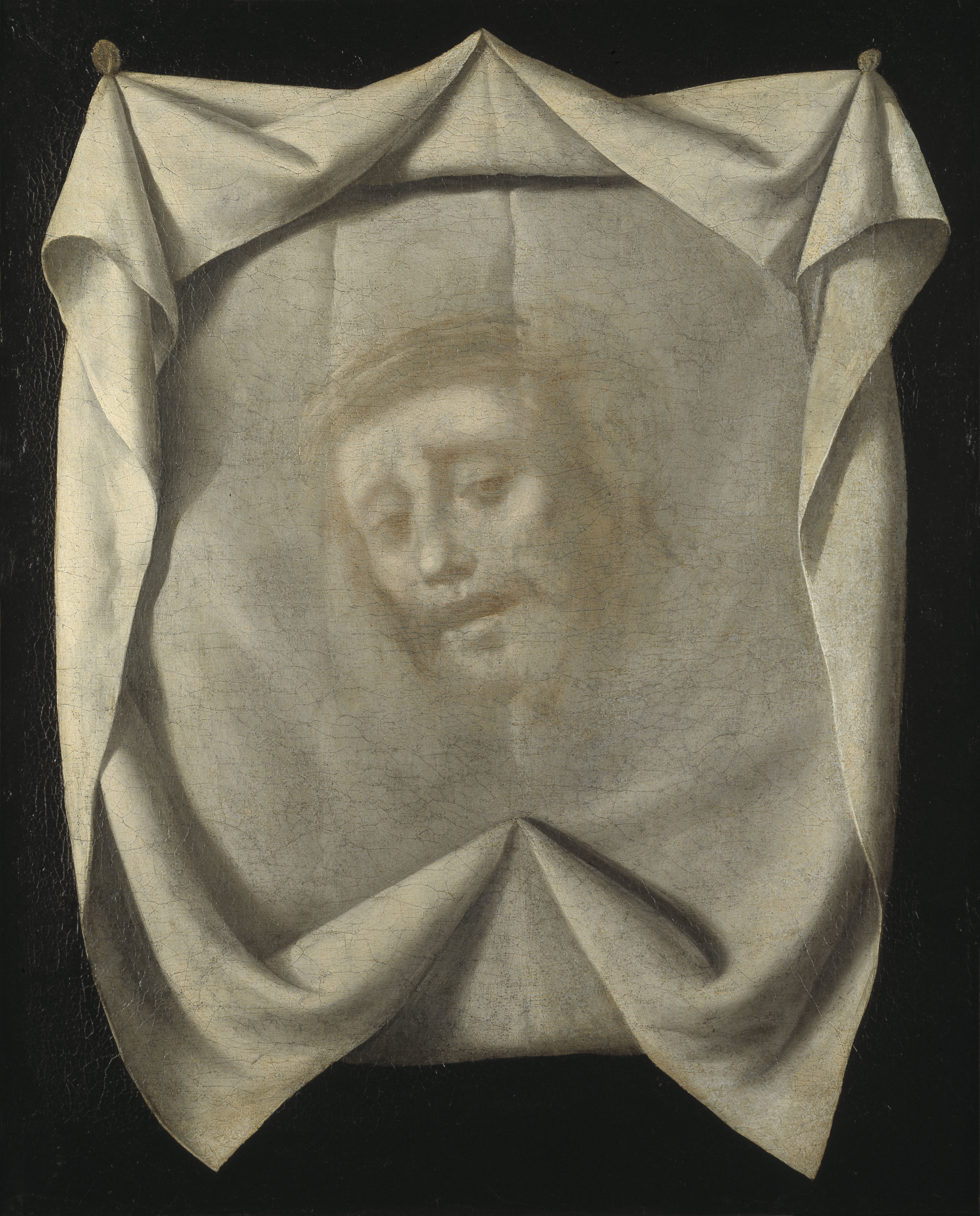
The Veil of Veronica by Francisco de Zurbarán

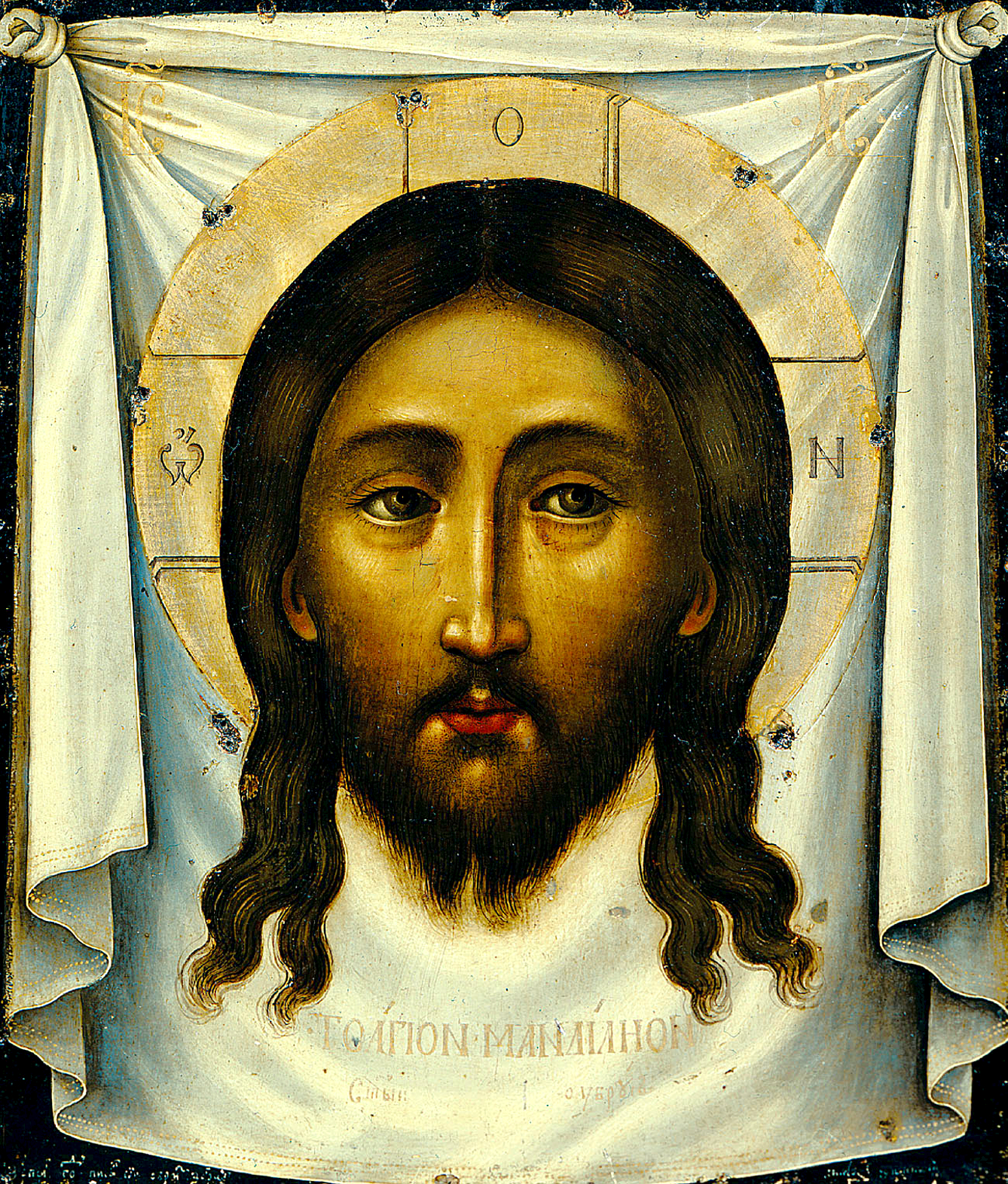
Image of the Saviour, a traditional Orthodox iconography in the interpretation of Simon Ushakov (1658).

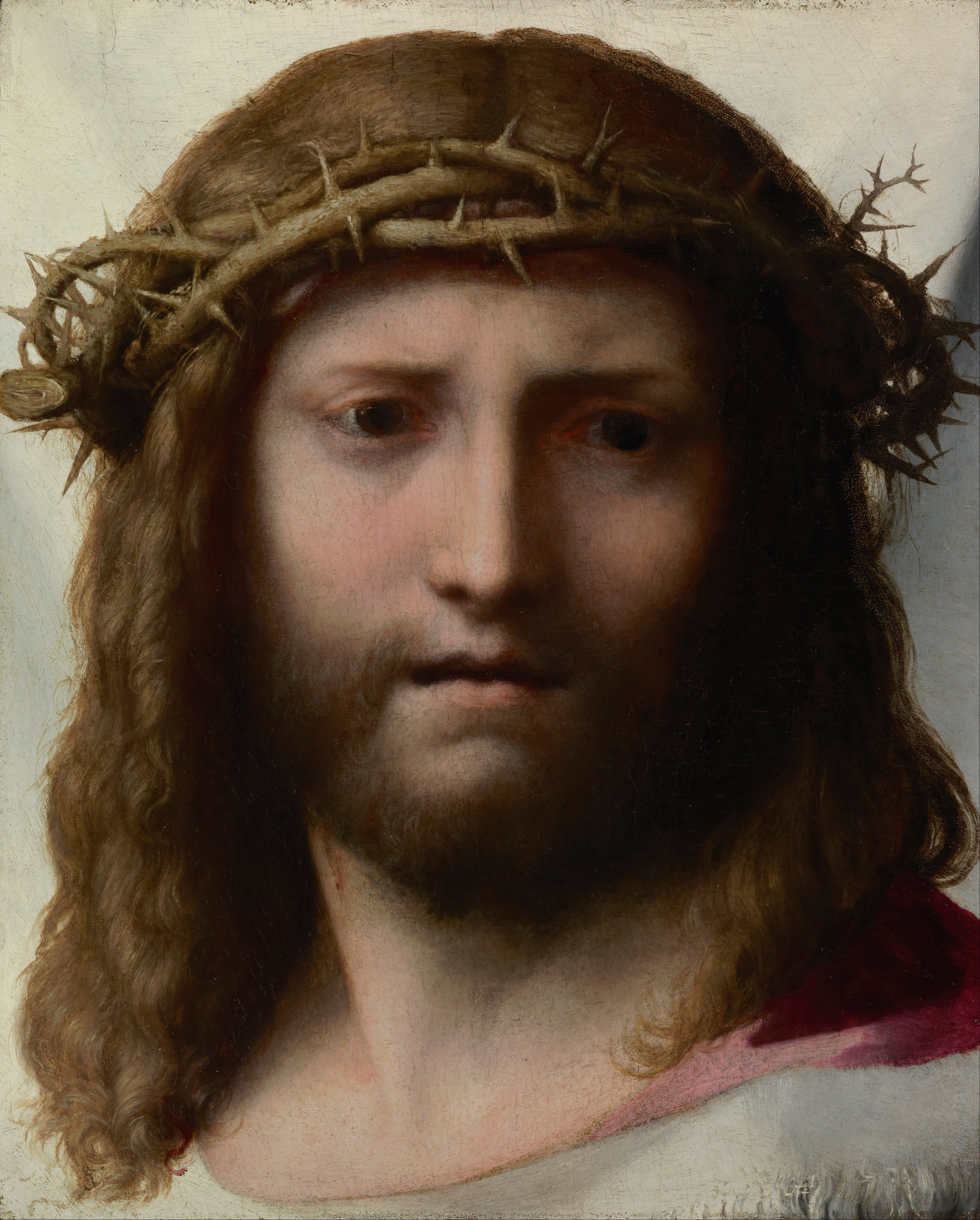
Correggio, 1521

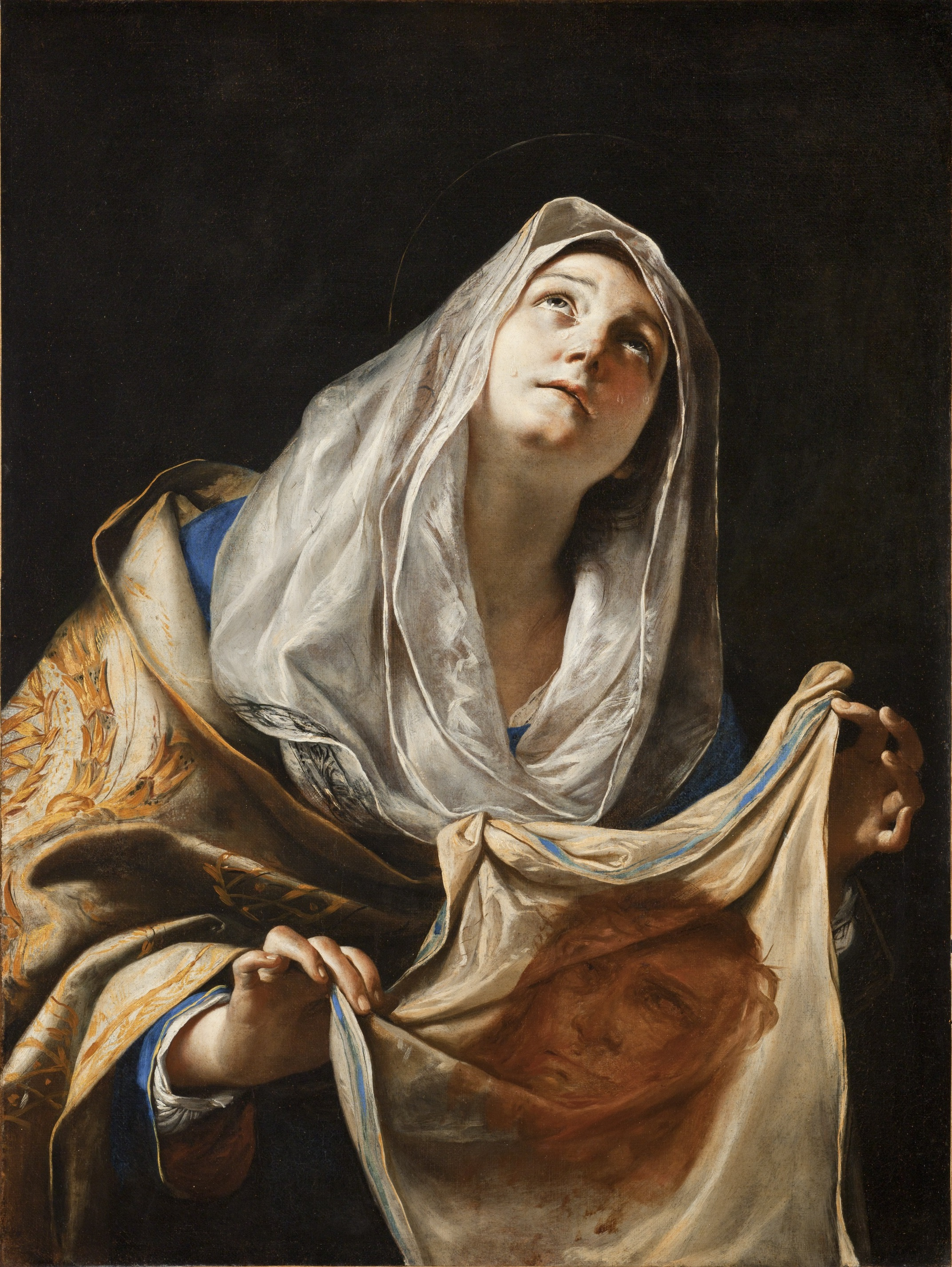
St. Veronica with the Holy Kerchief, by Mattia Preti

=== Modern representations ===
In 2004, Mel Gibson commissioned the creation of a copy of the Veil of Veronica for use in his film The Passion of the Christ. The veil used in the film was sold at auction to an anonymous bidder on 18 July 2025.

== See also ==
- Acheiropoieta
- Black Madonna of Częstochowa
- Image of Camuliana
- Image of Edessa
- Relics associated with Jesus
- Shroud of Turin
- Sudarium of Oviedo
