= Manoppello Image =

Italian relic associated with Jesus

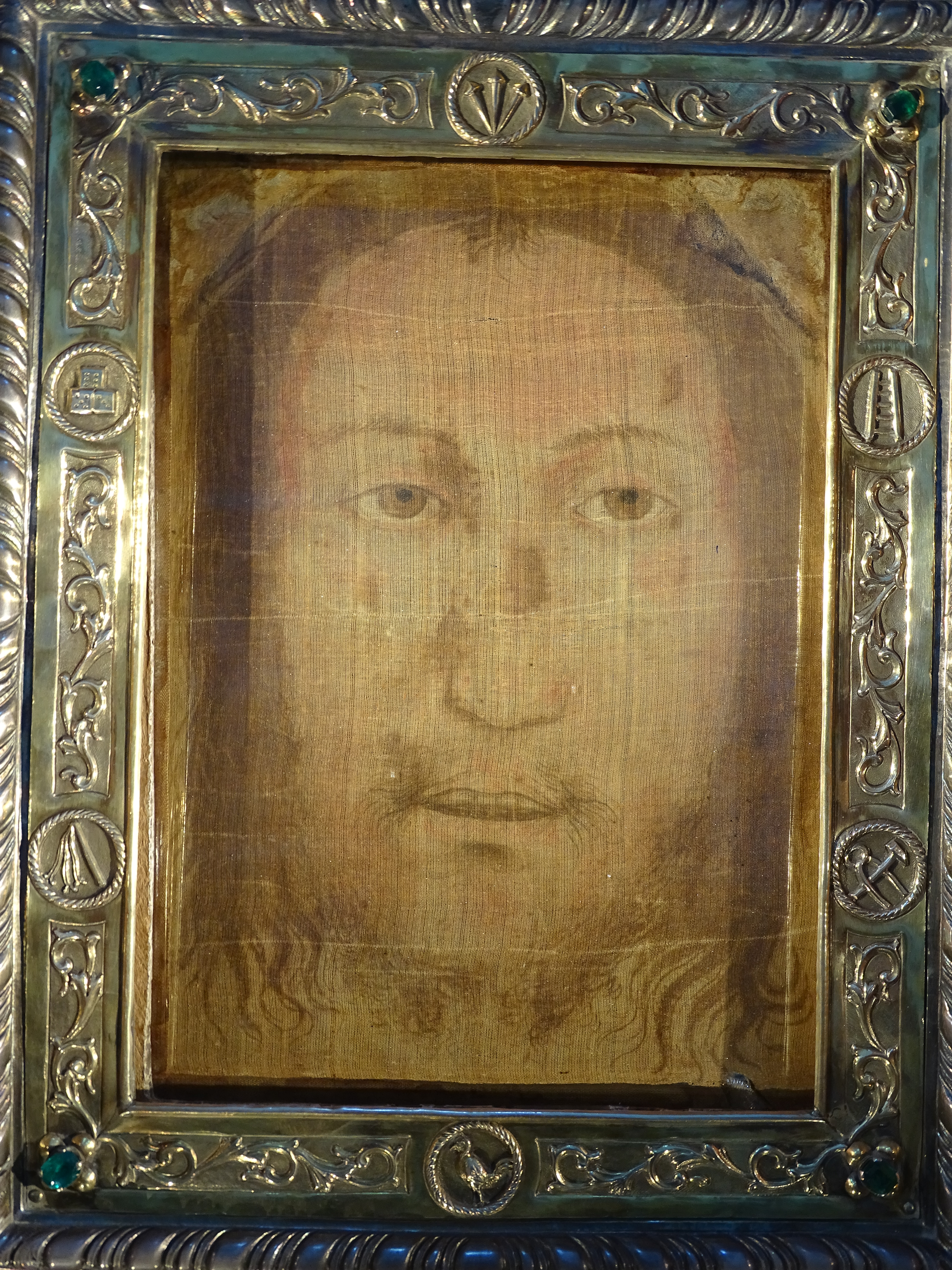
Manoppello Image

The Manoppello Image is a piece of linen cloth allegedly depicting the face of Jesus (17.5 cm wide and 24 cm high) that is stored in a church in the village of Manoppello, Italy. The church, known as Santuario del Volto Santo, is part of a monastery belonging to Capuchin friars. There have been claims that the cloth is the Veil of Veronica.

== Background ==
According to local tradition, an anonymous pilgrim arrived in Manoppello in 1508 with the cloth wrapped in a package. The pilgrim gave the package to Dr. Giacomo Antonio Leonelli, who was sitting on a bench in front of the church. The doctor went into the church and unwrapped the package, discovering the veil. Leonelli immediately left the church to find the pilgrim but could not trace him. The veil was owned by the Leonelli family for a century until 1608, when Pancrazio Petrucci, a soldier married to Marzia (a member of the Leonelli family), stole the veil from his father-in-law's house. A few years later, Marzia sold it for 400 scudi to Doctor Donato Antonio De Fabritiis to pay a ransom demand for her husband, who was a prisoner in Chieti. The veil was given by De Fabritiis to the Capuchins who currently hold it today. This history has been documented by Father Donato da Bomba in his Relatione historica and is based on research that had been started in 1640.

In 1999, German Jesuit Heinnrich Pfeiffer, Professor of Art History at the Pontifical Gregorian University, announced at a press conference in Rome his discovery of the veil in the church of the Capuchin monastery, where it had been since 1660. Pfeiffer had in fact been promoting the image for many years before.

Pfeiffer claims that the image is the Veil of Veronica. He suggests that it was stolen from the Vatican during rebuilding that took place in 1506, before the Sacking of Rome. He further suggests the cloth was placed over Jesus' face in the tomb and that the image was a byproduct of the forces unleashed during Jesus' resurrection – forces, he believes, that also formed the image on the Shroud of Turin. Additionally, he has proposed a history of the veil going back to the first century. His narrative, however, is unsupported by evidence. There is no substantiated evidence connecting the cloth with Rome or the crucifixion. Nevertheless, the cloth has received much publicity in recent years and Pope Benedict XVI visited it on 1 September 2006.

== Origins ==
=== Material ===
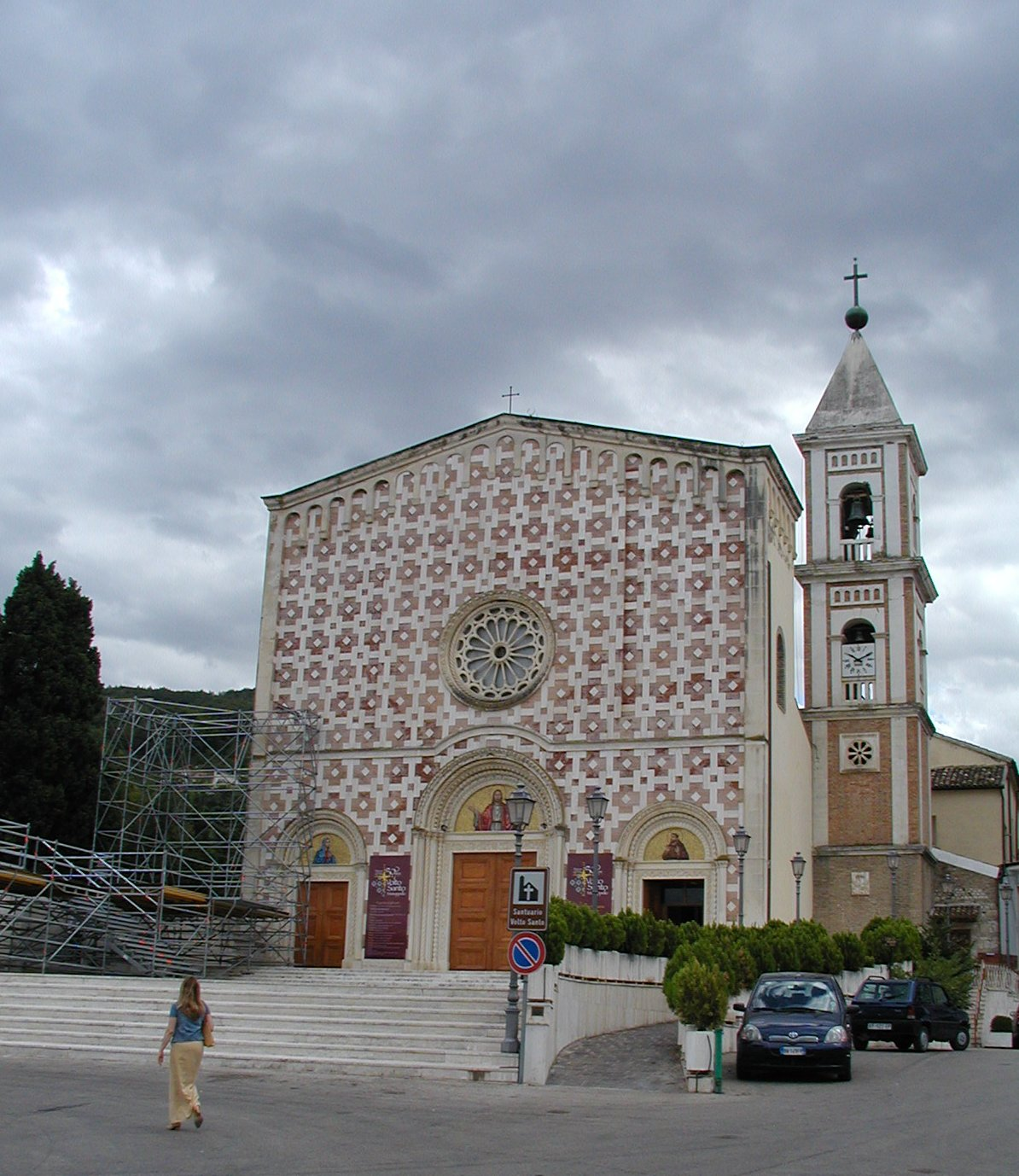
Church of the Volto Santo di Manoppello, housing the Holy Face image.

No samples for laboratory tests to determine the veil’s material have been allowed, and a recent paper concludes that linen must be regarded as the most probable material. The cloth has been claimed to be made of byssus, which is a rare natural fiber from the bivalve mollusc Pinna nobilis, woven into sea silk and used by ancient people mainly around the Mediterranean. Paul Badde, the Vatican correspondent for Die Welt, claims this is a kind of fabric which would usually only be found in the graves of Egyptian pharaohs, but byssus fabric (sea silk) has never been exclusive to ancient Egyptians and was considered a high-quality fabric made in antiquity by the Phoenicians, Greeks, and Romans, during the Middle Ages by the French and Italians, and even today by Sardinians.

=== Artificially-made image ===
Most researchers state that, despite fringe claims of divine origins, the face on the veil at Manoppello clearly conforms in appearance to the characteristics of an artificially-made image and that stylistically it is similar to images dating to the Late Middle Ages or early Renaissance. A bleaching processes of pheomelanin in byssal threads has been proposed as an alternative to pigment by professor Jan Jaworski.

During the International Workshop on the Scientific approach to the Acheiropoietos images, held at the ENEA Research Centre of Frascati in 2010, proponents said the image (and other related copies) is typical of representations of the human form from a given period, and is imperfectly executed, with numerous stylised features, showing that the artist either did not understand, or did not wish to comply with the basic principles of proportion that apply to realistic renderings of the human form apart from some features, such as the crooked nose, which might show the beaten, bruised and human Christ that people would expect to see in an actual divine image.

A further objection, advanced by Ian Wilson, is that because the image does not bear a familial resemblance to known copies (see above), it cannot be the version of the Veronica that was venerated in the Middle Ages. Paul Badde, journalist for the German newspaper Die Welt, in his 2010 book The Face of God, differs with Wilson's statements, comparing images he claims were made before 1608 of an open-eyed and open-mouthed man just like the Manoppello image.

=== Other investigations ===
A 2018 study by De Caro et al., described the image as appearing on thin linen had altered over time by mechanical movement of the linen fibres, and that the linen fibres themselves are probably cemented by starch. The same group also concluded that possible retouching painting had occurred to the linen.

After further studies, the same group concluded in 2019 that the image may be historically related to the shroud of Turin and can be superimposed upon it.

In 2020 they also theorised that the Veil of Manoppello and the Veronica’s Veil could be the same object and also came to the following conclusions:

- The original colour of the eyes appearing on the Holy Face could have been blue
- If the eyes were blue, centuries of time led to yellowing of them
- After about 10 centuries an artist is likely to have retouched greenish color, with brown which may have appeared to be more acceptable

De Caro et al. theorised that the veil of Manopello could be from the Roman period if the same object as was displayed by the Vatican in 1200 and retouched before public display then. X-ray dating could allow accurate dating of the linen. However, the wide-angle X-ray scattering (WAXS) is not accurate because nobody has any idea in what kind environment the veil was stored in during various periods (only the last few are known), where temperature, humidity, and light exposure, among other environmental factors, affect the rate/degree of structural degradation of the fibers, which in the end are judged by the subjective opinion of the researcher looking at the picture.

== Urban legends ==
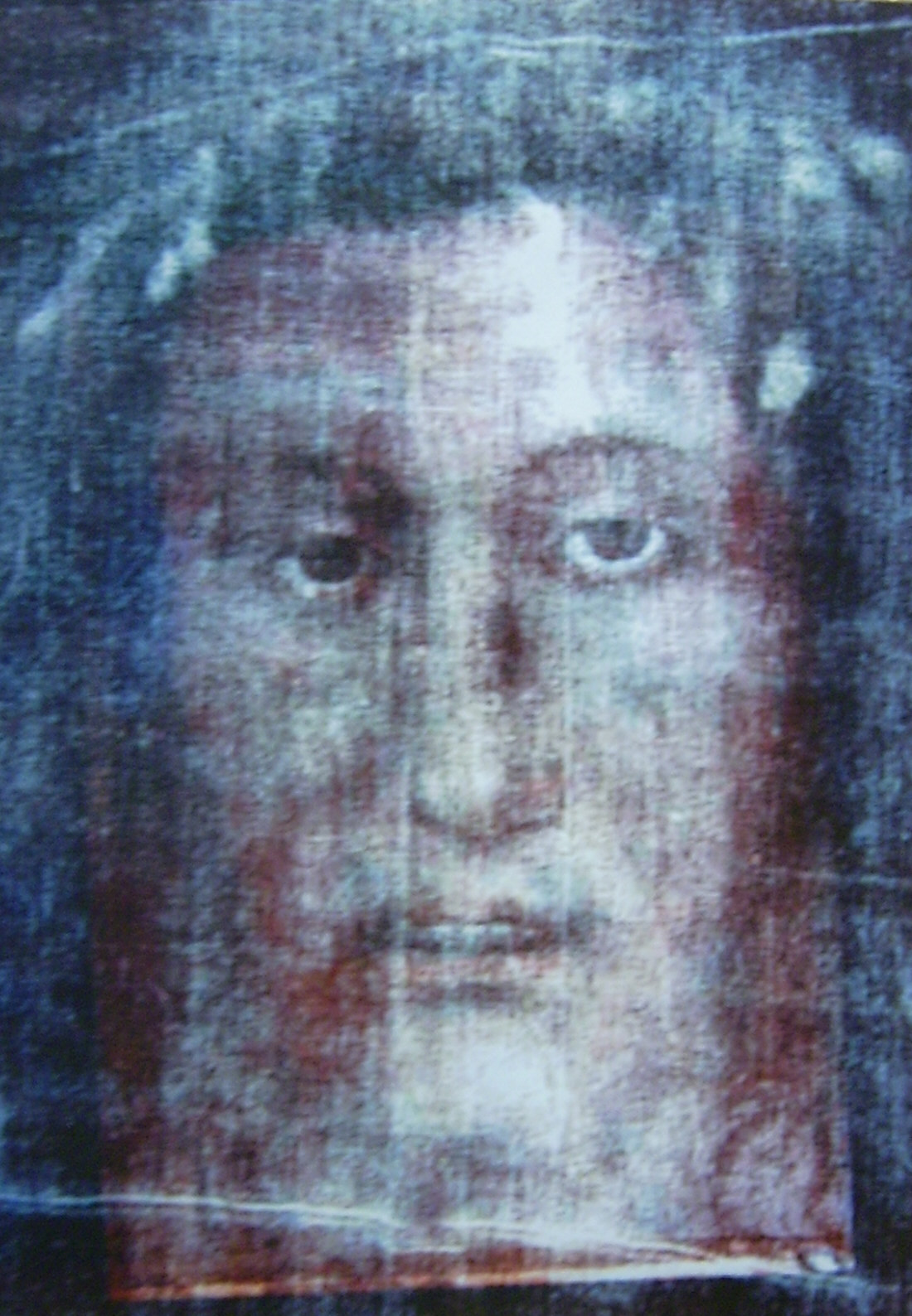
Superposition of the Veil of Manoppello on an inaccurate artistic depiction of the negative of the Shroud of Turin, made in 2005.

Fanti and Jaworski claim in a pseudoscientific paper that the face on the Manoppello Image has numerous "interesting analogies" (page 1) with the face presented on the Shroud of Turin although "their shapes and sizes are not identical" (page 5). They claim that 3D properties of the Manoppello Image (similar to that of the Shroud, but weaker) have been discovered. They also conclude that the characteristics "speak in favor of the Acheropita image" (on page 1). In other words, the theory of the image being not made by human means, which is in contradiction with the studies by R. Falcinelli who is an expert in photography and claims instead that the Manoppello image is rather a manmade painted artifact that would be reminiscent of existing iconography.

Gian Marco Rinaldi from the Italian Committee for the Investigation of Claims of the Paranormal (CICAP) goes as far as to say that the theory according to which there would not be any trace of pigment on the Manoppello Image is nothing but an "urban legend", which takes its roots from internet sites and blogs as well as from the public statements of religious authorities in Italy and many articles from Paul Badde in Die Welt, all of whom have extrapolated dubiously the works of Donato Vittore and Giulio Fanti.

Fanti, although being pro-authenticity, has never claimed that there weren't any traces of pictorial pigments; he only stated in his papers that the manner in which the image was made is not known to him and that the image has not been made by weaving "colored thread". Fanti and his collaborators claimed that certain parts did contain pigments but, when zooming to a certain extent between the fibers, pigments were not found between them but only on the fabric's surface, due to the intrinsic characteristics of the extremely fine byssus fabric. Rinaldi insists upon the fact that Fanti and his associates never said in any paper whatsoever that the Manoppello Image corresponded "exactly" to the Turin Shroud, and that such an extrapolated statement has only been made public by sister Blandine Schlömer, a Trappist nun from Manopello in charge of communicating with the media. Rinaldi shows that Fanti changed his theory many times, claiming pigments were absent, then only visible in particular zones such as the eyes and finally that, yes, it contains pigments but only the manner they were deposited on the byssus is unknown to him. These never-ending adjustments of the pro-authenticity arguments may have led some to extrapolate to such a degree, according to Rinaldi.

== See also ==
- Acheiropoieta: images "not made by hands"
- Depiction of Jesus
- Relics associated with Jesus
- Shroud of Turin
- Sudarium of Oviedo
- Veil of Veronica
