= Manoppello =

- Comune
- Comune di Manoppello
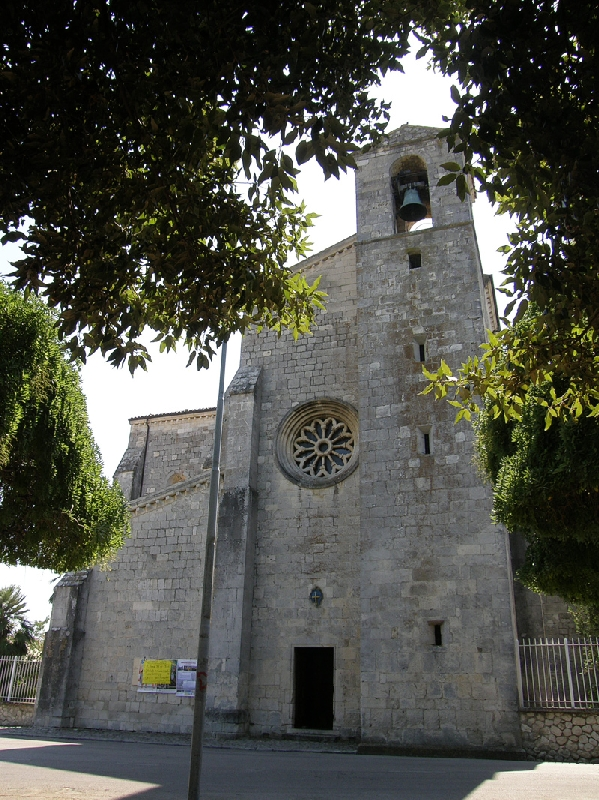
- Church of Santa Maria Arabona

- Coat of arms

- Location within Italy Location within Abruzzo
- Coordinates: 42°15′29″N 14°03′36″E
- Country: Italy
- Region: Abruzzo
- Province: Pescara (PE)
- Frazioni: Manoppello Scalo, Ripacorbaria, Santa Maria Arabona

Government
  - Mayor: Giorgio De Luca

Area
  - Total: 39.26 km^{2} (15.16 sq mi)
- Elevation: 217 m (712 ft)

Population (28 August 2022)
  - Total: 6,772
  - Density: 172.5/km^{2} (446.7/sq mi)
- Demonym: Manoppellesi
- Time zone: UTC+1 (CET)
  - Summer (DST): UTC+2 (CEST)
- Postal code: 65024, 65025, 65020
- Dialing code: 085
- Patron saint: Manoppello Image
- Saint day: Third Monday in May
- Website: Official website

Manoppello (Abruzzese: Manuppèlle) is a comune in Abruzzo, in the province of Pescara, south-eastern Italy.

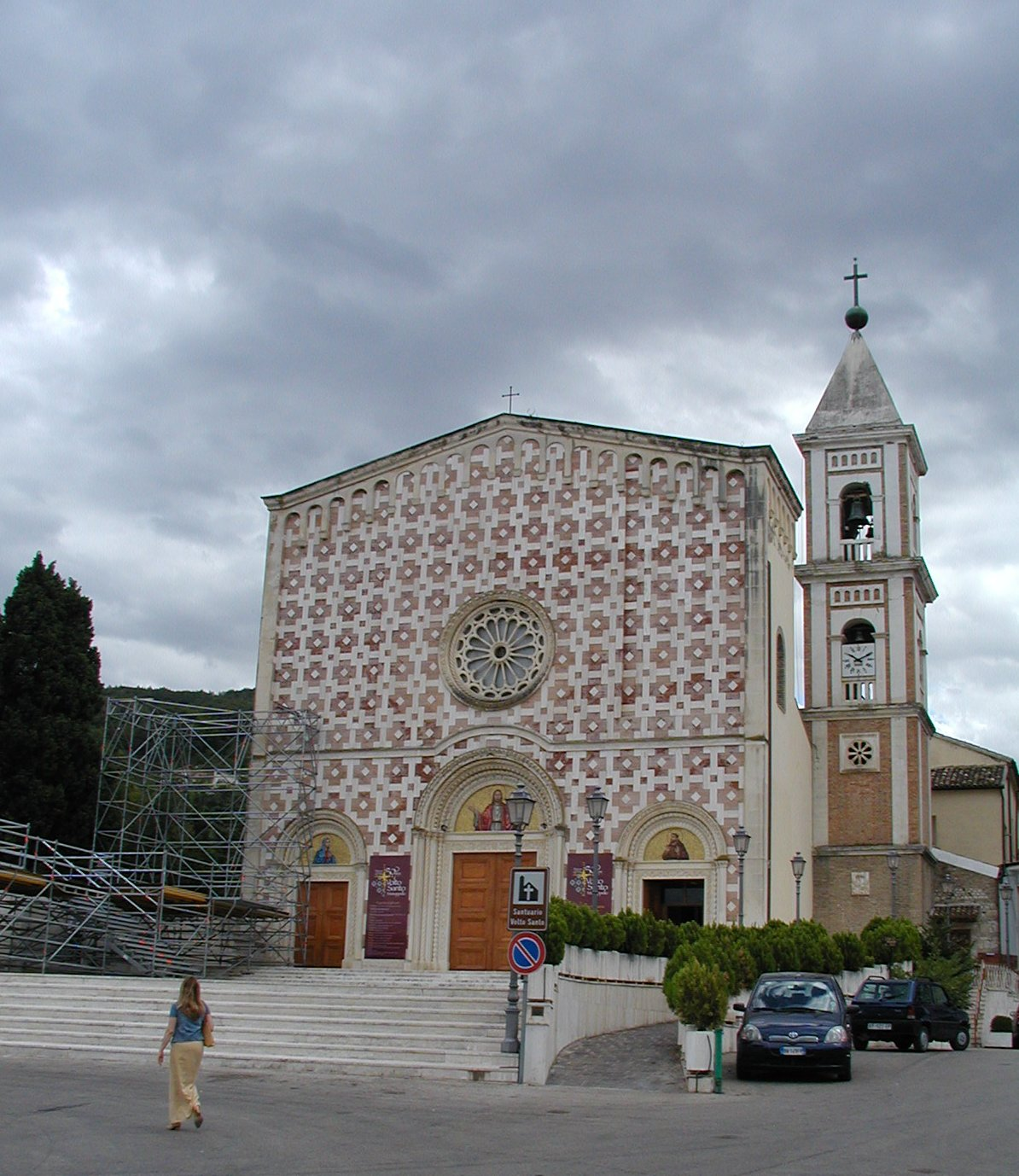
Church of the Volto Santo di Manoppello, housing the Holy Face image.

It is famous for having a church which contains an image on a thin byssus veil, a sudarium, known as the Holy Face of Manoppello and which has been reputed to be identical to the Veil of Veronica.

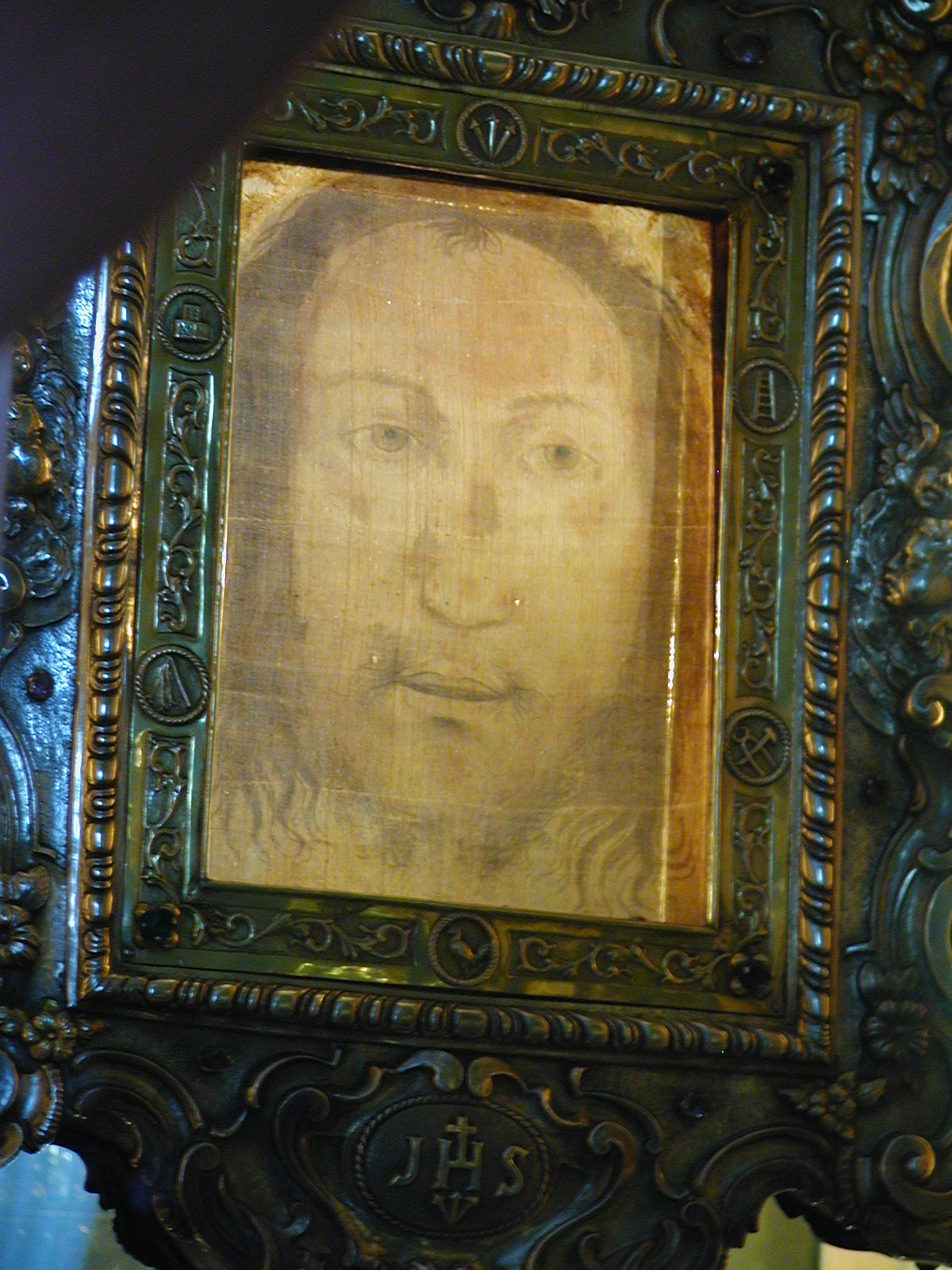
Veil of Veronica.

Other sights include is the Romanesque abbey of Santa Maria Arabona.

== Twin towns ==
- Casarano, Italy
- Charleroi, Belgium
